= C. elegans (disambiguation) =

C. elegans most commonly refers to the model round worm Caenorhabditis elegans. It may also refer to any of the species below. They are listed, first in taxonomic order (including synonyms) and, second, alphabetically.

== Animals ==
=== Porifera (sponges) ===
==== Calcarea (calcareous sponges) ====
- Consobrinomia elegans, a species from the Mediterranean

==== Demospongiae (demosponges) ====
- Clathria elegans, a species of family Microcionidae found in the United States part of the North Atlantic Ocean
- Clathrissa elegans, a synonym for Tedania elegans, a species of family Tedaniidae found in Australia
- Crella elegans (syn. Cribella elegans or Cribrella elegans), a marine species of family Crellidae found in the Adriatic
- Callyspongia elegans (syn. Cladochalina elegans), a species found in Indonesia
- Chalinissa elegans, a synonym for Callyspongia serpentina, a species found in Australia and New Zealand
- Chalinopsilla elegans, a synonym for Dactylia elegans, a species found in Western Australia
- Chalinodendron elegans , a synonym for Haliclona elegans, a species found in southeast Australia
- Carteriospongia elegans, a synonym for Carteriospongia foliascens, a species (Thorectidae)
- Caulospongia elegans, a species of family Suberitidae found in Australia
- Craniella elegans, a marine species of family Tetillidae found in southern India and Sri Lanka
- †Cupulospongia elegans, an extinct species (incertae sedis) from the Cretaceous of France

==== Hexactinellida (glass sponges) ====
- †Cribrospongia elegans, an extinct species of family Cribrospongiidae from the Jurassic of Germany
- Caulophacus elegans, a species (Rossellidae, Lanuginellinae) found in Central Kuroshio Current, near Japan
- Corbitella elegans, a species (Euplectellidae) found in the Banda Sea in the Maluku Islands of Indonesia

=== Cnidaria (cnidarians) ===
==== Hydrozoa (hydrozoans) ====
- Cryptolaria elegans, a synonym for Acryptolaria elegans, a thecate hydroid (Lafoeidae) found in the Gulf of Mexico

==== Anthozoa (corals, sea pens and gorgonians) ====
===== †Rugosa (rugose or horn corals) =====
- †Cardiaphyllum elegans, an extinct species from the Upper Carboniferous of China

===== Scleractinia (stony corals) =====
- †Calamophylliopsis elegans, a species (Dermosmiliidae) from the Cretaceous of China
- †Chorisastrea elegans, an extinct species (Calamophylliidae) found in Switzerland
- †Codonosmilia elegans, an extinct species (Rhipidogyridae) from the Jurassic of Switzerland
- Coeloria elegans, a species (incertae sedis)
- †Colpophyllia elegans, an extinct species (Mussidae)
- †Comophyllia elegans, an extinct species (Latomeandridae) from the Jurassic of France
- †Conosmilia elegans, an extinct species (Flabellidae) from the Tertiary of South Australia
- †Cyathophora elegans, a synonym for Holocystis elegans, a species (Cyathophoridae) from the Cretaceous of Mexico, Spain and the United Kingdom
- Cycloseris elegans, a mushroom coral (Fungiidae) found on the west coast of America

===== Stauriida =====
- †Carinthiaphyllum elegans, an extinct species (Geyerophyllidae) from the Carboniferous of China

===== †Tabulata (tabulate corals) =====
- †Caliapora elegans an extinct species (†Favositidae) from the Devonian of the Urals
- †Catenipora elegans, an extinct species (†Halysitidae) from the Silurian of Estonia
- †Coenites elegans, an extinct species (†Coenitidae) from the Devonian of Altai

===== Alcyonacea (soft corals) =====
- Callogorgia elegans (syn. Callicella elegans), a species (Primnoidae) found in the western North Pacific
- Chrysogorgia elegans, a species (Chrysogorgiidae) found in the Gulf of Mexico, the Mediterranean Sea and the North Atlantic Ocean
- Cyathopodium elegans, a species (Clavulariidae) found in the western part of the Atlantic Ocean

===== Pennatulacea (sea pens) =====
- Cavernularia elegans, a species (Veretillidae) from the North Atlantic Ocean

==== Myxozoa (myxozoans) ====
- Ceratomyxa elegans, a species (Ceratomyxidae) found in the Mediterranean and the Argentinian seas where it is a parasite of toadfishes

=== Echinodermata (echinoderms) ===
==== Asteroidea (sea stars) ====
- Calliaster elegans, a species
- †Comptonia elegans, an extinct species from the Cretaceous of France
- †Chariaster elegans, an extinct species from the Cretaceous of Egypt

==== Crinoidea (crinoids) ====
- †Calceolispongia elegans, an extinct species (Calceolispongiidae) that lived along the shores of what corresponds to Timor and Western Australia today
- †Cicerocrinus elegans, an extinct species (Pisocrinidae) known from the Silurian of the United Kingdom
- Clarkometra elegans, a feather star (Colobometridae) found from southwest Mindanao in the Philippines to the Bonin Islands, Japan

==== Echinoidea (sea urchins) ====
- †Coelopleurus elegans, a species (Arbaciidae) from the Pleistocene of Japan
- †Catopygus elegans, a synonym for Studeria elegans, an extinct species (Neolampadidae)
- †Cidaris elegans Münster, 1826 (syn. †Cidarites elegans), a fossil species (Cidaridae) from the Jurassic of France
- Cidaris elegans (A. Agassiz, 1879), a synonym for Histocidaris elegans, an extant species (Histocidaridae)

==== †Edrioasteroidea (edrioasteroids) ====
- †Cambraster elegans, an extinct species (family unknown) from the Cambrian

==== Holothuroidea (sea cucumbers) ====
- †Chiridota elegans (syn. †Chirodota elegans), a species (Chiridotidae) from the Pliocene of Europe

=== Chordata (chordates) ===
==== Ascidiacea (ascidians or sea squirts) ====
- Clavelina elegans, a species (Clavelinidae) found in Japan
- Chorizocarpa elegans, a synonym for Botryllus elegans, a species (Styelidae) found in Mozambique and South Africa
- Culeolus elegans, a species (Pyuridae) found in New Caledonia

==== Conodonta (conodonts) ====
- †Curtognathus elegans, an extinct species (Distacodontidae) from the Ordovician of Siberia

==== Osteostraci ====
- †Cephalaspis elegans, a synonym for †Zychaspis elegans, an extinct species (†Scolenaspididae) from the Devonian of Ukraine

==== Chondrichthyes (cartilaginous fishes) ====
- †Chomatodus elegans, a prehistoric species (Petalodontiformes)
- Carcharias elegans, a synonym for Carcharhinus melanopterus, the blacktip reef shark, a requiem shark (Carcharhinidae) inhabiting the tropical coral reefs of the Indian and Pacific oceans
- †Cladodus elegans, an extinct species from the Carboniferous period
- †Cladoselache elegans, an extinct shark from the Devonian period
- †Ctenacanthus elegans, an extinct species (Ctenacanthidae) from the Carboniferous period
- †Cosmacanthus elegans, a synonym for †Nemacanthus elegans, an extinct species (†Paleospinacidae) from the Triassic of Idaho, United States

==== Actinopterygii (ray-finned fishes) ====
===== Perciformes =====
- Callionymus elegans, a synonym for Callionymus lyra, the common dragonet, a species (Callionymidae) widespread in the eastern Atlantic
- Clinus elegans, a synonym for Calliclinus geniguttatus, a marine species (Labrisomidae) native to the Pacific coast of Chile and the Atlantic coast of Argentina
- Coryphaena elegans, a synonym for Luvaris imperialis, the louvar, a marine species (Luvaridae) found in surface waters of temperate and tropical oceans throughout the world
- Cybiosarda elegans, a marine scombrid (Scombridae) found in coastal and oceanic waters of northern Australia and southern New Guinea
- Crenicara elegans, a synonym for Crenicara punctulatum, the checkerboard cichlid, a species (Geophaginae) native to creeks and rivers in the Amazon and Essequibo basins in South America
- Crenicichla elegans, a synonym for Crenicichla reticulata, a species (Cichlinae) native to South America

===== Cyprinodontiformes =====
- Cyprinodon elegans, the Comanche Springs pupfish, a species found in the United States
- Cynodonichthys elegans, a species found in Colombia
- Cynolebias elegans, a synonym for Nematolebias whitei, the Rio pearlfish, a species native to South America
- Cobitis elegans, a synonym for Triplophysa stolickai, the Tibetan stone loach, a species found in southern and central Asia

===== Siluriformes (catfishes) =====
- Corydoras elegans (syn. Corydorus elegans), the elegant corydoras or elegant catfish, a freshwater armored catfish (Callichthyidae) found in the Upper Amazon River basin

===== Cypriniformes =====
- Crossocheilus elegans, a cyprinid (Cyprinidae) found in northern Borneo, Indonesia

===== Characiformes =====
- Curimata elegans or Curimatus elegans, synonyms for Steindachnerina elegans, a species found in rivers in Bahia and Minas Gerais, Brazil
- Curimatus elegans paraguayensis, a synonym for Curimatella dorsalis, a species from the Orinoco, Amazon, Tocantins and Paraguay-lower Paraná River basins

===== Scorpaeniformes =====
- Centridermichthys elegans, a synonym for Bero elegans, a sculpin (Cottidae) native to the northwestern Pacific Ocean

===== Salmoniformes =====
- Coregonus elegans, a synonym for Coregonus pollan, the pollan, a freshwater whitefish (salmonidae) known only from five Irish lakes

==== Sarcopterygii (lobe-finned fishes) ====
- †Ceratodus elegans, an extinct lungfish (Ceratodontiformes, Ptychoceratodontidae) from the Triassic of Germany
- †Coelacanthus elegans, a synonym for Rhabdoderma elegans, an extinct coelacanth fish (Rhabdodermatidae) that lived in the Carboniferous

==== Lissamphibia (amphibians) ====
- Cardioglossa elegans, a species (Arthroleptidae) found in Cameroon, Equatorial Guinea and Gabon
- Cornufer elegans, a species (Ceratobatrachidae) endemic to Papua New Guinea

==== Aves (birds) ====
- †Chlorostilbon elegans, Gould's emerald, a presumed extinct hummingbird (Trochilidae) likely from Jamaica or the Bahamas
- Charadrius elegans, a synonym for Charadrius alexandrinus, the Kentish plover, a cosmopolitan species (Charadriidae)
- Callipepla elegans, a synonym for Callipepla douglasii, the elegant quail, a species (Odontophoridae) endemic to Pacific-slope thorn forest of northwestern Mexico
- Coturnicops elegans, a synonym for Sarothrura elegans, the buff-spotted flufftail, a species (Sarothruridae) found in Africa
- Calocitta elegans, a synonym for Calocitta colliei, the black-throated magpie-jay, a species (Corvidae) found in northwestern Mexico
- Celeus elegans, the chestnut woodpecker, a species (Picidae) found in South America
- Calodromas elegans or Calopezus elegans, synonyms for Eudromia elegans, the elegant crested tinamou or martineta tinamou, a species (Tinamidae) found in southern Chile and Argentina

==== Reptilia (reptiles) ====
===== Serpentes (snakes) =====
- Calamaria elegans, a synonym for Calamaria modesta, a colubrid species (Calamariinae) found in Java
- Coronella elegans Günther, 1858, a synonym for Taeniophallus occipitalis, a colubrid species (Dipsadinae) found in South America
- Coronella elegans Jan, 1863, a synonym for Meizodon regularis, the eastern crowned smooth snake, a colubrid species (Colubrinae) found in Africa
- Coluber elegans, a synonym for Psammophis elegans, the elegant sand racer, a species (Lamprophiidae) found in tropical Africa
- Craspedocephalus elegans, a synonym for Trimeresurus elegans, the elegant pitviper, a species (Viperidae) endemic to Japan
- Cursoria elegans or Cusoria elegans, synonyms for Eryx elegans, a species (Boidae) found in western Central Asia

===== Gekkonidae (geckos) =====
- Coleonyx elegans, the Yucatán banded gecko, an eyelid gecko (Eublepharinae) found in Mexico, Guatemala and Belize
- Cyrtopodion elegans, a synonym for Cyrtopodion elongatum, the Yangihissar gecko, a species (Gekkoninae) found in northwest China and Mongolia

===== Testudines (turtles) =====
- Chersine elegans, a synonym for Geochelone elegans, the Indian star tortoise, a species (Testudinidae) found in dry areas and scrub forest in India and Sri Lanka
- Chrysemys elegans, a synonym for Trachemys scripta elegans, the red-eared slider, a pond turtle (Emydidae)
- Cyclanorbis elegans, the Nubian flapshell turtle, a softshell (Trionychidae) found in Africa

===== Pseudosuchia =====
- †Chatterjeea elegans, a synonym for †Shuvosaurus inexpectatus, an extinct species of beaked reptiles (†Shuvosauridae) from the Late Triassic of Texas
- †Cricosaurus elegans, an extinct marine crocodyliform (Metriorhynchidae) from the Late Jurassic to Early Cretaceous

===== †Pterosauria =====
- †Ctenochasma elegans, an extinct species of pterosaurs (†Ctenochasmatidae) of the Late Jurassic of Germany and France

===== Non-avian Dinosauria (non-avian dinosaurs) =====
- †Citipes elegans (syn. Chirostenotes elegans), an extinct species of oviraptorosaurian dinosaur (†Caenagnathidae) from the Late Cretaceous of Alberta, Canada known from a few leg bones, part of the hip, and a lower jaw

==== Mammalia (mammals) ====
- †Cynodictis elegans, an extinct species of bear dog (†Amphicyonidae) from the Eocene–Oligocene of Eurasia
- †Caenotherium elegans or Cainotherium elegans, synonyms for Cainotherium laticurvatum, an extinct species of rabbit-sized even-toed ungulate (†Cainotheriidae) from the Eocene-Miocene of Europe
- †Choilodon elegans, an extinct species (?Tragulidae, the chevrotains) found in phosphorites in Quercy, France
- Chrysochloris elegans, a synonym for Chrysochloris asiatica, the Cape golden mole (Chrysochloridae) found in South Africa
- †Cayluxotherium elegans, a synonym for †Neurogymnurus cayluxi, an extinct species of hedgehogs (Erinaceidae) from the Oligocene of France
- †Camphotherium elegans or †Comphotherium elegans, synonyms for †Tetracus nanus, an extinct species of hedgehogs (Erinaceidae) from the Oligocene of Belgium, France and southern England
- Capromys elegans, a synonym for Phloeomys cumingi, the southern giant slender-tailed cloud rat, a species (Muridae) found only in the Philippines
- Citellus elegans, a synonym for Urocitellus elegans, the Wyoming ground squirrel, a species (Sciuridae) endemic to the northwestern United States

=== Hemichordata (hemichordates) ===
- †Callograptus elegans, an extinct graptolite species (†Dendrograptidae) from the Quebec Group

=== Xenacoelomorpha ===
- Convoluta elegans, an acoel species (Convolutidae) found in the Black Sea

=== Nematoda (nematodes or roundworms) ===
- Caenorhabditis elegans, a species (Rhabditidae) extensively used as a model in developmental biology
- Camallanus elegans, a synonym for Camallanus lacustris, a freshwater species (Camallanidae) parasitic of fish
- Chilenchus elegans, a parasitic species (Tylenchidae) found in Chile
- Chronogaster elegans, a species (Leptolaimidae) found in fresh water in the United States
- Cloacina elegans, a parasite of marsupials in Australia
- Craspedonema elegans, a parasitic species (Bunonematidae) found in Brazil
- Crassolabium elegans, a species (Qudsianematidae) from the northern Great Plains
- Cucullanus elegans, an endoparasite (Cucullanidae) of the European perch
- Cyartonema elegans, a free-living marine species (Cyartonematidae) found in Scotland
- Cyclostrongylus elegans, an oesophageal parasite (Cloacininae) of macropodid marsupials in Australia

=== Arthropoda (arthropods) ===
==== Insecta (insects) ====
===== †Alienoptera =====
- †Caputoraptor elegans, an extinct species (†Alienopteridae) from the Late Cretaceous of Myanmar

===== Blattodea (cockroaches) =====
- Calolampra elegans, a giant cockroach (Blaberidae) found in Queensland, Australia
- Corydia elegans, a synonym for Eucorydia aenea, a species (Corydiidae) found in Asia

===== Coleoptera (beetles and weevils) =====
====== Cerambycidae (longhorn beetles) ======
- Centrocerum elegans, a species found in Brazil, Bolivia, Paraguay and Argentina
- Cordylomera elegans, a species found in South Africa
- Callichroma elegans, Cerambix elegans or Cerambyx elegans, synonyms for Mionochroma elegans, a species found in Guadeloupe, Grenada, Dominica and St. Lucia
- Callichroma elegans Haldeman, 1847 nec Olivier, 1790, a synonym for Plinthocoelium suaveolens
- Calliprason elegans, a species (Stenoderini) found in New Zealand
- Championa elegans, a species (Heteropsini) found in Mexico
- Clytus elegans, a synonym for Neoclytus scutellaris a species (Clytini) found in the United States
- Coleoxestia elegans or Criodion elegans, synonyms for Poeciloxestia elegans a species (Cerambycini) found in Brazil
- Cacia elegans, a species (Mesosini)
- Callienispia elegans, a synonym for Egesina elegans, a species (Pteropliini)
- Catharesthes elegans, a species (Acanthocinini)
- Ceroplesis elegans, a species (Ceroplesini) found in Saudi Arabia and Yemen
- Chariesthes elegans, a synonym for Chariesthes bella, a species (Tragocephalini) found in Africa
- Cyriocrates elegans, a synonym for Anoplophora elegans, a species (Lamiini) found in Southeast Asia

====== Chrysomelidae (leaf beetles) ======
- Callidemum elegans, currently Paropsimorpha elegans, a species found in Australia
- Calligrapha elegans or Chrysomela elegans, synonyms for Calligrapha californica, a species (Chrysomelini) found in the United States and Canada
- Crosita elegans, a species with a Palaearctic distribution
- Cyrtonus elegans, a species found in Portugal
- Callispa elegans, a species found in southern Asia
- Callistola elegans a species (Cryptonychini) found in the western Pacific
- Coptocycla elegans, a species found in Brazil
- Cneorane elegans, a species (Galerucini) found in Japan and Korea

====== Megalopodidae ======
- Colobaspis elegans, a species (Megalopodinae) found in Taiwan

====== Endomychidae (handsome fungus beetles) ======
- Chondria elegans, a species found in Malaysia
- Corynomalus elegans, a species (Lycoperdininae) found in Ecuador
- Cymbachus elegans, a species (Lycoperdininae) found in Laos

====== Latridiidae (minute brown scavenger beetles) ======
- Cartodere elegans, a species found in Europe

====== Nitidulidae (sap beetles) ======
- Calosphaera elegans or Cryptarcha elegans, synonyms for Eucalosphaera elegans a species (Cryptarchinae) found in Perak, Malaysia

====== Cleridae (checkered beetles) ======
- Callotillus elegans, a synonym for Neocallotillus elegans, a species (Tillinae) found in Texas, California and Arizona
- Chariessa elegans, a species found in the United States

====== Melyridae (soft-winged flower beetles) ======
- Carphurus elegans, a species (Malachiinae, Carphurini) found in Queensland, Australia
- Clanoptilus elegans, a species found in Europe

====== Curculionidae (true weevils) ======
- Callizonus elegans, a synonym for Praepodes elegans, a species (not yet assigned to a subfamily) found in Cuba
- Ceutorhynchus elegans, a species (Baridinae, Ceutorhynchini) with a Palaearctic distribution
- Coniatus elegans, a species (Hyperinae) found in Syria
- Conotrachelus elegans, the pecan gall curculio, a species (Molytinae) found in North America
- Cryptorhynchus elegans, a species (Cryptorhynchinae) found in North America
- Centrinaspis elegans, a species found in Brazil
- Cleopus elegans, a species (Cionini) found in Italy
- Calandra elegans, a species
- Curculio elegans, a synonym for Sphenophorus abbreviatus, a species (Rhynchophorini) found in Europe
- Cyrtotrachelus elegans, a species (Rhynchophorini) found in the Philippines
- Chaerodrys elegans, a synonym for Metadrosus bellus, a species (Polydrosini) found in southern Europe
- Chiloneus elegans, a species (Sciaphilini) found in Greece
- Compsus elegans, a species (Eustylini)
- Coptorhynchus elegans, a species (Celeuthetini) found in Indonesia
- Cnesinus elegans a species (Bothrosternini) found in Mexico
- Coptodryas elegans, a species (Xyleborini) found in Myanmar, India, Indonesia and the Pacific
- Cosmoderes elegans, a species (Cryphalini) found in New Guinea

====== Attelabidae (leaf-rolling weevils) ======
- Catalabus elegans, a species found in India

====== Brentidae (straight-snouted weevils) ======
- Cerobates elegans, a species found in Africa

====== Tenebrionidae (darkling beetles) ======
- Cephalostenus elegans, a species (Tenebrioninae) found in Greece
- Colposcelis elegans a species (Pimeliinae, Tentyriini) with a Palaearctic distribution in Asia
- Cryptochile elegans, a species (Pimeliinae, Cryptochilini) found in Kenya

====== Scarabaeidae (scarab beetles) ======
- Ceraspis elegans, a species (Melolonthinae, Macrodactylini) found in Brazil and Central America (Honduras)
- Canthon elegans or Choeridium elegans, synonyms for Canthon quadriguttatus, a species (Scarabaeinae, Canthonini) found in Brazil, Colombia and Suriname
- Calopotosia elegans, a synonym for Protaetia elegans, a species (Cetoniini) found in Taiwan
- Cetonia elegans Leoni, 1910, a synonym for Cetonia aurata pisana, a subspecies (Cetoniini) of the rose chafer
- Cetonia elegans Fabricius, 1781, a synonym for Heterorhina elegans, a species (Goliathini) found in India and Sri Lanka
- Chrysoliocola elegans
- Coptomia elegans, a synonym for Pyrrhopoda elegans, a species (Stenotarsiini) found in Madagascar
- Coryphocera elegans, a species found in Senegal
- Cyclocephala elegans, a synonym for Cyclocephala melanocephala, a species found in North and Central America

====== Lucanidae (stag beetles) ======
- Cladognathus elegans, a synonym for Digonophorus elegans, a species found in India

====== Elateridae (click beetles) ======
- Cardiophorus elegans, a species found in Chile
- Cardiorhinus elegans, a species found in Brazil
- †Cardiosyne elegans, an extinct species from the Triassic of Argentina
- Compsoctenus elegans, a species (Prosterninae) found in Chile
- Conoderus elegans, a species (Agrypninae) with a Palaearctic distribution
- Ctenicera elegans (syn. Corymbites elegans), a species (Prosterninae) found in Canada

====== Cantharidae (soldier beetles) ======
- Cordylocera elegans

====== Lycidae (net-winged beetles) ======
- Cautires elegans, a species (Lycinae)

====== Buprestidae (jewel beetles) ======
- Chalcogenia elegans
- Chrysochroa elegans, the Japanese jewel beetle (tamamushi in Japanese), a species (Chrysochroinae) found in Japan
- Clema elegans

====== Elmidae (riffle beetles) ======
- Ctenelmis elegans, a species found near rivers in South Africa

====== Staphylinidae (rove beetles) ======
- Catalina elegans, a species (Aleocharinae) with an Afrotropical distribution
- Cephalochetus elegans (syn. Calliderma elegans), a species (Paederini, Echiasterina) found in Sri Lanka
- Cryptobium elegans, a synonym for Ochthephilum elegans, a species (Paederini, Cryptobiina) found in Australia
- Centrophthalmus elegans, a species (Tyrini) with a Palaearctic distribution
- Chandleria elegans, a species (Metopiasini) found in Panama

====== Hydrophilidae (water scavenger beetles) ======
- Creniphilus elegans, a synonym for Paracymus elegans, a species (Hydrophilinae) found in southern California

====== Carabidae (ground beetles) ======
- Calosoma elegans (syn. Callisthenes elegans), a species (Carabini) found in Kazakhstan
- Collyris elegans, (syn. Colliuris elegans Vanderl., 1829), a species (Collyridini) found in Java
- Caledonomorpha elegans, a species found in New Guinea
- Cephalota elegans (syn. Cicindela elegans Fourcroy & Geoffroy, 1785), a species (Cicindelini) found in Russia
- Catascopus elegans, a species found in Southeast Asia and Australia
- Colliuris elegans (Guérin-Méneville, 1855), a species (Odacanthini) found in Brazil
- Cymindis elegans, a species found in the United States
- Callistomimus elegans, a species found in South Africa
- Chlaenius elegans
- Carenum elegans, a species from Western Australia
- Clivina elegans, a species found in Australia
- Caelostomus elegans, a species (Pterostichinae)
- Cimmerites elegans, a species (Trechinae)
- Colpodes elegans, a species (Platyninae)
- Craspedophorus elegans, a species (Panagaeinae)
- Cypholoba elegans, a synonym for Cypholoba divisa, a species (Anthiinae)

====== Coptoclavidae ======
- †Coptoclavella elegans, an extinct species from the Cretaceous of Mongolia

====== Dytiscidae (diving beetles) ======
- Colymbetes elegans, a synonym for Copelatus posticatus, a species (Copelatinae)

===== Dermaptera (earwigs) =====
- Chelisoches elegans, a synonym for Euenkrates elegans, a species (Chelisochidae) found in Sumatra and Java

===== Diptera (flies, mosquitoes, midges and gnats) =====
Suborder Brachycera (brachyceran flies)

Infraorder Asilomorpha (asilomorphs)

- Calohilara elegans, a synonym for Hilara elegans, a species (Empididae) found in Myanmar
- Cerdistus elegans, a species (Asilidae) found in Tunisia
- Chrysotus elegans, a synonym for Chrysotus longipalpus, a long-legged fly (Dolichopodidae) found worldwide
- Cytherea elegans, a bee fly (Bombyliidae) found in France

Infraorder Muscomorpha (muscomorphs)
Family Syrphidae (hoverflies)
Subfamily Eristalinae

- Chalcosyrphus elegans, a species (Xylotini) found in Myanmar
- Chrysogaster elegans, a synonym for Orthonevra elegans, a species (Brachyopini) found in Europe

Subfamily Syrphinae

- Chrysotoxum elegans, a species (Syrphini) found in southern mainland Europe

Family Chloropidae (frit flies)

- Chloropsina elegans (syn. Chromatopterum elegans), a species (Chloropinae) found in the Philippines
- Conioscinella elegans, a species (Oscinellinae) found in Europe

Other muscomorphs

- Callomyia elegans, a flat-footed fly (Platypezidae) found in Europe
- Cardiacephala elegans, a synonym for Plocoscelus podagricus, a species (Micropezidae) found in Brazil and Peru
- Cecidocharella elegans, a fruit fly (Tephritidae) found in Brazil
- Cestrotus elegans, a species (Lauxaniidae) found in Ethiopia and Morocco
- Chamaemyia elegans, a species (Chamaemyiidae) present in Europe
- Chelisia elegans, a synonym for Anthomyia obscuripennis, a species (Anthomyiidae) found in the United States
- Coenosia elegans, a house fly (Muscidae) found in Alaska
- Conops elegans, a thick-headed fly (Conopidae) found in Cyprus, France and Spain
- Chyliza elegans, a species of rust fly (Psilidae) found in Taiwan
- Cryptomeigenia elegans, a tachinid fly (Tachinidae) found in Mexico
- Cuterebra elegans, a synonym for Cuterebra rufiventris, a rodent bot fly (Oestridae, Cuterebrinae) found in Brazil and Peru

Infraorder Tabanomorpha (tabanomorphs)
Family Rhagionidae (snipe flies)

- Coenura elegans (syn. Caenura elegans), a species found in Chile
- Chrysopilus elegans, a species found from Costa Rica to Peru

Stratiomyidae (soldier flies)

- Cyphomyia elegans, a synonym for Euparyphus elegans, a species (Stratiomyinae, Oxycerini) found in Mexico

Suborder Nematocera (mosquitoes, midges and gnats)
Infrorder Bibionomorpha (bibionomorphs)

- Cecidomyia elegans, a gall midge (Cecidomyiidae) found in Germany
- Corynoptera elegans, a dark-winged fungus gnat (Sciaridae) found in Argentina

Infrorder Tipulomorpha

- Ctenophora elegans, a true crane-fly (Tipulidae) found in Europe

Infraorder Culicomorpha
Family Chironomidae (nonbiting midges)

- Chironomus elegans, a synonym for Eurycnemus crassipes, a species (Orthocladiinae) found in Europe
- Cricotopus elegans, a species (Orthocladiinae) found in Europe

Family Culicidae (mosquitoes)

- Culex elegans, a species (Culicinae), possibly a synonym for Aedes aegypti

===== Hemiptera (true bugs) =====
Suborder Heteroptera
Infraorder Cimicomorpha

- Cardiastethus elegans, a species (Anthocoridae) with a neotropical distribution
- Coranus elegans, an assassin bug (Reduviidae, Harpactorinae) found in Africa
- Corythucha elegans, the willow lace bug, a lace bug (Tingidae) found on willows in North America

Family Miridae

- Capsodes elegans, a synonym for Capsodes gothicus, a species (Mirinae) found in Europe
- †Closterocoris elegans, an extinct species (Mirinae) found in the Eocene Florissant Formation of Colorado
- Compsocerocoris elegans, a species found in Central America

Infraorder Nepomorpha (true water bugs)

- †Corixa elegans, an extinct species (Corixidae) from the Oligocene of Germany

Infraorder Pentatomomorpha
Superfamily Pentatomoidea (shield bugs)
Family Pentatomidae (stink bugs), subfamily Pentatominae

- Cephaloplatus elegans, a species (Carpocorini) found in the Northern Territory, Australia
- Commius elegans (syn. Cimex elegans), a species (Diemeniini) found in Australia
- Cyptocephala elegans, a species (Pentatomini) found in Illinois

Family Plataspidae

- Coptosoma elegans, a species (Platasdinae) found in Europe

Superfamily Coreoidea

- Cercinthus elegans (syn. Coreus elegans), a species (Coreidae) found in the Canary Islands

Superfamily Lygaeoidea

- Carvalhodrymus elegans, a species (Rhyparochromidae) found in Ghana and Cameroon
- Cymus elegans, a species (Lygaeidae) found in Korea

Suborder Auchenorrhyncha
Superfamily Fulgoroidea (fulgoroids)

- Calyptoproctus elegans, a lanternfly (Fulgoridae) found in Suriname, Brazil, French Guiana and Honduras
- Cromna elegans, a synonym for Siphanta acuta, the green planthopper or the torpedo bug, a species (Flatidae)

Infraorder Cicadomorpha, superfamily Membracoidea

- Callistrophia elegans , a synonym for Taurotettix elegans, a hopper (Cicadellidae, Deltocephalinae, Cicadulini) found in Asia

Suborder Sternorrhyncha (aphids, whiteflies and scale insects)
Superfamily Aphidoidea (aphids or plant lice)

- Callipterus elegans, a synonym for Tinocallis platani, a species (Aphididae, Calaphidinae) found in Europe and North America

Superfamily Psylloidea

- Cacopsylla elegans, a species (Psyllidae) found in Japan
- Colposcenia elegans, a species (Aphalaridae, Aphalarinae) with a Palaearctic distribution in northern and eastern Africa and the Middle East

===== Hymenoptera (ants, bees, wasps and sawflies) =====
Suborder Apocrita (ants, bees and wasps)
Superfamily Vespoidea
Family Pompilidae (spider wasps)

- Ceropales elegans, a species (Ceropalinae) found in Texas
- Cryptocheilus elegans, a species (Pepsinae) found in Europe

Family Formicidae (ants)

- Camponotus elegans, a carpenter ant (Formicinae) found in south east Queensland and Western Australia
- Cardiocondyla elegans, a species (Myrmicinae) found in the Mediterranean region
- Cerapachys elegans, a species (Dorylinae) found in Australia
- Conomyrma elegans, a synonym for Dorymyrmex elegans, a species (Dolichoderinae) endemic to the United States and Mexico
- Crematogaster elegans, a species (Myrmicinae) found on the Aru and Kai islands, Indonesia

Superfamily Apoidea
Clade Anthophila (bees)
Family Apidae

- Centris elegans, a species (Apinae) found on Saint Vincent and Grenadines
- Crocisa elegans, a synonym for Thyreus elegans, a species (Apinae) found in Eurasia and Africa

Family Colletidae (plasterer bees)

- Caupolicana elegans a species found in Mexico and the United States
- Colletes elegans, a ground-nesting species found in Israel

Family Crabronidae

- Cerceris elegans, a species found in Russia

Superfamily Ichneumonoidea
Family Braconidae (braconid wasps)

- Calaphidius elegans, a parasitoid species (Aphidiinae) found in Europe
- Chelonus elegans, a species (Cheloninae)
- Chrysopophthorus elegans, a synonym for Chrysopophthorus hungaricus, a parasitoid species (Euphorinae) found in northern Italy and introduced in Great Britain
- Coelinidea elegans (syn. Chaenon elegans or Coelinius elegans), a species of parasitoid wasps (Alysiinae) found in Europe

Subfamily Braconinae

- Callibracon elegans, a species (Braconini)
- Campyloneurus elegans, a species (Braconini) found in Cameroon

Family Ichneumonidae

- Campodorus elegans, a parasitic wasp (Ctenopelmatinae, Mesoleiini) found in England
- Cryptanuridimorpha elegans, a synonym for Polycyrtus vierecki, a species (Gelinae, Cryptini) found in Peru

Subfamily Campopleginae, tribe Limneriini

- Campoplex elegans, a synonym for Dusona elegans, a parasitic wasp found in Tanzania
- Cymodusa elegans , a synonym for Nemeritis elegans, a parasitic wasp found in Europe

Superfamily Platygastroidea

- Calliscelio elegans (syn. Caloteleia elegans), a parasitoid wasp (Platygastridae) found on the Hawaiian island of Oʻahu

Superfamily Chalcidoidea (chalcid wasps)

- Cerachalcis elegans or Cratocentrus elegans, synonyms for Cratocentrus ruficornis, a species (Chalcididae) found in Namibia, South Africa and Zimbabwe
- Chaetospila elegans or Choetospila elegans, synonyms for Theocolax elegans, a parasitic wasp (Pteromalidae) of immature stages of stored grain pest insects
- Cheiloneurus elegans (syn. Cleonymus elegans), a parasitic wasp (Encyrtidae)
- Chrysolampus elegans, a species (Perilampidae) with a Nearctic distribution
- Cosmocoma elegans, a synonym for Polynema howardii, a species of fairyflies or fairy wasps (Mymaridae) with a Nearctic distribution

Superfamily Chrysidoidea
Family Chrysididae (cuckoo wasps)

- Chrysis elegans, a species (Chrysidinae) found in southern Europe
- Cleptes elegans, a synonym for Cleptes semicyaneus, a species (Cleptinae) found in Europe

===== Lepidoptera (butterflies and moths) =====
Suborder Rhopalocera (butterflies)
Superfamily Papilionoidea
Family Lycaenidae (gossamer-winged butterflies)

- Catapaecilma elegans, the common tinsel, a species found in Asia

Family Nymphalidae (brush-footed butterflies)

- Clossiana elegans, a synonym for Boloria improba improbula
- Cyrestis elegans, a synonym for Cyrestis camillus elegans, a species (Cyrestinae) known from Madagascar

Family Pieridae

- Colias elegans, a synonym for Colias phicomone, the mountain clouded yellow, a species (Coliadinae) found in the Cantabrian Mountains, the Pyrenees, the Carpathian Mountains and the Alps

Superfamily Hesperioidea
Family Hesperiidae (skipper butterflies)

- Callimormus elegans, a synonym for Callimormus radiola elegans, a subspecies of the radiant skipper (Hesperiinae) found in southern Mexico, Ecuador, Brazil, Colombia and Argentina
- Chapra elegans, a species
- Cobalopsis elegans, a species (Hesperiinae) found in Ecuador

Division Ditrysia
Superfamily Pyraloidea (pyraloid moths)
Family Pyralidae (snout moths)

- Cacozelia elegans, a species found in Venezuela

Family Crambidae (grass moths)

- Circobotys elegans, a species found in Taiwan
- Crambus elegans, a synonym for Microcrambus elegans, the elegant grass-veneer moth, a species (Crambinae) found in North America
- Cryptographis elegans, a species (Pyraustinae) found in Puerto Rico

Superfamily Gelechioidea (curved-horn moths)

- Cacogamia elegans, a synonym for Tisis elegans, a species (Lecithoceridae) found on Java
- Coleophora elegans, a species (Coleophoridae) found in Africa

Superfamily Zygaenoidea
Family Limacodidae (slug moths)

- Casphalia elegans, a species found in Ghana
- Compsopsectra elegans, a species found in the Philippines
- Cyrtosia elegans, a synonym for Packardia elegans, the elegant tailed slug moth, a species (Limacodinae) found in Canada and the United States

Superfamily Lasiocampoidea

- Catalebeda elegans, an eggar (Lasiocampidae) found in Africa

Section Cossina
Subsection Cossina
Superfamily Cossoidea
Family Cossidae (carpenter millers)

- Callocossus elegans, a synonym for Eulophonotus elegans, a species (Zeuzerinae) found in Sierra Leone, Cameroon, the Republic of the Congo, Equatorial Guinea and Tanzania
- Costria elegans, a species (Cossinae) found in South America

Superfamily Tortricoidea, family Tortricidae (tortrix moths)

- Cochylimorpha elegans, a species (Tortricinae) found in Iran

Subsection Bombycina
Superfamily Bombycoidea (bombycoid moths)
Family Sphingidae (hawk moths)

- Callionima elegans, a synonym for Callionima grisescens, a species (Macroglossinae)
- Chaerocampa elegans, a synonym for Hippotion echeclus, a species (Macroglossinae) found in Southeast Asia

Superfamily Geometroidea
Family Geometridae (geometer moths)
Subfamily Ennominae

- Callhistia elegans, a species (Boarmiini)
- Cleora elegans, a synonym for Cleora leucophaea, a species found in Russia, Taiwan, Japan and South Korea
- Colpocraspeda elegans, a species found in Papua New Guinea

Subfamily Larentiinae

- Coenocalpe elegans, a species (Melanthiini) found in North America

Superfamily Noctuoidea
Family Noctuidae (owlet moths)

- Chersotis elegans, a species found in the mountains of Spain, Greece, Turkey, the Caucasus and Lebanon
- Chytonix elegans, a species from Costa Rica
- Conistra elegans, a species
- Cosmodes elegans, the green-blotched moth, a species found in Australia and New Zealand

Family Erebidae
Subfamily Arctiinae (tiger moths)

- Correbia elegans a species (Euchromiina) found in Panama
- Correbidia elegans, a species found in Mexico and Panama
- Cosmosoma elegans, a species found in Brazil

Subfamily Lymantriinae

- Calliteara elegans, a synonym for Mpanjaka elegans, a species (Lymantrini) found in Madagascar

Family Nolidae (tuft moths)

- Cacyparis elegans, a species found in the Solomon Islands

===== Mantodea (mantises) =====
- Caliris elegans, a species found in Malaysia, Sumatra and Borneo
- Calofulcinia elegans, a species found in New Guinea

===== Neuroptera (net-winged insects) =====
Family Ascalaphidae (owlflies)

- Cordulecerus elegans, a species found in South America

Family Chrysopidae (green lacewings)

- Ceraeochrysa elegans, a species found in Costa Rica
- Chrysopidia elegans, a species found in China and Nepal

Family Myrmeleontidae (antlions)

- Creoleon elegans, a species (Myrmeleontinae) found in Iran

===== Odonata (dragonflies and damselflies) =====
Suborder Epiprocta

- †Campterophlebia elegans, an extinct species (†Campterophlebiidae) from the Jurassic of Germany

Suborder Zygoptera (damselflies)

- Chlorolestes elegans, a sylph (Synlestidae) found in Botswana, Malawi, Mozambique, South Africa and Zimbabwe
- Calopteryx elegans, a synonym for Calopteryx angustipennis, the Appalachian jewelwing, a species (Calopterygidae) endemic to the United States

===== Orthoptera (crickets and grasshoppers) =====
====== Caelifera (grasshoppers) ======
- Calephorus elegans, a synonym for Calephorus compressicornis, French name: Criquet des dunes, a species found in France, Spain and Africa
- Caryanda elegans (Bolívar, 1911), a synonym for Caryanda modesta, a species
- Caryanda elegans Bolívar, 1918, a synonym for Caryanda neoelegans, a species
- Cataloipus elegans, a synonym for Cataloipus cognatus, a species found in Asia (India, Pakistan) and Africa (Mozambique, Zimbabwe, South Africa)
- Catantops elegans or Cryptocatantops elegans, synonyms for Cryptocatantops debilis, a species (Catantopini) found in Namibia
- Chitaura elegans, a species found in Indo-Malaysia
- Chlorizeina elegans, a synonym for Chlorizeina unicolor unicolor, a species found in Asia
- Chloromastax elegans, a synonym for Apteropeoedes elegans, a species found in Madagascar
- Chortoicetes elegans, a synonym for Chortoicetes terminifera, the Australian plague locust
- Clinocephalus elegans, a synonym for Dichromorpha elegans, the short-winged grasshopper
- Cyphocerastis elegans, a species found in Africa

====== Ensifera ======
- Ceuthophilus elegans, a cave cricket found in the United States
- Clonia elegans, a synonym for Clonia melanoptera, the giant black-winged clonia, a predatory katydid found in South Africa
- Coptaspis elegans, a bush cricket found in Australia

===== Psocodea (bark lice, book lice and parasitic lice) =====
- Caecilius elegans, a synonym for Valenzuela elegans, a species of lizard barklice (Caeciliusidae) found in Haiti and the Hispaniola island
- Campanulotes elegans, a species parasite on the brush bronzewing, a bird in the pigeon family endemic to Australia
- Colpostigma elegans, a synonym for Thyrsopsocus elegans, a species (Psocidae) found in Brazil
- Compsocus elegans, a species (Compsocidae) found in Central America

===== Trichoptera (caddisflies) =====
- †Cretapsyche elegans, an extinct species (Dysoneuridae) from the Late Cretaceous of Myanmar

==== Collembola (springtails) ====
- Cryptopygus elegans, a slender springtail (Entomobryidae) found in Argentina

==== Branchiopoda (branchiopods) ====
===== Spinicaudata (spinicaudatans) =====
- †Congestheriella elegans, an extinct species of branchiopods (†Afrograptidae) from the Upper Jurassic

==== Copepoda (copepods) ====
===== Calanoida (calanoids) =====
- Calanus elegans, a synonym for Calanus finmarchicus, a species (Calanidae) part of zooplankton found in enormous amounts in the northern Atlantic Ocean
- Calocalanus elegans, a marine species (Calocalanidae) found in the Canaries, Indian Ocean, Mediterranean Sea, Red Sea and sub-Antarctic waters
- Centropages elegans, a marine species (Centropagidae)

===== Cyclopoida (cyclopoids) =====
- Cyclopinodes elegans (syn. Cyclopina elegans or Cyclopinoides elegans), a marine species (Cyclopinidae) found in Scotland
- Cyclops elegans, a freshwater species (Cyclopidae)

===== Siphonostomatoida =====
- Caligus elegans or Caligulus elegans, synonyms for Caligus curtus, a sea louse (Caligidae) parasite of the Atlantic cod
- Collocheres elegans, a species (Asterocheridae) found in the British Isles and western Norway infesting the black brittle star

==== Malacostraca (malacostracans) ====
===== Isopoda (isopods) =====
- Cancricepon elegans (syn. Cepon elegans), a species that parasitises the crab Pilumnus hirtellus from French and Great Britain's waters
- Clianella elegans, a synonym for Dynoides elegans, a species found in California
- Cymothoa elegans, a parasitic species found in the Java Sea

===== Cumacea (cumaceans) =====
- Chalarostylis elegans
- Cyclaspis elegans

===== Decapoda (decapods) =====
- Calcinus elegans, the elegant hermit, a hermit crab (Diogenidae) found in the Indo-West Pacific region
- †Callianassa elegans, an extinct species (Callianassidae) from Java
- Choniognathus elegans, a crab (Majidae) found in South Africa
- Cuapetes elegans, a shrimp (Palaemonidae)

===== Amphipoda (amphipods) =====
- Caprellinoides elegans

==== Ostracoda (ostracods) ====
===== Halocyprida =====
- Conchoecia elegans, a synonym for Discoconchoecia elegans, a species (Halocypridae) found in Norway

===== †Palaeocopida =====
- †Cystomatochilina elegans, an extinct species (†Eurychilinidae) from the Silurian of central Bohemia, Czech Republic

===== Podocopida =====
Family Cytheridae

- †Cytherideis elegans, an extinct species from the Quaternary of Sicily

Family Cyprididae

- Chlamydotheca elegans, a freshwater species (Cypridinae) found in Colombia
- Cypricercus elegans, a freshwater species (Cypricercinae) found in Colombia

Family Leptocytheridae

- Callistocythere elegans (syn. Cythere elegans), a species from the Gulf of Naples, Italy

==== Arachnida (arachnids) ====
===== Araneae (spiders) =====
Infraorder Mygalomorphae (mygalomorphs)
Family Dipluridae (funnel-web tarantulas)

- Caledothele elegans, a species found in New Caledonia
- Cethegus elegans, a species found in Queensland

Family Theraphosidae (tarantulas)

- Cyriocosmus elegans, a species found in Venezuela, Trinidad and Tobago

Infraorder Araneomorphae (araneomorphs)
Family Eutichuridae

- Cheiracanthium elegans, a species found in Europe and Central Asia

Family Gnaphosidae (ground spiders)

- Camillina elegans, a species found in the Caribbean, in Angola and in the Pacific Islands
- Cesonia elegans, a species found on St. Vincent, Dominica

Family Linyphiidae (sheet weavers)

- Cnephalocotes elegans, a synonym for Silometopus elegans, a species found in Europe

Family Salticidae (jumping spiders)

- Chalcoscirtus elegans, a synonym for Rogmocrypta elegans a species (Hisponinae) found in New Caledonia and the Philippines
- Cyrene elegans, a synonym for Phiale elegans, a species found in Panama

Family Stiphidiidae (sheetweb spiders)

- Cambridgea elegans, a species found in New Zealand

Family Tetragnathidae (long-jawed orb weavers)

- Callinethis elegans, a synonym for Opadometa fastigata, the pear-shaped leucauge, a species (Leucauginae) found in India to the Philippines and Sulawesi

Family Theridiidae

- Chrysso elegans, a synonym for Chrysso albomaculata, a species found in the United States, the West Indies to Brazil

===== Pseudoscorpiones (pseudoscorpions) =====
Superfamily Cheliferoidea, family Chernetidae

- Chelifer elegans, a synonym for Mesochernes elegans, a species found in Venezuela
- Chrysochernes elegans, a species found in New Mexico, United States

Superfamily Cheiridioidea

- Cryptocheiridium elegans (syn. Cubanocheiridium elegans), a species (Cheiridiidae) found in Cuba

Superfamily Chthonioidea

- Cryptoditha elegans, a species (Tridenchthoniidae) found in Brazil

Superfamily Garypoidea

- Calocheiridius elegans, a species (Olpiidae) found in India

===== Opiliones (harvestmen) =====
- Caelopygus elegans, a species found in Brazil
- Carinostoma elegans, a species found in Hungary
- Cereatta elegans, a species found in Cameroon

===== Scorpiones (scorpions) =====
- Centruroides elegans (syn. Centrurus elegans), a species (Buthidae) found in Mexico
- †Compsoscorpius elegans, an extinct species from the Carboniferous of France and the United Kingdom

==== Acari (mites) ====
- Colopalpus elegans, a synonym for Tenuipalpus elegans, a flat mite (Tenuipalpidae)
- Cubanohydracarus elegans, a species (Hungarohydracaridae) found in Cuba

==== †Trilobita (trilobites) ====
- †Conocephalites elegans, a synonym for †Bailiaspis elegans, an extinct species (†Conocoryphidae) from the Cambrian
- †Coronocephalus elegans, an extinct species (†Encrinuridae) from the Silurian of China
- †Costonia elegans, a species (†Trinucleidae) from the Ordovician of South Shropshire, England
- †Cyclagnostus elegans, a synonym for Acmarhachis elegans, an extinct species (†Agnostidae) from the Upper Cambrian of the USSR

==== Myriapoda (myriapods) ====
- Cormocephalus elegans, a species (Scolopendridae) found in North Africa

=== Mollusca (molluscs) ===
==== Gastropoda (gastropods) ====
Clade Caenogastropoda
Superfamily †Paleostyloidea

- †Cheilotomona elegans, an extinct marine species (†Goniasmatidae) from the Triassic of Guizhou Province, China

Clade Architaenioglossa, superfamily Cyclophoroidea

- †Craspedopoma elegans, an extinct species (Craspedopomatidae or Maizaniidae) from the Miocene of Germany
- Cyclophorus elegans, a species (Cyclophoridae) found in China
- Cochlostoma elegans, a land snail (Cochlostomatidae) found on the island of Pag in Croatia

Clade Hypsogastropoda
Clade Littorinimorpha

- Capulus elegans (syn. Capula elegans), a sea snail (Capulidae)
- Constantia elegans, a sea snail (Vanikoridae) found in Japan
- Cyclostoma elegans, a synonym for Pomatias elegans, the round-mouthed snail, a land snail (Pomatiidae) common in southern Europe
- Cyclostrema elegans, a synonym for Adeorbis elegans, a sea snail (Tornidae)
- †Cypraedia elegans (syn. Cypraea elegans or Cypraeovula elegans), a sea snail (Pediculariidae) from the Eocene Europe

Superfamily Naticoidea

- Choristes elegans, a synonym for Amauropsis islandica, the Iceland moonsnail, a predatory sea snail (Naticidae)

Superfamily Rissooidea

- Caecum elegans, a synonym for Caecum trachea, a minute sea snail (Caecidae) found on rocky shores in European waters
- Cingula elegans, a synonym for Peringiella elegans, a species (Rissoidae)

Superfamily Stromboidea

- †Chenopus elegans, a synonym for †Digitolabrum elegans, an extinct species (Aporrhaidae) from the Eocene of Egypt

Clade Neogastropoda

- Cancellaria elegans, a synonym for Merica elegans, the elegant nutmeg, a sea snail (Cancellariidae) found off the Philippines, Indonesia, western Thailand and Queensland
- Coronium elegans, a sea snail (Muricidae) found off the southeastern coast of Brazil
- Cryptospira elegans, a sea snail (Marginellidae) found in Asia

Superfamily Buccinoidea

- Cantharus elegans, a true whelk (Buccinidae) found in Panama and Mexico
- Columbella elegans, a synonym for Cotonopsis turrita, a sea snail (Columbellidae) found in western America

Clade Neogastropoda, superfamily Conoidea

- Cochlespira elegans, a sea snail (Cochlespiridae) found in the Caribbean Sea, the Gulf of Mexico and the Greater Antilles
- Comitas elegans, a sea snail (Turridae)

Family Conidae

- Conasprella elegans (syn. Conus elegans G. B. Sowerby III, 1895), a sea snail found from Somalia to Pakistan and off Western Australia
- Conus elegans Schepman, 1913, a synonym for Conasprella comatosa, a sea snail found in the Pacific Ocean off Japan, the Philippines, northwest Australia, New Caledonia and the Solomon Islands

Family Drilliidae

- Cerodrillia elegans, a sea snail found off Espírito Santo, Brazil

Informal group Ptenoglossa, superfamily Triphoroidea

- Cerithiopsida elegans (syn. Cerithiopsis elegans), a sea snail (Newtoniellidae) found in the Kuril Islands

Clade Sorbeoconcha, superfamily Cerithioidea

- Cerithium elegans, a fossil sea snail (Cerithiidae)

Clade Heterobranchia, clade Euthyneura

- Caloria elegans, a colorful sea slug (Facelinidae) found in European waters
- Chilina elegans, an air-breathing freshwater snail (Chilinidae) found in Chile
- Chromodoris elegans, a synonym for Felimare picta, a sea slug (Chromodorididae) found throughout the Mediterranean Sea and the eastern North Atlantic Ocean
- Chrysallida elegans, a synonym for Liamorpha elegans, a sea snail (Pyramidellidae) found in the European waters
- Coenocharopa elegans, the elegant pinwheel snail, an air-breathing land snail (Charopidae) found in Queensland, Australia

Informal group Opisthobranchia

- Cyerce elegans, a sacoglossan sea slug (Caliphyllidae)

Clade Euopisthobranchia, clade Cephalaspidea
Superfamily Philinoidea

- Chelidonura elegans, a synonym for Chelidonura hirundinina, a sea slug (Aglajidae) found in the western Indo-Pacific and the Caribbean Sea

Clade Panpulmonata, clade Eupulmonata, clade Stylommatophora
Informal group Sigmurethra
Superfamily Clausilioidea

- Columbinia elegans, an air-breathing land snail (Clausiliidae) found in Peru

Superfamily Punctoidea

- †Calogoniodiscus elegans, an extinct species (Discidae) from the Tertiary

Clade Vetigastropoda

- Choristes elegans var. tenera, a synonym for Choristella tenera, a sea snail (Lepetellidae) found in the Atlantic Ocean off New Jersey and North Carolina, United States

Superfamily Seguenzioidea

- †Calliomphalus elegans, an extinct species (Calliotropidae) from the Cretaceous of Siberia

Superfamily Trochoidea

- Calliostoma elegans, a synonym for Laetifautor elegans, a sea snail (Calliostomatidae) found in Japan
- Chunula elegans, a synonym for Liotella elegans, a marine species (Skeneidae) found off the Northern Territory, Australia

==== Bivalvia (bivalves) ====
- †Caestocorbula elegans, an extinct saltwater clam from the Eocene of Belgium
- †Callista elegans, an extinct clam (Veneridae) from the Eocene of France
- Callocardia elegans, a synonym for Dosinia concentrica, the West Indian dosinia, a species of saltwater clam (Veneridae) found in Caribbean waters
- †Carbonicola elegans, an extinct species of saltwater clams (Anthracosiidae) that lived during the Carboniferous period of the United Kingdom
- †Cavilucina elegans Fischer, 1887, an extinct species (Lucinidae) from the Lutetian of France
- Cavilucina elegans (Deshayes, 1823) or Corbis elegans, a synonym for Fimbria soverbii, a species (Fimbriidae)
- Cetoconcha elegans (syn. Cribrosoconcha elegans), a saltwater clam (Poromyidae)
- Chama elegans, Centrocardita elegans or Cardita elegans (Requien, 1848), synonyms for Centrocardita aculeata, a marine clam (Carditidae) found in the Mediterranean Sea and the European part of the North Atlantic Ocean
- †Clavagella elegans, an extinct marine species (Clavagellidae) from the Cretaceous of Algeria
- †Corbicula elegans, an extinct species of fresh and brackish water clams (Cyrenidae)
- †Corbulamella elegans (syn. Corbula elegans), an extinct clam from the Cretaceous of France
- †Crassostrea elegans (syn. †Cubitostrea elegans), an extinct species of true oysters (Ostreidae)
- †Crenella elegans, an extinct species (Mytilidae) from the Lutecian of France
- Crenatula elegans, a synonym for Crenatula picta, a marine species (Pteriidae) known from Madagascar and the Red Sea
- †Cucullaea elegans, an extinct species of false ark shells (Cucullaeidae) from the north of Germany
- Cumingia elegans, a synonym for Thyellisca lamellosa, a marine clam (Semelidae)
- Cuspidaria elegans, a species (Cuspidariidae) found in Indonesia, the Philippines and the South China Sea
- Cyclas elegans, a synonym for Sphaerium rhomboideum, the rhomboid fingernailclam, a freshwater species (Sphaeriidae) found in North America
- †Cyclocardia elegans (syn. Cardita elegans (Lamarck, 1806)), an extinct clam (Carditidae) from the Eocene of France
- †Cypricardinia elegans, an extinct species (Cardiniidae) from the Devonian of Maryland, United States

==== †Ammonoidea (ammonites) ====
- †Cancelloceras elegans, an extinct species (Gastrioceratidae) from the Carboniferous of the Russian Federation, Navada (United States) and Uzbekistan
- †Ceccaisculitoides elegans, an extinct species (Paragoceratidae) from the Triassic of Nevada
- †Cleviceras elegans, an extinct species (Hildoceratidae) from the Early Jurassic of Europe, Siberia and Canada
- †Crendonites elegans, a species from the Upper Jurassic of Greenland
- †Crioceras elegans (probable synonym of †Crioceratites elegans), an extinct species (Crioceratitidae) from the Cretaceous of Germany
- †Crioceratites elegans, an extinct species (Crioceratitidae) from the Early Cretaceous
- †Paraceratites elegans (synonym †Ceratites elegans), an extinct species from the Triassic of China and Israel

==== Nautiloidea (nautiloids) ====
- †Cymatoceras elegans, a species (Cymatoceratidae) from the Cretaceous of Switzerland and the United Kingdom

==== Aplacophora ====
- Chaetoderma elegans, a glisten worm (Chaetodermatidae) found in the eastern Pacific

==== Scaphopoda (scaphopods) ====
- Costentalina elegans, a species (Entalinidae) found in Australia and the Indian Ocean

==== Polyplacophora (chitons) ====
- Craspedochiton elegans (syn. Craspedoplax elegans), a species (Acanthochitonidae)

==== Mollusca incertae sedis (gastropods or monoplacophorans) ====
- †Conradella elegans or †Cyrtolites elegans, synonyms for †Phragmolites elegans, an extinct species (†Bucaniidae) from the Ordovician of Ohio

=== Bryozoa (bryozoans) ===
- †Callocladia elegans, an extinct species (†Crustoporidae) from the Devonian or Carboniferous of the Park City Formation in Idaho, Wyoming and Utah
- Carbasea elegans, a species (Flustridae) found in Australia
- Catenicella elegans, a species (Catenicellidae) found in New Zealand
- Characodoma elegans, a species (Cleidochasmatidae) found in the South China Sea
- Cinctipora elegans, a species (Cinctiporidae) found in New Zealand
- †Clausotrypa elegans, an extinct species (Nikiforovellidae) from the Permian of northeast China
- †Coscinium elegans, an extinct species (†Hexagonellidae) from the Paleozoic rocks of the western states and territories of the United States
- †Coscinopleura elegans, an extinct species (Coscinopleuridae) from the Paleocene of Denmark
- Crisia elegans, a species (Crisiidae) from Cape of Good Hope in South Africa
- Cupuladria elegans, a species (Cupuladriidae) from the Nansha Islands sea area
- †Cyrtopora elegans, an extinct marine species from the Cretaceous of Europe
- †Cystodictya elegans, an extinct species (†Cystodictyonidae) from the Upper Carboniferous of Oklahoma, United States

=== Brachiopoda (brachiopods) ===
- †Camarotoechia elegans, an extinct species (†Trigonirhynchiidae) from the Ordovician and Silurian of the Siberian platform
- †Caucasorhynchia elegans, an extinct species (Allorhynchidae) known from the Triassic of Slovakia
- †Chonetes elegans L.B. Smyth 1922, a synonym for †Chonetes speciosus, an extinct species (†Chonetidae) found in Ireland
- †Chonetes elegans L. G. de Koninck, 1847, a synonym for †Plicochonetes elegans, an extinct species (†Rugosochonetidae)
- †Cleiothyridina elegans, an extinct species (Athyrididae) from the Mississippian of Oklahoma
- †Craniops elegans, an extinct species (Craniopsidae) from the Ordovician of Estonia
- †Crinistrophia elegans, a synonym for †Douvillinella (Crinistrophia) elegans, an extinct species (†Douvillinidae) from the Devonian of the Czech Republic and Germany
- †Cubanothyris elegans, an extinct species (†Angustothyrididae) from the Triassic of Russian Federation
- †Cyclothyris elegans, an extinct species (†Cyclothyrididae) from the Mastrichian (Upper Cretaceous) of Belgium

=== Nemertea (nemertean worms) ===
- Cyanonemertes elegans, a marine species from Washington state, United States

=== Annelida (annelids) ===
- Chrysopetalum elegans, a synonym for Bhawania goodei, a species (Chrysopetalidae) found in tropical waters around the world
- Corephorus elegans, a synonym for Terebellides stroemii, a species (Terebellidae)

=== Rotifera (rotifers) ===
- Callidina elegans, the graceful callidina, a freshwater species (Adinetidae)
- Cephalodella elegans, a species (Notommatidae) found on Mount Desert Island, in Hancock County, Maine, United States

=== Platyhelminthes (flatworms) ===
==== Monogenea ====
- Calceostoma elegans, a synonym for Calceostoma calceostoma, a species (Calceostomatidae) parasite of the brown meagre (Sciaena umbra) in the Mediterranean

==== Rhabditophora ====
- Cicerina elegans, a species (Cicerinidae) from the bay of Great Peter of the Sea of Japan

==== Trematoda (trematodes) ====
Cercarial forms

Cercaria can be used as a genus to specify the larval form of a species. Cercaria elegans may refer to such species as Bucephalus elegans or Plagiorchis elegans or Transversotrema elegans

- Cercaria elegans (Hong Kong larval trematode) Tang, 1992 nec Mueller in La Valette, 1855, the cercarial form of a species of trematodes parasite of marine bivalves in Hong Kong, listed at Cercaria (genus)

===== Plagiorchiida =====
- Choanocotyle elegans, a species (Choanocotylidae) that infects Australian freshwater turtles

==== Turbellaria ====
- Cylindrostoma elegans, a synonym for Pseudostomum klostermanni, a marine species (Pseudostomidae) found in the Black and Mediterranean seas and in the European waters of the North Atlantic Ocean

=== Gastrotricha (gastrotrichs) ===
- Chaetonotus elegans, a species (Chaetonotidae) found in freshwaters of Europe

=== Chitinozoa (chitinozoans) ===
- †Conochitina elegans, an extinct species (Conochitinidae) of the Silurian of the Baltic Sea

== Fungi ==
=== Ascomycota (ascomycetes or sac fungi) ===
==== Arthoniomycetes ====
- Coniocarpon elegans, a synonym for Arthonia elegans, a lichen (Arthoniaceae)

==== Dothideomycetes ====
- Capnodium elegans, a synonym for Acrogenotheca elegans, a species (Capnodiaceae) found in Australia and New Zealand
- Cladosporium elegans, a plant pathogen (Davidiellaceae) found on leaves of oranges in Italy
- Chaetothyriothecium elegans, a species (Microthyriaceae) found in central Thailand
- Campsotrichum elegans, a synonym for Periconia elegans, a species (incertae sedis)
- Cheiromoniliophora elegans, a species (incertae sedis)

==== Laboulbeniomycetes ====
- Chitonomyces elegans, a species
- Corethromyces elegans, a species found on Rhexius inculptus (ant-loving beetles) in the United States
- Cryptandromyces elegans, a species found in the Netherlands
- Cucujomyces elegans, a species found in Argentina

==== Lecanoromycetes ====
- Caloplaca elegans or Callopisma elegans, synonyms for Xanthoria elegans, a species of lichenized fungi (Teloschistaceae) with a circumpolar and alpine distribution
- Coccocarpia elegans, a species of lichenized fungi (Coccocarpiaceae) found in Brazil

==== Leotiomycetes ====
- Cornularia elegans, a species (Dermateaceae) found in Italy

==== Orbiliomycetes ====
- Candelabrella elegans, a synonym for Arthrobotrys elegans, a species (Orbiliaceae) found on dung

==== Sordariomycetes ====
- Canalisporium elegans, a lignicolous species (incertae sedis) found in Malaysia
- Chaetosphaeria elegans, a species (Chaetosphaeriaceae)
- Cytospora elegans, a species (Valsaceae)
- Ceratopodium elegans, a species (Microascaceae)
- Chalara elegans, a synonym for Thielaviopsis basicola, a plant pathogen (Ceratocystidaceae)
- Cladobotryum elegans, a species
- Cephalodiplosporium elegans, a species
- Corallomycetella elegans (syn. Corallomyces elegans), a parasite of the rubber, tea and cacao trees
- Cylindrocladiella elegans, a species

==== Ascomycota incertae sedis ====
- Catenospegazzinia elegans, a species found in Western Australia
- Cephalosporium elegans, a synonym for Botryosporium pulchrum, a plant pathogen that causes leaf mold in geraniums
- Ceratosporella elegans, a synonym for Ceratosporella bicornis, a species
- Corethropsis elegans, a species found in association with the sugarcane in Argentina
- Corynesporina elegans, a species

=== Basidiomycota (basidiomycetes) ===
==== Agaricomycetes ====
- Calcarisporium elegans a species (Catathelasmataceae) known from São Tomé and Príncipe
- Clitocybe elegans, a synonym for Armillaria heimii, a species (Physalacriaceae) that causes root rot on tea trees in eastern Africa
- Collybia elegans a synonym for Marasmius elegans, the velvet parachute, a species (Marasmiaceae) found in eucalypt forests in Australia
- Conocybe elegans, a species (Bolbitiaceae) found in Denmark
- Cortinarius elegans, a species (Cortinariaceae)
- Cyathus elegans, a synonym for Cyathus stercoreus, the dung-loving bird's nest, a species (Nidulariaceae)
- Cystodermella elegans (syn. Cystoderma elegans), a species (Agaricaceae) found in the Congo
- Cyphella elegans (syn. Chaetocypha elegans), a species (Cyphellaceae), possibly an unavailable name
- Coniophora elegans, a species (Coniophoraceae)
- Cricunopus elegans, a synonym for Suillus grevillei, Greville's bolete or larch bolete, a species (Suillaceae) found in Europe and Asia
- Cantharellus elegans Saut., 1841, a mushroom, possibly an unavailable name
- Craterellus elegans, a species
- Clavaria elegans, a synonym for Clavulina cristata, a species
- Caromyxa elegans, Caryomyxa elegans or Corynites elegans, synonyms for Mutinus elegans, the elegant stinkhorn, the dog stinkhorn, the headless stinkhorn or the devil's dipstick, a species (Phallaceae) found in Japan, Europe and eastern North America
- Colus elegans, a synonym for Pseudocolus fusiformis, the stinky squid, a species (Phallaceae) found in the United States, Australia, Japan, Java and the Philippines
- Cantharellus elegans Berk. & Broome, 1875, a synonym for Merulius berkeleyi, a species (Meruliaceae)
- Cymatoderma elegans (syn. Cladoderris elegans), a species (Meruliaceae) found in Indonesia

==== Cystobasidiomycetes ====
- Cyrenella elegans, a fungus (order incertae sedis)

==== Pucciniomycetes ====
- Caeoma elegans, a species (not yet assigned to a family)
- Caeomurus elegans or Coeomurus elegans, synonyms for Uromyces elegans, a species (Pucciniaceae)

=== Blastocladiomycota ===
- Coelomomyces elegans, a species (Coelomomycetaceae) found on Culex gelidus in Sri Lanka

=== Chytridiomycota ===
- Chytridium elegans, a species (Chytridiaceae)
- Chytriomyces elegans, a saprophytic species (Chytriomycetaceae)
- Cladochytrium elegans, a synonym for Nowakowskiella elegans, a species (Cladochytriaceae)

=== Mucoromycota ===
- Chaetocladium elegans, a species
- Chaetostylum elegans , a synonym for Helicostylum elegans, a species
- Cunninghamella elegans, a species found in soil and also used as a model of mammalian xenobiotics metabolism

== Archaeplastida ==
=== Rhodophyta (red algae) ===
==== Stylonematophyceae ====
- Callonema elegans, a synonym for Stylonema alsidii (Stylonemataceae), a marine species with a worldwide distribution

==== Florideophyceae ====
- Calocladia elegans, a synonym for Delisea elegans, a species (Bonnemaisoniaceae)
- Callithamnion elegans, a synonym for Gymnothamnion elegans, a species (Wrangeliaceae) found in South Africa
- Capraella elegans, a synonym for Martensia elegans, a species (Delesseriaceae) found in South Africa
- Ceramium elegans or Conferva elegans, synonyms for Ceramium diaphanum var. elegans, a red alga (Ceramiaceae)
- Colaconema elegans, a marine species (Colaconemataceae) found in Korea, California and Brazil
- Chondracanthus elegans, a red alga (Gigartinaceae)
- Claudea elegans, a marine species (Delesseriaceae) found in tropical waters in Australia, India, Pakistan and Brazil
- Cruoriella elegans, a species (Peyssonneliaceae) found in the southern islands of Japan

==== Rhodophyceae ====
- Cheilosporum elegans, a synonym for Jania cultrata, a species (Corallinoideae)
- Corallina elegans, a species (Corallinoideae) from the Mediterranean Sea and the North Atlantic Ocean
- Corallina elegans Lenormand ex Areschoug, 1852, a synonym for Jania rubens var. corniculata, a subspecies (Corallinoideae)

=== Green algae ===
==== Chlorophyta (chlorophytes) ====
- Chaetophora elegans, a species (Chaetophoraceae)
- Chara elegans, a species (Characeae)
- Chlorosarcina elegans, a terrestrial species (Chlorosarcinaceae)
- Cladophora elegans f. major, a synonym for Cladophora vagabunda, a marine species (Cladophoraceae) with a worldwide distribution
- Chlamydobotrys elegans, a synonym for Pyrobotrys elegans, a species (Spondylomoraceae)
- Chlamydomonas elegans, a freshwater species (Chlamydomonadaceae)
- Chlorogonium elegans, a species (Haematococcaceae)

==== Charophyta (charophytes) ====
- Closterium elegans, a synonym for Closterium setaceum, a species (Closteriaceae) with a worldwide distribution
- Cosmarium elegans, a synonym for Cosmarium tetragonum var. elegans, a subspecies (Desmidiaceae)
- Conjugata elegans, a species (Zygnemataceae)

=== Non-vascular plants ===
==== Marchantiophyta (liverworts) ====
- Cephaloziella elegans (syn. Cephalozia elegans), a species (Cephaloziellaceae) found in the Russian Federation
- Ceramanus elegans, a leafy liverwort (Lepidoziaceae) found in New Zealand
- Cololejeunea elegans, a species (Lejeuneaceae) found in Cameroon

==== Bryophyta (mosses) ====
- Chaetomitrium elegans, a species (Symphyodontaceae)
- Cleistostoma elegans, a synonym for Dendropogonella rufescens, a species (Cryphaeaceae) found in South America

=== Tracheophyta (vascular plants) ===
==== Division Pteridophyta (ferns), class Pteridopsida (leptosporangiate ferns) ====
===== Order Polypodiales (or Athyriales) =====
- Cyclosorus elegans, a species (Thelypteridaceae) found in China

==== Unranked Spermatophyta (spermatophytes), division Cycadophyta, class Cycadopsida (cycads) ====
===== Order and family unknown =====
- †Cycadophyllum elegans, an extinct species from the Triassic of Germany

==== Spermatophytes, division †Pteridospermatophyta (seed ferns) ====
===== Order †Medullosales =====
Family †Cyclopteridaceae

- †Cyclopteris elegans Lesquereux, 1854, an extinct species from the Carboniferous of Pennsylvania, United States
- †Cyclopteris elegans Unger, 1856
- †Cyclopteris elegans Achepohl, 1883, an extinct species from Westphalia, Germany

==== Spermatophytes, basal angiosperms ====
===== Order Nymphaeales =====
- Castalia elegans, a synonym for Nymphaea elegans, the tropical royalblue water-lily, an aquatic plant (Nymphaeaceae) found in Louisiana, Florida and Texas in the United States, in Oaxaca in Mexico and in Antioquia in Colombia

==== Spermatophytes, angiosperms (flowering plants), dicotyledons ====
===== Eudicots, asterids, order Asterales =====
Family Asteraceae

Subfamily Asteroideae

- Calea elegans, a synonym for Perymenium acuminatum, a species (Heliantheae) found in Mexico
- Calostelma elegans, a synonym for Liatris elegans, the pinkscale gayfeather, pinkscale blazingstar or elegant blazingstar, a species (Eupatorieae) native to the southeastern United States
- Calycadenia elegans, a synonym for Calycadenia pauciflora, the smallflower western rosinweed, a species (Madieae) found in California
- Chaetopappa elegans, a synonym for Ionactis elegans, the Sierra Blanca least-daisy, a species (Astereae) found only in New Mexico in the western United States
- Chevreulia elegans, a synonym for Chevreulia acuminata, a species (Gnaphalieae) found in South America
- Chrysothamnus elegans, a synonym for Chrysothamnus viscidiflorus subsp. lanceolatus, the yellow rabbitbrush or green rabbitbrush, a species (Astereae) found in North America
- Coreopsis elegans or Calliopsis elegans, two synonyms for Coreopsis tinctoria, the plains coreopsis, a species (Coreopsideae) common to much of the United States
- Crassina elegans, a synonym for Zinnia elegans, a species (Heliantheae) native to Mexico

Subfamily Carduoideae

- Centaurea elegans, a synonym for Centaurea cineraria, the velvet centaurea, a species (Cynareae) found in Italy
- Cousinia elegans, a synonym for Cousinia multiloba, a species (Cynareae) found in Afghanistan

Subfamily Cichorioideae

- Cacalia elegans, a synonym for Lessingianthus elegans, a species (Vernonieae) found in Bolivia
- Crepis elegans, a synonym for Askellia elegans, the elegant hawksbeard, a species (Cichorieae) found in North America

Subfamily Mutisioideae

- Chaetanthera elegans, a species (Mutisieae) found in Chile
- Clarionea elegans, a synonym for Perezia magellanica, a species (Nassauvieae) found in Argentina and Chile

Family Campanulaceae

- Campanula elegans, a species (Campanuloideae)
- Clintonia elegans, a synonym for Downingia elegans, the elegant calicoflower or Californian lobelia, a species (Lobelioideae) native to western North America from California to British Columbia

===== Eudicots, asterids, order Lamiales =====
- Caldenbachia elegans, a synonym for Stenandrium pohlii, Portuguese names caiapiá or carapiá, a species (Acanthaceae) native to the Cerrado and Pantanal vegetation of Brazil
- Callitriche elegans, a synonym for Callitriche palustris, the spiny water starwort, a species of aquatic plants (Plantaginaceae)
- Castilleja elegans, the elegant Indian paintbrush, a herbaceous plant (Orobanchaceae) found in Canada
- Chionanthus elegans, a synonym for Chionanthus crassifolius, a species (Oleaceae) found in Brazil
- Citharexylum elegans, a synonym for Rhaphithamnus venustus, the Juan Bueno, a species (Verbenaceae) endemic to the Juan Fernández Islands, an archipelago west of Chile
- Clytostoma elegans, synonym of Bignonia noterophila

Family Gesneriaceae

- Chirita elegans, a synonym for Primulina swinglei, a species found in China and Vietnam
- Codonanthe elegans, a species found in Belize
- Columnea elegans, a synonym for Columnea minor, a species found in Ecuador
- Cyrtandra elegans, a species found in Indonesia and Papua New Guinea

Family Lamiaceae

- Callicarpa elegans, synonym of Callicarpa micrantha, a species found in the Philippines
- Colquhounia elegans, a shrub found in Asia
- Condea elegans, a species (Nepetoideae) found in South America

===== Eudicots, asterids, order Gentianales =====
Family Apocynaceae

- Capuronetta elegans, a synonym for Tabernaemontana capuronii, a species (Rauvolfioideae) found in Madagascar
- Centrostemma elegans or Cyrtoceras elegans, synonyms for Hoya celebica, a species (Asclepiadoideae) found in Indonesia
- Ceropegia elegans, a species found in India and Sri Lanka
- Conopharyngia elegans, a synonym for Tabernaemontana elegans, the toad tree, a species (Rauvolfioideae) found eastern Africa
- Cryptolepis elegans, a synonym for Cryptolepis sinensis, a species
- Cynanchum elegans, the white-flowered wax plant, a species found in New South Wales in Australia

Family Rubiaceae

- Cleisocratera elegans, a synonym for Saprosma elegans, a species (Rubioidea) found in Indonesia
- Condaminea elegans, a species found in Peru
- Coprosma elegans, a species found in New Guinea

===== Eudicots, asterids, order Solanales =====
Nightshades (family Solanaceae)

- Calibrachoa elegans, a plant found in Minas Gerais in Brazil
- Cestrum elegans, the purple cestrum, a plant (Cestroideae)

Family Convolvulaceae

- Convolvulus elegans, a synonym for Bonamia elegans, a plant found in Myanmar
- Cuscuta elegans, a synonym for Cuscuta babylonica var. elegans, a species found in Iraq and Turkmenistan

===== Eudicots, asterids, order Apiales =====
Family Apiaceae

- Carum elegans, a synonym for Bunium elegans, a species (Apioideae, Pyramidoptereae) found in Syria
- Chaerophyllum elegans, a species (Apioideae, Scandiceae, Scandicinae) found in the Alps from Switzerland, France and Italy
- Cryptotaenia elegans, also known in Spanish as perejil de Monteverde (parsley of Monteverde), a species (Apioideae, Oenantheae) endemic to the Canary Islands

===== Eudicots, asterids, order Ericales =====
- Chrysophyllum elegans Raunk. ex Warm., a synonym for Chrysophyllum flexuosum, a tree (Sapotaceae) found in Brazil
- Chrysophyllum elegans (Vink) Baehni, a synonym for Pycnandra decandra subsp. coriacea, a tree (Sapotaceae) found in New Caledonia
- Cleyera elegans, a synonym for Freziera undulata, a species (Pentaphylacaceae) found in the Caribbean
- Cyclamen elegans, a plant (Primulaceae) found in northern Iran and southeastern Azerbaijan

===== Eudicots, rosids, order Celastrales =====
- †Celastrinites elegans, an extinct species (Celastraceae) from the Eocene Florissant fossil bed of Colorado

===== Eudicots, rosids, order Malvales =====
Family Cistaceae

- Cistus elegans, a synonym for Cistus salviifolius, the sage-leaved rock-rose, salvia cistus or Gallipoli rose, a species native to the Mediterranean region, in southern Europe and parts of western Asia and North Africa

Family Malvaceae

- Callianthe elegans, a plant (Malveae) found in Brazil
- Cola elegans, a species of trees (Sterculioideae) found in Gabon
- Cristaria elegans, a plant native to Chile

===== Eudicots, rosids, order Myrtales =====
Family Myrtaceae

- Calyptranthes elegans, a species found in the Lesser Antilles
- Calyptromyrcia elegans, a synonym for Myrcia guianensis, the pedra-ume-caá, a species (Myrtoideae) found in South America
- Carpolepis elegans, a synonym for Metrosideros elegans, a tree endemic to New Caledonia
- Caryophyllus elegans, a synonym for Syzygium elegans, a species found in New Caledonia

Family Melastomataceae

- Carionia elegans, a species
- Clidemia elegans, a synonym for Clidemia hirta, the soapbush or Koster's curse, an invasive species found in many tropical regions of the world

Other families

- Clarkia elegans, a synonym for Clarkia unguiculata, the elegant clarkia, a species (Onagraceae) found in California
- Combretum elegans, a synonym for Combretum rotundifolium, the monkey brush, a species (Combretaceae) found in South America
- Crypteronia elegans, a tree (Crypteroniaceae) found in Sarawak
- Cuphea elegans, a species (Lythraceae) native to Brazil

===== Eudicots, rosids, order Fabales =====
Family Fabaceae (legumes)

- Calliandra elegans, a species (Mimosoideae) found in Brazil
- Callisemaea elegans, a species found in Mesoamerica
- Cassia elegans, a synonym for Senna septemtrionalis, the arsenic bush, a species (Caesalpinioideae)
- Cavaraea elegans, a synonym for Tamarindus indica, the tamarind, a species (Detarioideae) indigenous to tropical Africa
- Chamaefistula elegans, a synonym for Senna obliqua, a species (Caesalpinioideae, Cassieae) found in Peru
- Chesneya elegans, a species (Faboideae) found in Turkey
- Chorizema elegans, a synonym for Chorizema varium, a species (Faboideae) found in Australia
- Coronilla elegans, a synonym for Securigera elegans, a species
- Crotalaria elegans, a synonym for Crotalaria peduncularis, a species (Faboideae, Crotalarieae) found in India
- Cryptosepalum elegans, a species (Caesalpinioideae) found in Angola
- Ctenodon elegans, a species (Fabaceae) found in Brazil

===== Eudicots, rosids, order Fagales =====
Family Casuarinaceae

- Casuarina elegans, a synonym for Allocasuarina littoralis, the black sheoak, black she-oak or river black-oak, a species endemic to Australia

===== Eudicots, rosids, order Malpighiales =====
Family Salicaceae

- Casearia elegans, a synonym for Casearia bartlettii, a species found in Belize and Guatemala

Family Euphorbiaceae

- Chamaesyce elegans, a synonym for Euphorbia elegans, a species (Euphorbioideae)
- Claoxylon elegans, a synonym for Claoxylon longifolium, a species (Acalyphoideae) found in Assam, Southeast Asia, New Guinea and Caroline Islands

Crotonoids (subfamily Crotonoideae)

- Codiaeum elegans, a synonym for Codiaeum variegatum, the garden croton or variegated croton, a plant (Codiaeae) native to Indonesia, Malaysia, Australia and the western Pacific Ocean islands
- Croton elegans, a synonym of Croton ferrugineus, a shrub (Crotoneae) native to western South America and northern Brazil

Family Calophyllaceae

- Calophyllum elegans, a tropical tree found in Asia
- Clusiella elegans, a species found in Colombia

===== Eudicots, rosids, order Brassicales =====
- Capparis elegans (syn. Capparidastrum elegans), a species (Capparaceae) found in Brazil
- Corynandra elegans, the elegant spider-flower, a species (Cleomaceae) found in the Konkan region of Maharashtra, India

Family Brassicaceae (crucifers)

- Capsella elegans, a synonym for Capsella bursa-pastoris, the shepherd's purse, a species native to eastern Europe and Asia Minor but naturalized elsewhere
- Chorispora elegans or Chorispermum elegans, synonyms for Chorispora sabulosa, a species found in China and Pakistan
- Clypeola elegans, a species found in Turkey

===== Eudicots, rosids, order Rosales =====
Family Rhamnaceae

- Ceanothus elegans, a synonym for Ceanothus thyrsiflorus, the blueblossom or blue blossom ceanothus, a species endemic to California

Family Rosaceae

- Chabertia elegans, a species
- Coluria elegans, a synonym for Coluria longifolia, a species (Rosoideae) found in China
- Cotoneaster elegans, a species (Amygdaloideae) found in China
- Crataegus elegans, a synonym for Crataegus monogyna, the common hawthorn or single-seeded hawthorn, a species (Amygdaloideae) native to Europe, northwest Africa and western Asia

===== Eudicots, rosids, order Sapindales =====
Family Burseraceae

- Canarium elegans, a species found in Madagascar

Family Rutaceae

- Conchocarpus elegans (syn. Cusparia elegans), a species found in Brazil

Family Sapindaceae

- Cardiospermum elegans, a synonym for Cardiospermum grandiflorum, the balloon vine, heart pea or heart seed, a climbing plant found in Argentina and Brazil
- Cupania elegans, a horticultural name (a name that has never been validly published in scientific literature) for a species (Sapindoideae)

===== Eudicots, rosids, order Geraniales =====
Family Geraniaceae

- Campylia elegans, a synonym for Pelargonium elegans, a species found in South Africa

Family Vivianiaceae

- Cissarobryon elegans, a species

===== Eudicots, rosids, order Vitales =====
Family Vitaceae

- Cissus elegans, a species

===== Eudicots, rosids, order Cucurbitales =====
Family Begoniaceae

- Casparya elegans, a synonym for Begonia foliosa, a species found in Colombia and Venezuela

Family Cucurbitaceae

- Corallocarpus elegans, a species (Cucurbitoideae) found in Africa
- Cyclanthera elegans, a synonym for Cyclanthera tenuisepala, a species found in Costa Rica

===== Eudicots, order Ranunculales =====
Family Menispermaceae

- Cocculus elegans, a synonym for Cocculus orbiculatus, the queen coralbead, a woody vine found from India east to Java
- Cyclea elegans, a species found in Sumatra, Malaya, Borneo

Family Papaveraceae

- Corydalis elegans (syn. Capnoides elegans), a species (Fumarioideae) found in India, China and the western Himalayas

Family Ranunculaceae

- Cheiropsis elegans, a synonym for Clematis cirrhosa, a species (Ranunculoideae)

===== Eudicots, core eudicots, order Caryophyllales =====
- Calandrinia elegans E.Vilm. – a synonym of Cistanthe grandiflora (Lindl.) Schltdl. (Montiaceae)
- Calandrinia elegans Spach – a synonym of Calandrinia ciliata (Ruiz & Pav.) DC. (Montiaceae)
- Calligonum elegans, a plant (Polygonaceae) found in Uzbekistan
- Cerastium elegans, a synonym for Cerastium cerastoides, a plant (Caryophyllaceae) found in mountain regions of Europe
- Conophytum elegans, a succulent plant (Aizoaceae)

Family Cactaceae (cacti)

- Cactus elegans Link, a synonym for Disocactus phyllanthoides, a species (Cactoideae, Hylocereeae) native to Mesoamerica
- Cactus elegans (DC.) Kuntze, a synonym for Mammillaria elegans, a species (Cactoideae, Cacteae) native to Mexico
- Cereus elegans, a cactus (Cactoideae, Cereeae)

===== Eudicots, core eudicots, order Santalales =====
- Comandra elegans, a synonym for Comandra umbellata, the bastard toadflax, umbellate bastard toadflax or common comandra, a species found in North America and the Mediterranean

===== Eudicots, core eudicots, order Saxifragales =====
- Crassula elegans, the elegant crassula, a plant (Crassulaceae)

===== Magnoliids, order Laurales =====
Family Lauraceae

- Cinnamomum elegans, a species found in Samoa
- Cryptocarya elegans, a species

==== Flowering plants, monocotyledons ====
===== Commelinids, order Arecales =====
Family Arecaceae (palms)

- Calamus elegans, a species (Calamoideae)
- Calyptrocalyx elegans, a species (Arecoideae) found in Papua New Guinea and the nearby Maluku Islands
- Caryota elegans, a species (Coryphoideae, Caryoteae)
- Chamaedorea elegans (syn. Collinia elegans), the neanthe bella palm or parlour palm, a species (Arecoideae, Hyophorbeae) native to the rainforests in southern Mexico and Guatemala
- Chamaerops elegans, a synonym for Chamaerops humilis, the European fan palm or the Mediterranean dwarf palm, a cold-hardy species (Coryphoideae, Trachycarpeae) used in landscaping in temperate climates
- Coccothrinax elegans, a species (Coryphoideae) found in Cuba
- Cyphophoenix elegans, a species found only in New Caledonia
- Cyrtostachys elegans, a species (Arecoideae) endemic to New Guinea

Family Dasypogonaceae

- Calectasia elegans, the elegant tinsel lily, a species found in Western Australia

===== Commelinids, order Poales =====
Family Cyperaceae (sedges)

- Carex elegans, a synonym for Carex limosa, the mud sedge and shore sedge, a species found across North America and Eurasia
- Cyperus elegans, the royal flatsedge, a species from Central and South America

Family Eriocaulaceae

- Comanthera elegans, a species found in Minas Gerais, Brazil

Family Poaceae (bamboos and grasses)
Subfamily Chloridoideae

- Calotheria elegans, a synonym for Enneapogon elegans, a species (Eragrostideae) found in Myanmar and Tamil Nadu, India
- Chloris elegans, a synonym for Chloris virgata, the feather fingergrass or feather windmill grass, a species native to many of the warmer temperate, subtropical and tropical regions of the world
- Ctenium elegans (syn. Campulosus elegans), a species found from Senegal to the Sudan

Subfamily Panicoideae

- Callichloea elegans, a synonym for Elionurus elegans, a species (Andropogoneae) found in Nigeria and Senegal
- Cenchrus elegans, a species (Paniceae) found in Malesia
- Ceresia elegans, a synonym for Paspalum ceresia, a species found in South America
- Cymbopogon elegans, a species

Subfamily Pooideae (cool-season grasses)

- Calamagrostis elegans, a synonym for Calamagrostis eminens, a species (Poeae, Agrostidinae) found in South America
- Calotheca elegans or Chascolytrum elegans, synonyms for Calotheca brizoides, a species (Poeae, Calothecinae) found in Buenos Aires, Uruguay, Rio Grande do Sul and Biobio
- Cynosurus elegans (syn. Chrysurus elegans), a species (Poeae, Cynosurinae) found in southern Europe, northern Africa, Middle East and Turkmenistan

Subfamily Bambusoideae (bamboos)

- Chusquea elegans, a species (Bambuseae) found in Paraná, Brazil

===== Commelinids, order Commelinales =====
Family Commelinaceae

- Callisia elegans, a synonym for Callisia gentlei var. elegans, a subspecies (Commelinoideae) found in Oaxaca, Chiapas, Guatemala and Honduras
- Commelina elegans, a synonym for Commelina erecta, the white mouth dayflower or slender dayflower, a perennial herb native throughout the Americas, Africa and western Asia

===== Commelinids, order Zingiberales =====
- Calathea elegans, a plant (Marantaceae) found in Colombia and Panama
- Canna elegans, a synonym for Canna glauca, a species (Cannaceae) from the wetlands of tropical America
- Costus elegans, a synonym for Costus malortieanus, a species (Costaceae) found in Costa Rica, Nicaragua and Honduras

===== Order Asparagales =====
Family Amaryllidaceae

- Crinum elegans, a synonym for Crinum lorifolium, a species (Amaryllidoideae) found in India and Myanmar

Family Asparagaceae

- Caloscilla elegans, a synonym for Scilla peruviana, the Portuguese squill, a species (Scilloideae) native to the western Mediterranean region in Iberia, Italy and northwest Africa

Family Iridaceae

- Crocus elegans, a species (Crocoideae) found in Turkey
- Cypella elegans, a herbaceous plant found in Argentina

Family Orchidaceae (orchids)
Subfamily Orchidoideae (orchidoid orchids)

- Caladenia elegans (syn. Calonema elegans or Calonemorchis elegans), the elegant spider-orchid, a species found in Western Australia
- Chloraea elegans, a species found in Argentine
- Cyclopogon elegans, a species found in Brazil and Argentina
- Cynorkis elegans, a species found in Madagascar

Subfamily Epidendroideae (epidendroid orchids)

- Cattleya elegans, a synonym for Cattleya × elegans, a hybrid (Epidendreae, Laeliinae) found in Brazil
- Cestichis elegans, a synonym for Liparis elegans, a species (Malaxideae) found in Southeast Asia (Indonesia, Papua New Guinea)
- Cirrhopetalum elegans, an epiphytic species (Dendrobieae, Bulbophyllinae) found in Malaya
- Cleisostoma elegans, a synonym for Cleisostoma williamsoni, Williamson's cleisostom, a species (Vandeae) found in Asia
- Crocodeilanthe elegans, a synonym of Stelis roseopunctata
- Cymbidium elegans (syn. Cyperorchis elegans), a species (Cymbidieae) found in southwestern China
- Crepidium elegans, a species (Malaxideae) found in Malesia
- Cyrtopodium elegans, a synonym for Tetramicra canaliculata, a species (Epidendreae, Laeliinae) found in Florida, Hispaniola, Puerto Rico, Trinidad and the Lesser Antilles
- Cephalanthera elegans, a synonym for Cephalanthera erecta, a species (Neottieae, Limodorinae) found in China, Japan, Korea, Kuril Islands, Bhutan, Assam and eastern Himalayas

Subfamily Cypripedioideae (lady's-slippers)

- Cypripedium elegans (syn. Coelogyne elegans), a species found in Nepal and China

===== Order Liliales =====
Family Liliaceae

- Calochortus elegans (synonym Cyclobothra elegans (Pursh) Benth.), the elegant mariposa lily or cat's ear, a plant found in the western United States from northern California to Montana
- Cyclobothra elegans Torr., a synonym for Calochortus coeruleus, the beavertail grass or blue star tulip, a species endemic to California

===== Order Pandanales =====
Family Cyclanthaceae

- Carludovica elegans, a species found in Peru

==== Vascular plants, division Pteridophyta (ferns), class Polypodiopsida ====
===== Order Hymenophyllales =====
- Cephalomanes elegans, a filmy fern (Hymenophyllaceae)

===== Order Polypodiales (polypod ferns) =====
- Callipteris elegans, a synonym for Diplazium fraxinifolium, a species (Athyriaceae) found in Asia
- Cheilanthes elegans, a synonym for Cheilanthes myriophylla, the Central American lace fern, a species (Pteridaceae) native as far south as Argentina
- Colysis elegans, a species (Polypodiaceae) found in China

==== Vascular plants, division Pteridophyta (ferns), class Pteridopsida ====
===== Order Cyatheales (tree ferns) =====
- Cyathea elegans, a synonym for Cyathea grevilleana, a species (Cyatheaceae) found in Jamaica

==== Vascular plants, division Pinophyta (conifers) ====
===== Class Pinopsida, order Pinales =====
Family Cupressaceae

- †Cunninghamites elegans (syn. Cunninghamia elegans), an extinct species from the Late Cretaceous of Europe
- Callitris elegans, a species (Callitroideae) described from Australia

Family Pinaceae

- Cedrus elegans, a synonym for Cedrus libani, the cedar of Lebanon or Lebanon cedar, a species native to the mountains of the eastern Mediterranean basin

==== Plants awaiting allocation ====
- †Circulisporites elegans, a species known from Triassic spores and pollen grains

== SAR supergroup ==
=== Rhizaria ===
==== Foraminifera ====
- Cassidulina elegans, a synonym for Globocassidulina elegans, a marine species (Cassidulinidae) found in the Japanese and New Zealand exclusive economic zones
- †Cibicides elegans, an extinct species (Cibicididae) from the Tertiary of the Dominican Republic
- Cibusoides elegans, a benthonic species (Heterolepidae) from the Pacific Ocean
- †Cyclammina elegans, an extinct species (Cyclamminidae) from the Cretaceous of Trinidad and from New Zealand
- †Cuneolina elegans, an extinct species (†Cuneolinidae) from the Lower Paleogene of Austria
- †Clavulina elegans, a synonym for †Arenodosaria antipodum, an extinct species (Eggerellidae) known from the Miocene of New Zealand
- †Cristellaria elegans, an extinct species (Peneroplidae)

==== Radiozoa (radiolarians) ====
- Clathrocyclas elegans, a species (Theoperidae)
- †Cornutanna elegans, an extinct species from the Miocene of Italy
- †Cana elegans, an extinct species (†Pantanelliidae) from the Cretaceous of northwest Turkey
- †Cenellipsis elegans, a species (incertae sedis) from the Paleocene of western Kuban
- Cromyatractus elegans, a species (incertae sedis) from the northwestern Pacific Ocean

==== Cercozoa ====
- Clathrulina elegans, a heliozoan species (Clathrulinidae) found in freshwater environments
- Castanidium elegans, a species (Castanellidae) found in the Sargasso Sea and in the current around the Canary Islands

=== Alveolata (alveolates) ===
==== Ciliophora (ciliates) ====
- Chromidina elegans, a species (Opalinopsidae) parasite of the cuttlefish Sepia elegans described from Naples, Italy
- Cryptochilum elegans, a synonym for Uronema elegans, a species (Uronematidae) found in Norway
- Cothurnia elegans, a species of peritrichs (Vaginicolidae) found in Australia
- Cavichona elegans, a species (Spirochonidae)

==== Dinoflagellata (dinoflagellates) ====
- Centrodinium elegans, a synonym for Oxytoxum elegans, a species (Oxytoxaceae) found in the Gulf of Mexico, the Lebanese exclusive economic zone waters and the North Atlantic Ocean
- Corythodinium elegans, a species (Oxytoxaceae) with a worldwide distribution
- Ceratium elegans Schröder, 1906, a synonym for Tripos elegans, a species (Ceratiaceae)
- †Clathroctenocystis elegans, an extinct species (Microdiniaceae) from the Cretaceous of Alaska, United States
- †Cleistosphaeridium elegans, a synonym for †Impletosphaeridium elegans, an extinct species (incertae sedis) from the Early Tertiary
- Cymbodinium elegans, a marine species (Kofoidiniaceae)

=== Stramenopiles (heterokonts) ===
==== Xanthophyceae (yellow-green algae) ====
- Characiopsis elegans, a freshwater species (Characiopsidaceae) described from Arkansas, North America, and Brazil, South America

==== Chrysophyceae (golden-brown algae) ====
- Chromulina elegans, a freshwater species (Chromulinaceae) found in Europe, South America and Asia
- Chrysococcus elegans (syn. Chrysococcocystis elegans), a freshwater species (Dinobryaceae) found in North America

==== Bacillariophyceae (diatoms) ====
- Chaetoceros elegans, a species (Chaetocerotaceae) found in Taiwan
- Cocconeis elegans, a species (Cocconeidaceae) found in Sicily
- Cymbella elegans, a species (Cymbellaceae)
- Campylodiscus elegans, a species (Surirellaceae)
- Climacosphenia elegans, a marine pennate species (Climacospheniaceae)
- †Cladogramma elegans, an extinct species from the scientific voyage of HMS Challenger
- Cladomphalus elegans, a species from California
- †Corinna elegans, an extinct species from the Cretaceous of Canada
- †Cosmiodiscus elegans, an extinct species
- †Craspedoporus elegans, an extinct marine species from a deposit from Oamaru, Otago, New Zealand

===== Coscinodiscophyceae =====
- Coscinodiscus elegans, a species found in the Gulf of Mexico
- Craspedodiscus elegans, a species

== Other eukaryotes ==
=== Amoebozoa ===
- Centropyxiella elegans, a species of family Centropyxidae found in the European waters of the North Atlantic Ocean
- Collaria elegans (syn. Comatricha elegans), a species of family Stemonitidaceae
- Cribraria elegans, a slime mold of family Cribrariaceae found in the United States, Europe and Japan
- Calospeira elegans, a slime mold (Dictyosteliales incertae sedis)

=== Choanoflagellata ===
- Cladospongia elegans, a species found in India
- Codonosiga elegans, a species

=== Haptophyta (haptophytes) ===
- Chrysochromulina elegans, a species (Prymnesiaceae) found in Baltic Sea in Europe and in Brazil in South America

=== Cryptophyta (cryptomonads or cryptophytes) ===
- Chroomonas elegans, a species (Chroomonadaceae) found in Lake Neusiedl, at the Austria-Hungarian border
- Cryptaulax elegans, a species (Cryptomonadaceae) found in tropical marine sediments

=== Acritarcha (acritarchs) ===
- †Cheleutochroa elegans, an extinct species from the Ordovician of Estonia
- †Coryphidium elegans, an extinct species from the Tremadocian, the lower age of the Ordovocian, of Morocco

== Bacteria ==
- Cyanonephron elegans, a freshwater species (Synechococcaceae) described in the Netherlands, Russia and Australia

== Domain incertae sedis ==
- †Clonophycus elegans, an extinct species of microalgae found in the Barney Creek Formation of the Middle Proterozoic of northern Australia

== Species names sorted in alphabetical order ==
- Cacalia elegans
- Cacia elegans
- Cacogamia elegans
- Cacopsylla elegans
- Cacozelia elegans
- Cactus elegans
- Cacyparis elegans
- Caecilius elegans
- Caecum elegans
- Caelopygus elegans
- Caelostomus elegans
- Caenorhabditis elegans
- Caenotherium elegans
- Caenura elegans
- Caeoma elegans
- Caeomurus elegans
- Caestocorbula elegans
- Cainotherium elegans
- Caladenia elegans
- Calamagrostis elegans
- Calamaria elegans
- Calamophylliopsis elegans
- Calamus elegans
- Calandra elegans
- Calandrinia elegans
- Calanus elegans
- Calaphidius elegans
- Calathea elegans
- Calcarisporium elegans
- Calceolispongia elegans
- Calceostoma elegans
- Calcinus elegans
- Caldenbachia elegans
- Calea elegans
- Calectasia elegans
- Caledonomorpha elegans
- Caledothele elegans
- Calephorus elegans
- Caliapora elegans
- Calibrachoa elegans
- Caligulus elegans
- Caligus elegans
- Caliris elegans
- Callhistia elegans
- Callianassa elegans
- Calliandra elegans
- Callianthe elegans
- Calliaster elegans
- Callibracon elegans
- Callicarpa elegans
- Callicella elegans
- Callichloea elegans
- Callichroma elegans
- Callidemum elegans
- Calliderma elegans
- Callidina elegans
- Callienispia elegans
- Calligonum elegans
- Calligrapha elegans
- Callimormus elegans
- Callinethis elegans
- Calliomphalus elegans
- Callionima elegans
- Callionymus elegans
- Calliopsis elegans
- Calliostoma elegans
- Callipepla elegans
- Calliprason elegans
- Callipteris elegans
- Callipterus elegans
- Calliscelio elegans
- Callisemaea elegans
- Callisia elegans
- Callispa elegans
- Callista elegans
- Callisthenes elegans
- Callistocythere elegans
- Callistola elegans
- Callistomimus elegans
- Callistrophia elegans
- Calliteara elegans
- Callithamnion elegans
- Callitriche elegans
- Callitris elegans
- Callizonus elegans
- Callocardia elegans
- Callocladia elegans
- Callocossus elegans
- Callogorgia elegans
- Callograptus elegans
- Callomyia elegans
- Callonema elegans
- Callopisma elegans
- Callopisma elegans
- Callotillus elegans
- Callyspongia elegans
- Calocalanus elegans
- Calocheiridius elegans
- Calochortus elegans
- Calocitta elegans
- Calocladia elegans
- Calodromas elegans
- Calofulcinia elegans
- Calogoniodiscus elegans
- Calohilara elegans
- Calolampra elegans
- Calonema elegans
- Calonemorchis elegans
- Calopezus elegans
- Calophyllum elegans
- Caloplaca elegans
- Calopotosia elegans
- Calopteryx elegans
- Caloria elegans
- Caloscilla elegans
- Calosoma elegans
- Calospeira elegans
- Calosphaera elegans
- Calostelma elegans
- Caloteleia elegans
- Calotheca elegans
- Calotheria elegans
- Calycadenia elegans
- Calyptoproctus elegans
- Calyptranthes elegans
- Calyptrocalyx elegans
- Calyptromyrcia elegans
- Camallanus elegans
- Camarotoechia elegans
- Cambraster elegans
- Cambridgea elegans
- Camillina elegans
- Campanula elegans
- Campanulotes elegans
- Camphotherium elegans
- Campodorus elegans
- Camponotus elegans
- Campoplex elegans
- Campsotrichum elegans
- Campterophlebia elegans
- Campulosus elegans
- Campylia elegans
- Campylodiscus elegans
- Campyloneurus elegans
- Cana elegans
- Canalisporium elegans
- Canarium elegans
- Cancellaria elegans
- Cancelloceras elegans
- Cancricepon elegans
- Candelabrella elegans
- Canna elegans
- Cantharellus elegans
- Cantharus elegans
- Canthon elegans
- Capnodium elegans
- Capnoides elegans
- Capparidastrum elegans
- Capparis elegans
- Capraella elegans
- Caprellinoides elegans
- Capromys elegans
- Capsella elegans
- Capsodes elegans
- Capula elegans
- Capulus elegans
- Capuronetta elegans
- Caputoraptor elegans
- Carbasea elegans
- Carbonicola elegans
- Carcharias elegans
- Cardiacephala elegans
- Cardiaphyllum elegans
- Cardiastethus elegans
- Cardiocondyla elegans
- Cardioglossa elegans
- Cardiophorus elegans
- Cardiorhinus elegans
- Cardiospermum elegans
- Cardiosyne elegans
- Cardita elegans
- Carenum elegans
- Carex elegans
- Carinostoma elegans
- Carinthiaphyllum elegans
- Carionia elegans
- Carludovica elegans
- Caromyxa elegans
- Carphurus elegans
- Carpolepis elegans
- Carteriospongia elegans
- Cartodere elegans
- Carum elegans
- Carvalhodrymus elegans
- Caryanda elegans
- Caryanda elegans
- Caryomyxa elegans
- Caryophyllus elegans
- Caryota elegans
- Casearia elegans
- Casparya elegans
- Casphalia elegans
- Cassia elegans
- Cassidulina elegans
- Castalia elegans
- Castanidium elegans
- Castilleja elegans
- Casuarina elegans
- Catalabus elegans
- Catalebeda elegans
- Catalina elegans
- Cataloipus elegans
- Catantops elegans
- Catapaecilma elegans
- Catascopus elegans
- Catenicella elegans
- Catenipora elegans
- Catenospegazzinia elegans
- Catharesthes elegans
- Catopygus elegans
- Cattleya elegans
- Caucasorhynchia elegans
- Caulophacus elegans
- Caulospongia elegans
- Caupolicana elegans
- Cautires elegans
- Cavaraea elegans
- Cavernularia elegans
- Cavichona elegans
- Cavilucina elegans
- Cayluxotherium elegans
- Ceanothus elegans
- Ceccaisculitoides elegans
- Cecidocharella elegans
- Cecidomyia elegans
- Cedrus elegans
- Celastrinites elegans
- Celeus elegans
- Cenchrus elegans
- Cenellipsis elegans
- Cenomyce elegans
- Centaurea elegans
- Centridermichthys elegans
- Centrinaspis elegans
- Centris elegans
- Centrocardita elegans
- Centrocerum elegans
- Centrodinium elegans
- Centropages elegans
- Centrophthalmus elegans
- Centropyxiella elegans
- Centrostemma elegans
- Centruroides elegans
- Centrurus elegans
- Cephalanthera elegans
- Cephalaspis elegans
- Cephalochetus elegans
- Cephalodella elegans
- Cephalodiplosporium elegans
- Cephalomanes elegans
- Cephaloplatus elegans
- Cephalosporium elegans
- Cephalostenus elegans
- Cephalota elegans
- Cephalozia elegans
- Cephaloziella elegans
- Cepon elegans
- Cerachalcis elegans
- Ceraeochrysa elegans
- Ceramanus elegans
- Cerambix elegans
- Cerambyx elegans
- Ceramium elegans
- Cerapachys elegans
- Ceraspis elegans
- Cerastium elegans
- Ceratites elegans
- Ceratium elegans
- Ceratodus elegans
- Ceratomyxa elegans
- Ceratopodium elegans
- Ceratosporella elegans
- Cercaria elegans
- Cerceris elegans
- Cercinthus elegans
- Cerdistus elegans
- Cereatta elegans
- Ceresia elegans
- Cereus elegans
- Cerithiopsida elegans
- Cerithiopsis elegans
- Cerithium elegans
- Cerobates elegans
- Cerodrillia elegans
- Ceropales elegans
- Ceropegia elegans
- Ceroplesis elegans
- Cesonia elegans
- Cestichis elegans
- Cestrotus elegans
- Cestrum elegans
- Cethegus elegans
- Cetoconcha elegans
- Cetonia elegans
- Ceuthophilus elegans
- Ceutorhynchus elegans
- Chabertia elegans
- Chaenon elegans
- Chaerocampa elegans
- Chaerodrys elegans
- Chaerophyllum elegans
- Chaetanthera elegans
- Chaetoceros elegans
- Chaetocladium elegans
- Chaetocypha elegans
- Chaetoderma elegans
- Chaetomitrium elegans
- Chaetonotus elegans
- Chaetopappa elegans
- Chaetophora elegans
- Chaetosphaeria elegans
- Chaetospila elegans
- Chaetostylum elegans
- Chaetothyriothecium elegans
- Chalara elegans
- Chalarostylis elegans
- Chalcogenia elegans
- Chalcoscirtus elegans
- Chalcosyrphus elegans
- Chalinissa elegans
- Chalinodendron elegans
- Chalinopsilla elegans
- Chama elegans
- Chamaedorea elegans
- Chamaefistula elegans
- Chamaemyia elegans
- Chamaerops elegans
- Chamaesyce elegans
- Championa elegans
- Chandleria elegans
- Chapra elegans
- Chara elegans
- Characiopsis elegans
- Characodoma elegans
- Charadrius elegans
- Chariaster elegans
- Chariessa elegans
- Chariesthes elegans
- Chascolytrum elegans
- Chatterjeea elegans
- Cheilanthes elegans
- Cheiloneurus elegans
- Cheilosporum elegans
- Cheilotomona elegans
- Cheiracanthium elegans
- Cheiromoniliophora elegans
- Cheiropsis elegans
- Cheleutochroa elegans
- Chelidonura elegans
- Chelifer elegans
- Chelisia elegans
- Chelisoches elegans
- Chelonus elegans
- Chenopus elegans
- Chersine elegans
- Chersotis elegans
- Chesneya elegans
- Chevreulia elegans
- Chilenchus elegans
- Chilina elegans
- Chiliospora elegans
- Chiloneus elegans
- Chionanthus elegans
- Chiridota elegans
- Chirita elegans
- Chirodota elegans
- Chironomus elegans
- Chirostenotes elegans
- Chitaura elegans
- Chitonomyces elegans
- Chlaenius elegans
- Chlamydobotrys elegans
- Chlamydomonas elegans
- Chlamydotheca elegans
- Chloraea elegans
- Chloris elegans
- Chlorizeina elegans
- Chlorogonium elegans
- Chlorolestes elegans
- Chloromastax elegans
- Chloropsina elegans
- Chlorosarcina elegans
- Chlorostilbon elegans
- Choanocotyle elegans
- Choeridium elegans
- Choetospila elegans
- Choilodon elegans
- Chomatodus elegans
- Chondracanthus elegans
- Chondria elegans
- Chonetes elegans
- Choniognathus elegans
- Chorisastrea elegans
- Chorispermum elegans
- Chorispora elegans
- Choristes elegans
- Chorizema elegans
- Chorizocarpa elegans
- Chortoicetes elegans
- Chromatopterum elegans
- Chromidina elegans
- Chromodoris elegans
- Chromulina elegans
- Chronogaster elegans
- Chroomonas elegans
- Chrysallida elegans
- Chrysemys elegans
- Chrysis elegans
- Chrysochernes elegans
- Chrysochloris elegans
- Chrysochroa elegans
- Chrysochromulina elegans
- Chrysococcocystis elegans
- Chrysococcus elegans
- Chrysogaster elegans
- Chrysogorgia elegans
- Chrysolampus elegans
- Chrysoliocola elegans
- Chrysomela elegans
- Chrysopetalum elegans
- Chrysophyllum elegans
- Chrysopidia elegans
- Chrysopilus elegans
- Chrysopophthorus elegans
- Chrysothamnus elegans
- Chrysotoxum elegans
- Chrysotus elegans
- Chrysso elegans
- Chrysurus elegans
- Chunula elegans
- Chusquea elegans
- Chyliza elegans
- Chytonix elegans
- Chytridium elegans
- Chytriomyces elegans
- Cibicides elegans
- Cibusoides elegans
- Cicerina elegans
- Cicerocrinus elegans
- Cicindela elegans
- Cidaris elegans
- Cidarites elegans
- Cimex elegans
- Cimmerites elegans
- Cinctipora elegans
- Cingula elegans
- Cinnamomum elegans
- Circobotys elegans
- Circulisporites elegans
- Cirrhopetalum elegans
- Cissarobryon elegans
- Cissus elegans
- Cistus elegans
- Citellus elegans
- Citharexylum elegans
- Cladobotryum elegans
- Cladochalina elegans
- Cladochytrium elegans
- Cladoderris elegans
- Cladodus elegans
- Cladognathus elegans
- Cladogramma elegans
- Cladomphalus elegans
- Cladophora elegans
- Cladoselache elegans
- Cladospongia elegans
- Cladosporium elegans
- Clanoptilus elegans
- Claoxylon elegans
- Clarionea elegans
- Clarkia elegans
- Clarkometra elegans
- Clathria elegans
- Clathrissa elegans
- Clathroctenocystis elegans
- Clathrocyclas elegans
- Clathrulina elegans
- Claudea elegans
- Clausotrypa elegans
- Clavagella elegans
- Clavaria elegans
- Clavelina elegans
- Clavulina elegans
- Cleiothyridina elegans
- Cleisocratera elegans
- Cleisostoma elegans
- Cleistosphaeridium elegans
- Cleistostoma elegans
- Clema elegans
- Cleonymus elegans
- Cleopus elegans
- Cleora elegans
- Cleptes elegans
- Cleviceras elegans
- Cleyera elegans
- Clianella elegans
- Clidemia elegans
- Climacosphenia elegans
- Clinocephalus elegans
- Clintonia elegans
- Clinus elegans
- Clitocybe elegans
- Clivina elegans
- Cloacina elegans
- Clonia elegans
- Clonophycus elegans
- Clossiana elegans
- Closterium elegans
- Closterocoris elegans
- Clusiella elegans
- Clypeola elegans
- Clytus elegans
- Cneorane elegans
- Cnephalocotes elegans
- Cnesinus elegans
- Cobalopsis elegans
- Cobitis elegans
- Coccocarpia elegans
- Cocconeis elegans
- Coccothrinax elegans
- Cocculus elegans
- Cochlespira elegans
- Cochlostoma elegans
- Cochylimorpha elegans
- Codiaeum elegans
- Codonanthe elegans
- Codonosiga elegans
- Codonosmilia elegans
- Coelacanthus elegans
- Coelinidea elegans
- Coelinius elegans
- Coelogyne elegans
- Coelomomyces elegans
- Coelopleurus elegans
- Coeloria elegans
- Coenites elegans
- Coenocalpe elegans
- Coenocharopa elegans
- Coenosia elegans
- Coenura elegans
- Coeomurus elegans
- Cola elegans
- Colaconema elegans
- Coleonyx elegans
- Coleophora elegans
- Coleoxestia elegans
- Colias elegans
- Collaria elegans
- Collemopsidium elegans
- Colletes elegans
- Collinia elegans
- Colliuris elegans
- Collocheres elegans
- Collybia elegans
- Collyris elegans
- Colobaspis elegans
- Cololejeunea elegans
- Colopalpus elegans
- Colpocraspeda elegans
- Colpodes elegans
- Colpophyllia elegans
- Colposcelis elegans
- Colposcenia elegans
- Colpostigma elegans
- Colquhounia elegans
- Coluber elegans
- Columbella elegans
- Columbinia elegans
- Columnea elegans
- Coluria elegans
- Colus elegans
- Colymbetes elegans
- Colysis elegans
- Comandra elegans
- Comanthera elegans
- Comatricha elegans
- Combretum elegans
- Comitas elegans
- Commelina elegans
- Commius elegans
- Comophyllia elegans
- Comphotherium elegans
- Compsocerocoris elegans
- Compsoctenus elegans
- Compsocus elegans
- Compsopsectra elegans
- Compsoscorpius elegans
- Compsus elegans
- Comptonia elegans
- Conasprella elegans
- Conchocarpus elegans
- Conchoecia elegans
- Condaminea elegans
- Condea elegans
- Conferva elegans
- Congestheriella elegans
- Coniatus elegans
- Coniocarpon elegans
- Coniophora elegans
- Conioscinella elegans
- Conistra elegans
- Conjugata elegans
- Conocephalites elegans
- Conochitina elegans
- Conocybe elegans
- Conoderus elegans
- Conomyrma elegans
- Conopharyngia elegans
- Conophytum elegans
- Conops elegans
- Conosmilia elegans
- Conotrachelus elegans
- Conradella elegans
- Consobrinomia elegans
- Constantia elegans
- Conus elegans
- Convoluta elegans
- Convolvulus elegans
- Coprosma elegans
- Coptaspis elegans
- Coptoclavella elegans
- Coptocycla elegans
- Coptodryas elegans
- Coptomia elegans
- Coptorhynchus elegans
- Coptosoma elegans
- Corallina elegans
- Corallocarpus elegans
- Corallomyces elegans
- Corallomycetella elegans
- Coranus elegans
- Corbicula elegans
- Corbis elegans
- Corbitella elegans
- Corbula elegans
- Corbulamella elegans
- Cordulecerus elegans
- Cordylocera elegans
- Cordylomera elegans
- Coregonus elegans
- Coreopsis elegans
- Coreopsomela elegans
- Corephorus elegans
- Corethromyces elegans
- Corethropsis elegans
- Coreus elegans
- Corinna elegans
- Corixa elegans
- Cormocephalus elegans
- Cornufer elegans
- Cornularia elegans
- Cornutanna elegans
- Coronella elegans
- Coronilla elegans
- Coronium elegans
- Coronocephalus elegans
- Correbia elegans
- Correbidia elegans
- Cortinarius elegans
- Corydalis elegans
- Corydia elegans
- Corydoras elegans
- Corydorus elegans
- Corymbites elegans
- Corynandra elegans
- Corynesporina elegans
- Corynites elegans
- Corynomalus elegans
- Corynoptera elegans
- Coryphaena elegans
- Coryphidium elegans
- Coryphocera elegans
- Corythodinium elegans
- Corythucha elegans
- Coscinium elegans
- Coscinodiscus elegans
- Coscinopleura elegans
- Cosmacanthus elegans
- Cosmarium elegans
- Cosmiodiscus elegans
- Cosmocoma elegans
- Cosmoderes elegans
- Cosmodes elegans
- Cosmosoma elegans
- Costentalina elegans
- Costonia elegans
- Costria elegans
- Costus elegans
- Cothurnia elegans
- Cotoneaster elegans
- Coturnicops elegans
- Cousinia elegans
- Crambus elegans
- Craniella elegans
- Craniops elegans
- Craspedocephalus elegans
- Craspedochiton elegans
- Craspedodiscus elegans
- Craspedonema elegans
- Craspedophorus elegans
- Craspedoplax elegans
- Craspedopoma elegans
- Craspedoporus elegans
- Crassina elegans
- Crassolabium elegans
- Crassostrea elegans
- Crassula elegans
- Crataegus elegans
- Craterellus elegans
- Cratocentrus elegans
- Crella elegans
- Crematogaster elegans
- Crenatula elegans
- Crendonites elegans
- Crenella elegans
- Crenicara elegans
- Crenicichla elegans
- Creniphilus elegans
- Creoleon elegans
- Crepidium elegans
- Crepis elegans
- Cretapsyche elegans
- Cribella elegans
- Cribraria elegans
- Cribrella elegans
- Cribrosoconcha elegans
- Cribrospongia elegans
- Cricosaurus elegans
- Cricotopus elegans
- Cricunopus elegans
- Crinistrophia elegans
- Crinum elegans
- Crioceras elegans
- Crioceratites elegans
- Criodion elegans
- Crisia elegans
- Cristaria elegans
- Cristellaria elegans
- Crocisa elegans
- Crocodeilanthe elegans
- Crocus elegans
- Cromna elegans
- Cromyatractus elegans
- Crosita elegans
- Crossocheilus elegans
- Crotalaria elegans
- Croton elegans, synonym of Croton ferrugineus
- Cruoriella elegans
- Cryptandromyces elegans
- Cryptanuridimorpha elegans
- Cryptarcha elegans
- Cryptaulax elegans
- Crypteronia elegans
- Cryptobium elegans
- Cryptocarya elegans
- Cryptocatantops elegans
- Cryptocheilus elegans
- Cryptocheiridium elegans
- Cryptochile elegans
- Cryptochilum elegans
- Cryptoditha elegans
- Cryptographis elegans
- Cryptolaria elegans
- Cryptolepis elegans
- Cryptomeigenia elegans
- Cryptopygus elegans
- Cryptorhynchus elegans
- Cryptosepalum elegans
- Cryptospira elegans
- Cryptotaenia elegans
- Ctenacanthus elegans
- Ctenelmis elegans
- Ctenicera elegans
- Ctenium elegans
- Ctenochasma elegans
- Ctenophora elegans
- Cuapetes elegans
- Cubanocheiridium elegans
- Cubanohydracarus elegans
- Cubanothyris elegans
- Cubitostrea elegans
- Cucujomyces elegans
- Cucullaea elegans
- Cucullanus elegans
- Culeolus elegans
- Culex elegans
- Cumingia elegans
- Cuneolina elegans
- Cunninghamella elegans
- Cunninghamia elegans
- Cunninghamites elegans
- Cupania elegans
- Cuphea elegans
- Cupuladria elegans
- Cupulospongia elegans
- Curculio elegans
- Curimata elegans
- Curimatus elegans
- Cursoria elegans
- Curtognathus elegans
- Cuscuta elegans
- Cusoria elegans
- Cusparia elegans
- Cuspidaria elegans
- Cuterebra elegans
- Cyanonemertes elegans
- Cyanonephron elegans
- Cyartonema elegans
- Cyathea elegans
- Cyathophora elegans
- Cyathopodium elegans
- Cyathus elegans
- Cybiosarda elegans
- Cycadophyllum elegans
- Cyclagnostus elegans
- Cyclamen elegans
- Cyclammina elegans
- Cyclanorbis elegans
- Cyclanthera elegans
- Cyclas elegans
- Cyclaspis elegans
- Cyclea elegans
- Cyclobothra elegans
- Cyclocardia elegans
- Cyclocephala elegans
- Cyclophorus elegans
- Cyclopina elegans
- Cyclopinodes elegans
- Cyclopinoides elegans
- Cyclopogon elegans
- Cyclops elegans
- Cyclopteris elegans
- Cycloseris elegans
- Cyclosorus elegans
- Cyclostoma elegans
- Cyclostrema elegans
- Cyclostrongylus elegans
- Cyclothyris elegans
- Cyerce elegans
- Cylindrocladiella elegans
- Cylindrostoma elegans
- Cymatoceras elegans
- Cymatoderma elegans
- Cymbachus elegans
- Cymbella elegans
- Cymbidium elegans
- Cymbodinium elegans
- Cymbopogon elegans
- Cymindis elegans
- Cymodusa elegans
- Cymothoa elegans
- Cymus elegans
- Cynanchum elegans
- Cynodictis elegans
- Cynodonichthys elegans
- Cynolebias elegans
- Cynorkis elegans
- Cynosurus elegans
- Cypella elegans
- Cyperorchis elegans
- Cyperus elegans
- Cyphella elegans
- Cyphocerastis elegans
- Cypholoba elegans
- Cyphomyia elegans
- Cyphophoenix elegans
- Cypraea elegans
- Cypraedia elegans
- Cypraeovula elegans
- Cypricardinia elegans
- Cypricercus elegans
- Cyprinodon elegans
- Cypripedium elegans
- Cyptocephala elegans
- Cyrene elegans
- Cyrenella elegans
- Cyrestis elegans
- Cyriocosmus elegans
- Cyriocrates elegans
- Cyrtandra elegans
- Cyrtoceras elegans
- Cyrtolites elegans
- Cyrtonus elegans
- Cyrtopodion elegans
- Cyrtopodium elegans
- Cyrtopora elegans
- Cyrtosia elegans
- Cyrtostachys elegans
- Cyrtotrachelus elegans
- Cystoderma elegans
- Cystodermella elegans
- Cystodictya elegans
- Cystomatochilina elegans
- Cystoseira elegans
- Cythere elegans
- Cytherea elegans
- Cytherideis elegans
- Cytospora elegans

== See also ==
- C. c. elegans (disambiguation)
- C. inelegans (disambiguation)
- C. elegantissima (disambiguation) and C. elegantissimum (elegantissima-mum meaning "most elegant")
- C. elegantula (disambiguation) ("elegantula" is a diminutive form of "elegans", hence has the meaning of small and elegant)
- C. elegans elegans (disambiguation)
- Available name / Unavailable name (terms used in zoology)
- Validly published name (terms used in botany)
