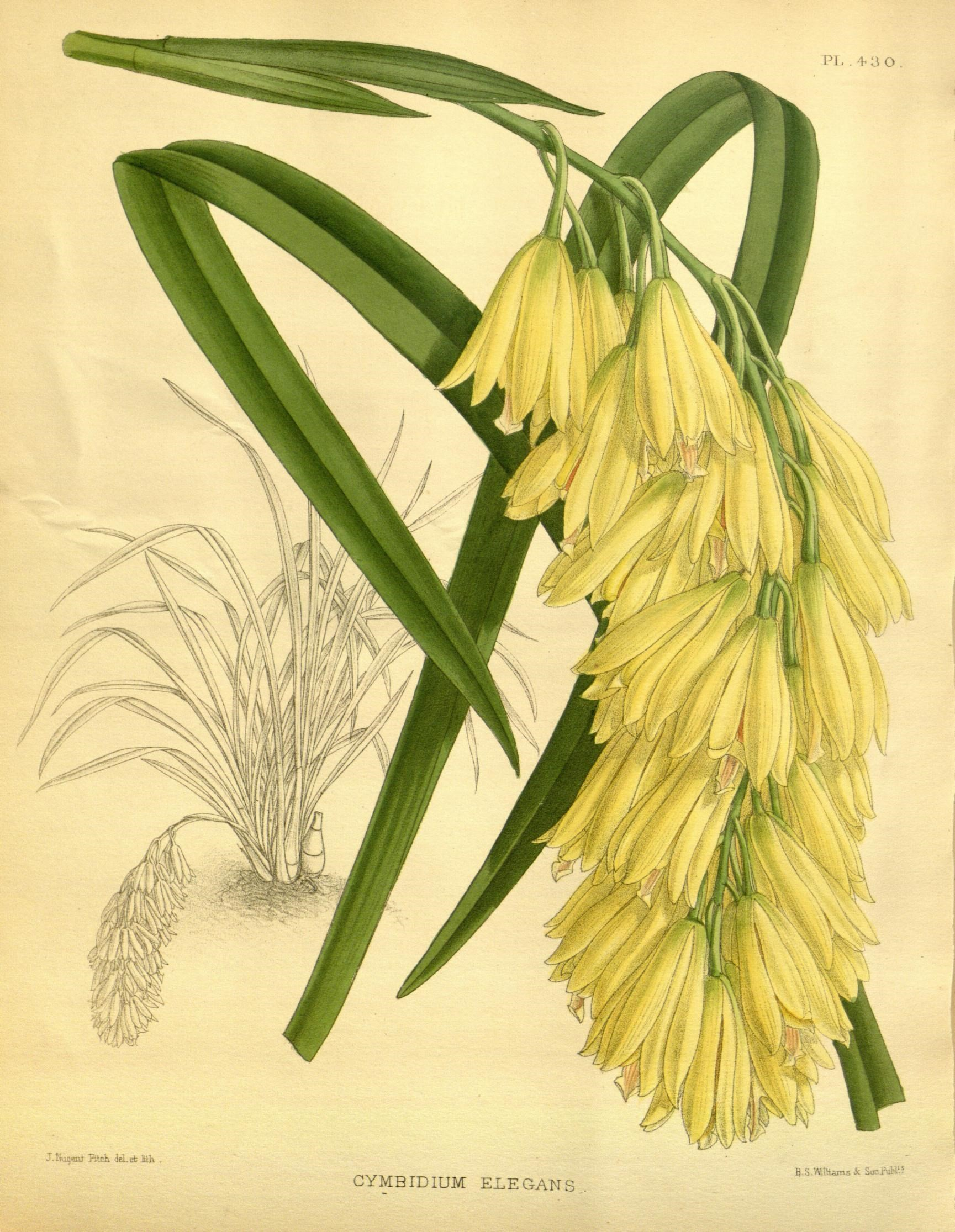

Scientific classification
- Kingdom: Plantae
- Clade: Embryophytes
- Clade: Tracheophytes
- Clade: Angiosperms
- Clade: Monocots
- Order: Asparagales
- Family: Orchidaceae
- Subfamily: Epidendroideae
- Genus: Cymbidium
- Species: C. elegans

Binomial name
- Cymbidium elegans Lindl., 1833

Varieties
- Cymbidium elegans var. elegans; Cymbidium elegans var. lushuiense (Z. J. Liu, S. C. Chen & X. C. Shi) Z. J. Liu & S. C. Chen

Synonyms
- Several, including: Cyperorchis elegans (Lindley) Blume, 1848

= Cymbidium elegans =

Species of orchid

Cymbidium elegans, the elegant cymbidium, is an orchid species in the genus Cymbidium found in South West China.
