= Colpocraspeda =

Scientific classification
- Kingdom: Animalia
- Phylum: Arthropoda
- Class: Insecta
- Order: Lepidoptera
- Family: Geometridae
- Subfamily: Ennominae
- Genus: Colpocraspeda; Warren, 1907
- Species: C. elegans

Binomial name
- Colpocraspeda elegans Warren, 1907

Genus of moths

Colpocraspeda is a monotypic moth genus in the family Geometridae. It has a single species, Colpocraspeda elegans, found in Papua New Guinea. Both the genus and species were first described by Warren in 1907
