= Cyrenella =

Scientific classification
- Kingdom: Fungi
- Division: Basidiomycota
- Class: Cystobasidiomycetes
- Order: incertae sedis
- Family: incertae sedis
- Genus: Cyrenella Goch. 1981
- Species: C. elegans

Binomial name
- Cyrenella elegans Goch. 1981

Genus of fungi

Cyrenella is a genus of fungi in the class Cystobasidiomycetes, containing the single species Cyrenella elegans.
