= Sphaerarthrum elegans =

Scientific classification
- Kingdom: Animalia
- Phylum: Arthropoda
- Clade: Pancrustacea
- Class: Insecta
- Order: Coleoptera
- Suborder: Polyphaga
- Infraorder: Elateriformia
- Family: Cantharidae
- Genus: Sphaerarthrum
- Species: S. elegans

Binomial name
- Sphaerarthrum elegans (Wittmer, 1964)

Synonyms
- Anisotelus elegans Wittmer, 1964; Cordylocera elegans (Wittmer, 1964)

Species of beetle

Sphaerarthrum elegans is a species of soldier beetle from the family Cantharidae.
