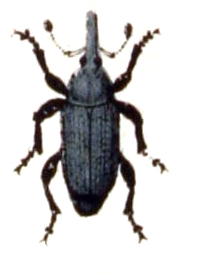
- Sphenophorus abbreviatus, from Calwer's Käferbuch, Table 34, Picture 16.

Scientific classification
- Kingdom: Animalia
- Phylum: Arthropoda
- Class: Insecta
- Order: Coleoptera
- Suborder: Polyphaga
- Infraorder: Cucujiformia
- Family: Curculionidae
- Genus: Sphenophorus
- Species: S. abbreviatus

Binomial name
- Sphenophorus abbreviatus (Fabricius, 1787)

Synonyms
- Calandra elegans (E.L.Geoffroy, 1785); Curculio elegans Fourcroy, 1785

= Sphenophorus abbreviatus =

Species of beetle

Sphenophorus abbreviatus is a true weevil species in the genus Sphenophorus.
