= Crendonites =

Crendonites Temporal range: Upper Jurassic

Scientific classification
- Kingdom: Animalia
- Phylum: Mollusca
- Class: Cephalopoda
- Subclass: †Ammonoidea
- Genus: †Crendonites; Buckman, 1923

Species
- Crendonites anguinus Spath; Crendonites elegans Spath, 1936; Crendonites gorei; Crendonites leptolobatus; Crendonites pregorei

Genus of molluscs (fossil)

Crendonites is a genus of ammonites. Species are from the Upper Jurassic.
