= Comitas elegans =

Scientific classification
- Kingdom: Animalia
- Phylum: Mollusca
- Class: Gastropoda
- Subclass: Caenogastropoda
- Order: Neogastropoda
- Superfamily: Conoidea
- Family: Pseudomelatomidae
- Genus: Comitas
- Species: C. elegans

Binomial name
- Comitas elegans Sysoev, 1996

Species of gastropod

Comitas elegans is a species of sea snail, a marine gastropod mollusc in the family Pseudomelatomidae, the turrids and allies

== Distribution ==
This marine species occurs in the Gulf of Aden.
