= Tisis elegans =

Scientific classification
- Kingdom: Animalia
- Phylum: Arthropoda
- Class: Insecta
- Order: Lepidoptera
- Family: Lecithoceridae
- Genus: Tisis
- Species: T. elegans

Binomial name
- Tisis elegans (Snellen, 1903)

Synonyms
- Cacogamia elegans Snellen, 1903

Species of moth

Tisis elegans is a moth in the family Lecithoceridae. It was described by Snellen in 1903. It is found on Java.

The wingspan is 17–19 mm.
