= Circulisporites =

Circulisporites Temporal range: Triassic

Scientific classification
- Kingdom: Plantae
- Division: incertae sedis
- Genus: Circulisporites N. J. de Jersey, 1962

Species
- Circulisporites bianularis Anderson, 1977; Circulisporites calvitium (Balme & Segroves, 1966) Anderson, 1977; Circulisporites elegans Ouyang Shu et al., 1974; Circulisporites equipolaris Li, W. & Shang, Y., 1980; Circulisporites galeoides (Segroves, 1967) Fensome et al., 1990; Circulisporites magnus Falcon, 1975; Circulisporites monilis (Balme & Segroves, 1966) Anderson, 1977; Circulisporites parvus de Jersey, 1962 emend. Norris, 1965; Circulisporites striatus Salujha, Kindra & Rehman, 1980; Circulisporites venosus (Balme & Segroves, 1966) Anderson, 1977; Circulisporites vesiculatus Gan, Z., 1986

Genus of plants

Circulisporites is an extinct genus of plants. It is known from Triassic spores and pollen grains from the Ipswich coalfield in Queensland, Australia.
