= Caryota elegans =

Scientific classification
- Kingdom: Plantae
- Clade: Tracheophytes
- Clade: Angiosperms
- Clade: Monocots
- Clade: Commelinids
- Order: Arecales
- Family: Arecaceae
- Genus: Caryota
- Species: C. elegans

Binomial name
- Caryota elegans Schaedtler, 1875

Synonyms
- Caryota elegans hort. ex H.Wendl.

Species of palm

Caryota elegans is a species of palm trees.
