= Compsoctenus =

Scientific classification
- Kingdom: Animalia
- Phylum: Arthropoda
- Class: Insecta
- Order: Coleoptera
- Suborder: Polyphaga
- Infraorder: Elateriformia
- Family: Elateridae
- Genus: Compsoctenus; Philippi, 1861

Species
- Compsoctenus elegans

Synonyms
- Comsoctenus (Golbach, 1991)

Genus of beetles

Compsoctenus is monotypic genus of click beetle, containing Compsoctenus elegans, which lives in Chile.
