= Consobrinomia =

- Life restoration

Scientific classification
- Kingdom: Animalia
- Phylum: Porifera
- Class: Calcarea
- Genus: †Consobrinomia; Termier, Termier & Vachard, 1977

Species
- Consobrinomia elegans Termier, Termier & Vachard, 1977

Extinct genus of sponges

Consobrinomia is an extinct genus of sea sponges.
