= Praepodes elegans =

Scientific classification
- Kingdom: Animalia
- Phylum: Arthropoda
- Clade: Pancrustacea
- Class: Insecta
- Order: Coleoptera
- Suborder: Polyphaga
- Infraorder: Cucujiformia
- Superfamily: Curculionoidea
- Family: Curculionidae
- Genus: Praepodes
- Species: P. elegans

Binomial name
- Praepodes elegans Guérin-Méneville, 1847

Species of beetle

Praepodes elegans is a species of weevil. It is found in Cuba.
