= Cynorkis elegans =

Scientific classification
- Kingdom: Plantae
- Clade: Tracheophytes
- Clade: Angiosperms
- Clade: Monocots
- Order: Asparagales
- Family: Orchidaceae
- Subfamily: Orchidoideae
- Genus: Cynorkis
- Species: C. elegans

Binomial name
- Cynorkis elegans Rchb.f.

Species of orchid

Cynorkis elegans is an orchid species in the genus Cynorkis found in Madagascar.
