= Calaphidius =

Scientific classification
- Kingdom: Animalia
- Phylum: Arthropoda
- Clade: Pancrustacea
- Class: Insecta
- Order: Hymenoptera
- Family: Braconidae
- Subfamily: Aphidiinae
- Tribe: Aphidiini
- Genus: Calaphidius; Mackauer, 1961
- Species: C. elegans

Binomial name
- Calaphidius elegans Mackauer, 1961

Synonyms
- Calaphidius watanabei (Takada, 1965); Monoctonus watanabei Takada, 1965

Genus of wasps

Calaphidius elegans is a species of braconid wasps in the subfamily Aphidiinae. It is the only species in the genus Calaphidius. It is found in Europe, including Germany, the Czech Republic and Finland.
