= Lessingianthus elegans =

Scientific classification
- Kingdom: Plantae
- Clade: Tracheophytes
- Clade: Angiosperms
- Clade: Eudicots
- Clade: Asterids
- Order: Asterales
- Family: Asteraceae
- Genus: Lessingianthus
- Species: L. elegans

Binomial name
- Lessingianthus elegans (Gardner) H.Rob. 1988

Synonyms
- Cacalia elegans (Gardner) Kuntze 1891; Vernonia elegans Gardner

Species of flowering plant

Lessingianthus elegans is a species of flowering plants in the family Asteraceae. It is found in Bolivia.
