= Caryanda elegans =

Caryanda elegans may refer to:

Subfamily Oxyinae

- Caryanda elegans (Bolívar, 1911), a synonym for Caryanda modesta, a grasshopper species
- Caryanda elegans Bolívar, 1918, a synonym for Caryanda neoelegans, a grasshopper species
