= Ctenicera elegans =

Scientific classification
- Kingdom: Animalia
- Phylum: Arthropoda
- Class: Insecta
- Order: Coleoptera
- Suborder: Polyphaga
- Infraorder: Elateriformia
- Family: Elateridae
- Genus: Ctenicera
- Species: C. elegans

Binomial name
- Ctenicera elegans (Kirby, 1837)

Species of beetle

Ctenicera elegans is a species of click beetles.
