= Coelinidea elegans =

Scientific classification
- Kingdom: Animalia
- Phylum: Arthropoda
- Class: Insecta
- Order: Hymenoptera
- Family: Braconidae
- Genus: Coelinidea
- Species: C. elegans

Binomial name
- Coelinidea elegans (Curtis, 1829)

Synonyms
- Chaenon elegans Curtis 1829; Coelinius elegans (Curtis, 1829)

Species of wasp

Coelinidea elegans is a wasp species in the genus Coelinidea and the family Braconidae. It is found in Europe.
