= Calamus elegans =

Scientific classification
- Kingdom: Plantae
- Clade: Tracheophytes
- Clade: Angiosperms
- Clade: Monocots
- Clade: Commelinids
- Order: Arecales
- Family: Arecaceae
- Genus: Calamus
- Species: C. elegans

Binomial name
- Calamus elegans Becc. ex Ridl., 1907

Synonyms
- Calamus elegans hort. ex H.Wendl.

Species of palm

Calamus elegans is a palm species in the genus Calamus.
