= Cosmiodiscus =

Cosmiodiscus Temporal range: 5.33–3.6 Ma

Scientific classification
- Domain: Eukaryota
- Clade: Sar
- Clade: Stramenopiles
- Division: Ochrophyta
- Clade: Bacillariophyta
- Class: Bacillariophyceae
- Order: incertae sedis
- Genus: †Cosmiodiscus; Greville, 1866

Species
- †Cosmiodiscus barbadensis Greville; †Cosmiodiscus beaufortianus Hustedt; †Cosmiodiscus elegans Greville, 1866; †Cosmiodiscus elegans var. inermis; †Cosmiodiscus insignis A.P.Jousé

Extinct genus of single-celled organisms

Cosmiodiscus is an extinct genus of diatom.
