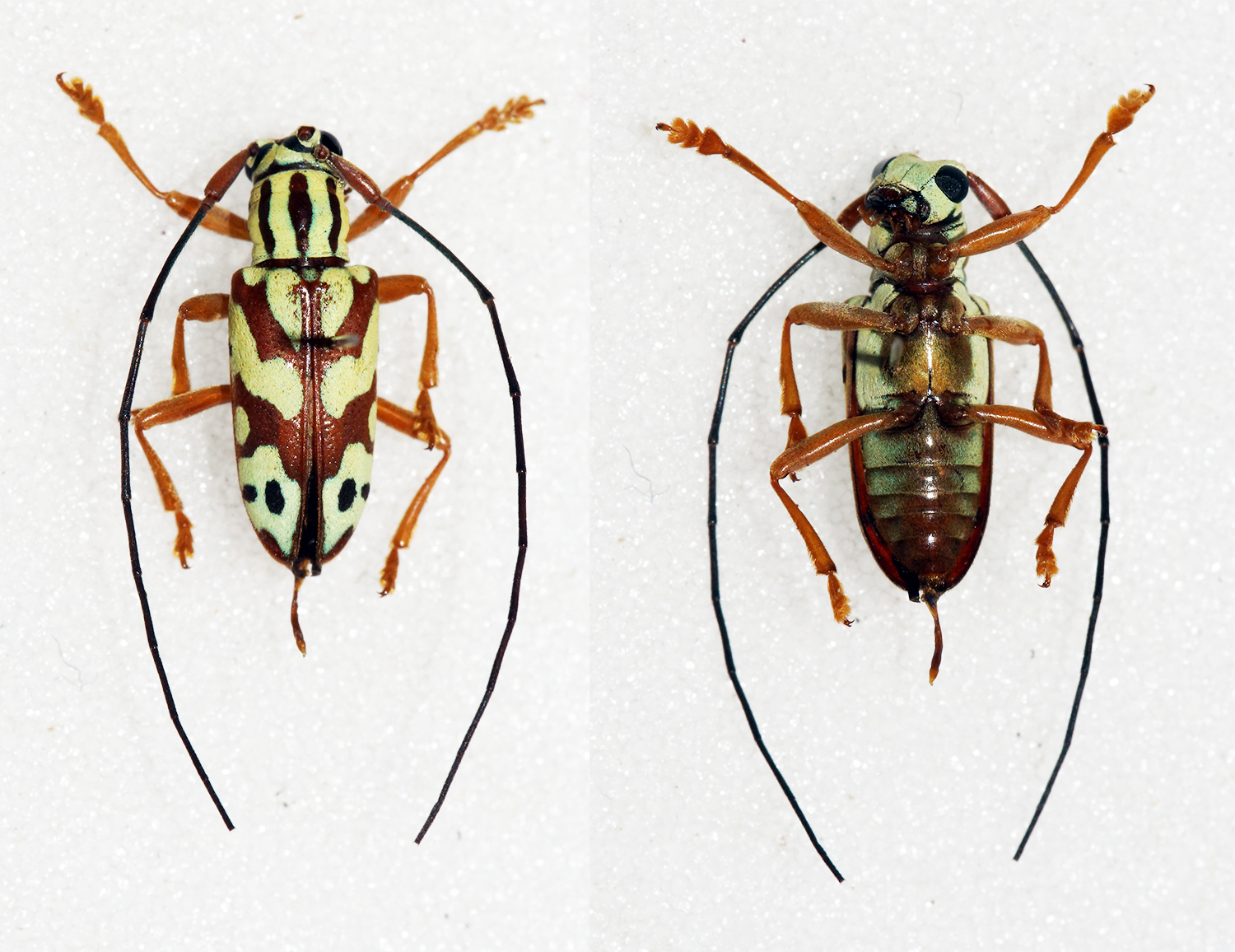

Scientific classification
- Kingdom: Animalia
- Phylum: Arthropoda
- Class: Insecta
- Order: Coleoptera
- Suborder: Polyphaga
- Infraorder: Cucujiformia
- Family: Cerambycidae
- Genus: Chariesthes
- Species: C. bella

Binomial name
- Chariesthes bella (Dalman, 1817)

Subspecies
- Chariesthes bella bella; Chariesthes bella carissima; Chariesthes bella delagoensis; Chariesthes bella gratiana; Chariesthes bella postcoerulea; Chariesthes bella rufoplagiata

Synonyms
- Chariesthes (Chariesthes) bella; Chariesthes elegans Jordan, 1894; Chariesthes aruwimia; Chariesthes laetissima; Lamia bella; Saperda carissima

= Chariesthes bella =

Species of beetle

Chariesthes bella is a species of longhorn beetles of the subfamily Lamiinae. It is found in numerous regions throughout Africa, ranging from Sierra Leone and the Ivory Coast to the forests of Uganda.
