= Cycadophyllum =

Cycadophyllum Temporal range: 242.0–235.0 Ma

Scientific classification
- Kingdom: Plantae
- Division: Cycadophyta
- Class: Cycadopsida
- Genus: †Cycadophyllum

Species
- †Cycadophyllum elegans Born., 1856

Extinct genus of cycads

Cycadophyllum is an extinct genus of cycads. It is found only at Thuringer Senke (Triassic of Germany).
