= Cubanohydracarus =

Scientific classification
- Kingdom: Animalia
- Phylum: Arthropoda
- Subphylum: Chelicerata
- Class: Arachnida
- Order: Trombidiformes
- Family: Hungarohydracaridae
- Genus: Cubanohydracarus; Orghidan & Gruia, 1980
- Species: C. elegans

Binomial name
- Cubanohydracarus elegans Orghidan & Gruia, 1980

Genus of mites

Cubanohydracarus is a genus of mites in the family Hungarohydracaridae. It is a monotypic genus containing only the species Cubanohydracarus elegans. It is found in Cuba.
