= Cenchrus elegans =

Scientific classification
- Kingdom: Plantae
- Clade: Tracheophytes
- Clade: Angiosperms
- Clade: Monocots
- Clade: Commelinids
- Order: Poales
- Family: Poaceae
- Subfamily: Panicoideae
- Genus: Cenchrus
- Species: C. elegans

Binomial name
- Cenchrus elegans (Hassk.) Veldkamp, 2014

Synonyms
- Sericura elegans Hassk. 1842; Cenchrus caninus (Reinw. ex Blume) Morrone; Gymnotrix macrostachys Brongn.; Macrochaeta sacchariformis Steud.; Pennisetum caninum Koord.; Pennisetum macrostachys (Brongn.) Trin.; Saccharum caninum Reinw. ex Blume

Species of grass

Cenchrus elegans is a species of plants in the grass family. It is found in Malesia
