= Chabertia elegans =

Scientific classification
- Kingdom: Plantae
- (unranked): Angiosperms
- (unranked): Eudicots
- (unranked): Rosids
- Order: Rosales
- Family: Rosaceae
- Genus: Chabertia
- Species: C. elegans

Binomial name
- Chabertia elegans Gand.

Species of plant

Chabertia elegans is a species of plants in the family Rosaceae. The genus Chabertia is a synonym of Rosa. As of January 2024, Plants of the World Online regarded Chabertia elegans as an unplaced name.
