= Coprosma elegans =

Scientific classification
- Kingdom: Plantae
- Clade: Tracheophytes
- Clade: Angiosperms
- Clade: Eudicots
- Clade: Asterids
- Order: Gentianales
- Family: Rubiaceae
- Genus: Coprosma
- Species: C. elegans

Binomial name
- Coprosma elegans Utteridge, 2002

Species of plant

Coprosma elegans is a flowering plant species in the genus Coprosma found in New Guinea.
