= Cardiosyne =

Cardiosyne Temporal range: 235.0–221.5 Ma

Scientific classification
- Kingdom: Animalia
- Phylum: Arthropoda
- Clade: Pancrustacea
- Class: Insecta
- Order: Coleoptera
- Suborder: incertae sedis
- Genus: †Cardiosyne; Martins-Neto & Gallego in Martins-Neto, Gallego & Mancuso, 2006

Species
- Cardiosyne elegans Martins Neto & Gallego in Martins-Neto, Gallego & Mancuso, 2006; Cardiosyne obesa Martins Neto & Gallego in Martins-Neto, Gallego & Mancuso, 2006 (type)

Genus of beetles

Cardiosyne is an extinct genus of beetles from the Triassic of Argentina. It was originally tentatively classified in Elateridae, but in 2020 it was transferred to Coleoptera incertae sedis.

== Species ==
=== Cardiosyne obesa ===
It is the type species of the genus. The type specimen is an elytron with record number PULR-I 324. Its type locality is Picos Gemelos (5th cycle), which is in a Carnian lacustrine - large claystone in the Los Rastros Formation of Argentina.

=== Cardiosyne elegans ===
The type specimen is an elytron with record number PULR-I 312. Its type locality is Rio Gualo (5th cycle), which is in a Carnian lacustrine - large claystone in the Los Rastros Formation of Argentina.
