= Cerodrillia elegans =

Scientific classification
- Kingdom: Animalia
- Phylum: Mollusca
- Class: Gastropoda
- Subclass: Caenogastropoda
- Order: Neogastropoda
- Superfamily: Conoidea
- Family: Drilliidae
- Genus: Cerodrillia
- Species: C. elegans

Binomial name
- Cerodrillia elegans Fallon, 2016

Species of gastropod

Cerodrillia elegans is a species of sea snail, a marine gastropod mollusc in the family Drilliidae.

== Description ==
The length of the shell attains 7.8 mm.

== Distribution ==
This marine species occurs off Espirito Sancto, Brazil.
