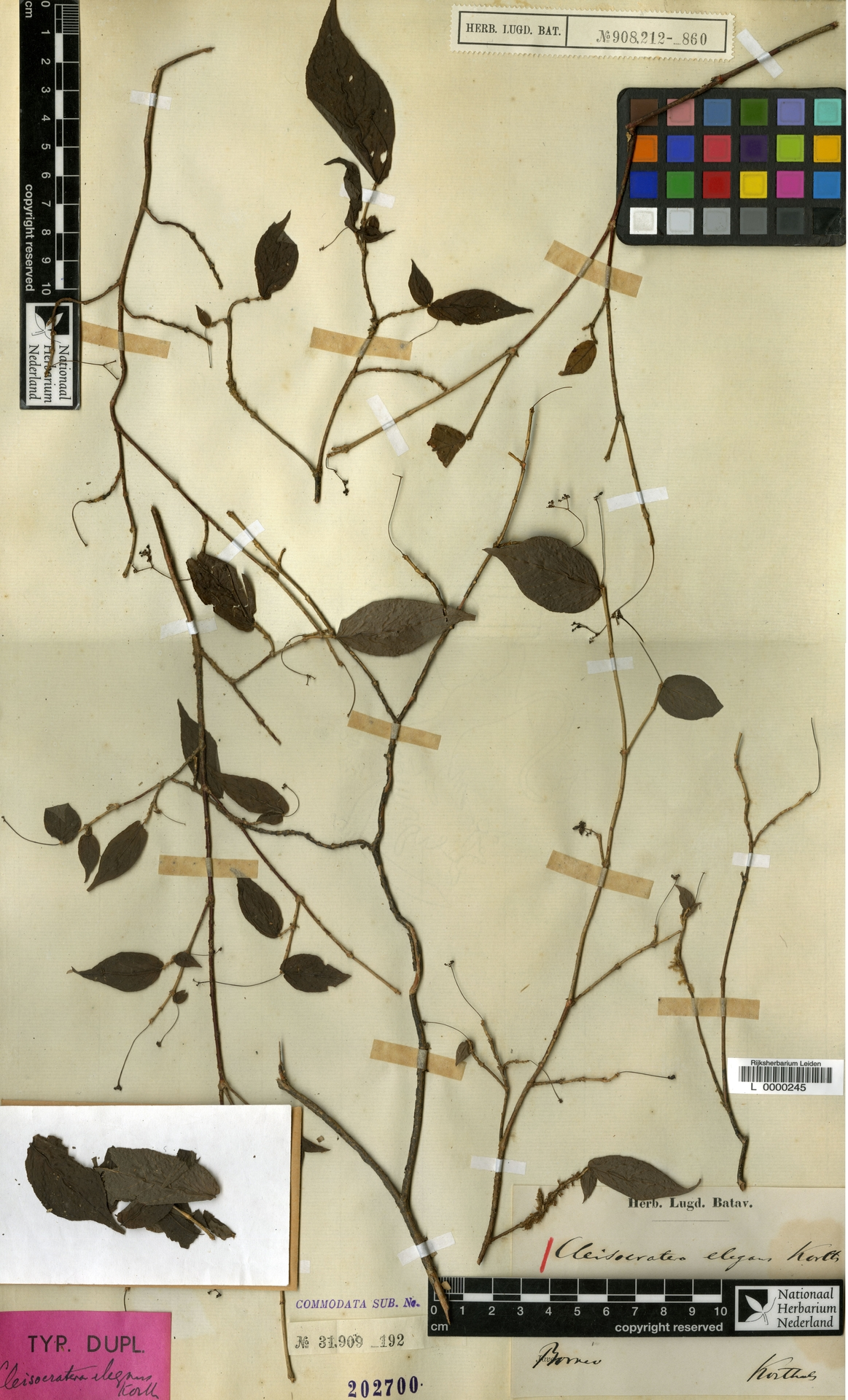

Scientific classification
- Kingdom: Plantae
- Clade: Tracheophytes
- Clade: Angiosperms
- Clade: Eudicots
- Clade: Asterids
- Order: Gentianales
- Family: Rubiaceae
- Genus: Saprosma
- Species: S. elegans

Binomial name
- Saprosma elegans (Korth.) A.P. Davis

Synonyms
- Cleisocratera elegans Korth.

= Saprosma elegans =

Species of plant

Saprosma elegans is a species of flowering plants in the family Rubiaceae. It is found in Indonesia.
