= Cacia elegans =

Scientific classification
- Kingdom: Animalia
- Phylum: Arthropoda
- Class: Insecta
- Order: Coleoptera
- Suborder: Polyphaga
- Infraorder: Cucujiformia
- Family: Cerambycidae
- Genus: Cacia
- Species: C. elegans

Binomial name
- Cacia elegans Breuning, 1939

Species of beetle

Cacia elegans is a species of longhorn beetles of the subfamily Lamiinae.
