= Championa elegans =

Scientific classification
- Kingdom: Animalia
- Phylum: Arthropoda
- Class: Insecta
- Order: Coleoptera
- Suborder: Polyphaga
- Infraorder: Cucujiformia
- Family: Cerambycidae
- Genus: Championa
- Species: C. elegans

Binomial name
- Championa elegans Chemsak, 1967

Species of beetle

Championa elegans is a species of longhorn beetles (insects in the family Cerambycidae). It was described by Chemsak in 1967. It is found in Mexico.
