= Cosmosoma elegans =

Scientific classification
- Kingdom: Animalia
- Phylum: Arthropoda
- Clade: Pancrustacea
- Class: Insecta
- Order: Lepidoptera
- Superfamily: Noctuoidea
- Family: Erebidae
- Subfamily: Arctiinae
- Genus: Cosmosoma
- Species: C. elegans

Binomial name
- Cosmosoma elegans Butler, 1876

Species of moth

Cosmosoma elegans is a species of moth of the family Erebidae. It was described by Arthur Gardiner Butler in 1876. It is found in Espírito Santo, Brazil.
