= Cryptosepalum ambamense =

Scientific classification
- Kingdom: Plantae
- Clade: Tracheophytes
- Clade: Angiosperms
- Clade: Eudicots
- Clade: Rosids
- Order: Fabales
- Family: Fabaceae
- Genus: Cryptosepalum
- Species: C. ambamense

Binomial name
- Cryptosepalum ambamense Letouzey (1984 publ. 1985)

Synonyms
- Cryptosepalum elegans Letouzey (1984), nom. illeg.

Species of legume

Cryptosepalum ambamense is a species of flowering plants in the family the Fabaceae. It is a tree endemic to Cameroon.
