= List of Plectris species =

This is a list of 362 species in Plectris, a genus of May beetles and junebugs in the family Scarabaeidae.

== Plectris species ==
- Plectris abdominalis Frey, 1967^{c g}
- Plectris aberrans Frey, 1964^{c g}
- Plectris abnormalis (Moser, 1919)^{c g}
- Plectris acreensis Frey, 1973^{c g}
- Plectris acutesetosa Frey, 1974^{c g}
- Plectris aenea Blanchard, 1851^{c g}
- Plectris aeneicollis (Moser, 1918)^{c}
- Plectris aeneofusca (Moser, 1918)^{c}
- Plectris aeneomicans Frey, 1967^{c g}
- Plectris aeneorufa (Moser, 1918)^{c g}
- Plectris aenescens (Moser, 1918)^{c}
- Plectris aequatorialis (Moser, 1921)^{c g}
- Plectris aerata Burmeister, 1855^{c g}
- Plectris afflicta Blanchard, 1850^{c g}
- Plectris ahena Burmeister, 1855^{c g}
- Plectris alboscutata Frey, 1967^{c g}
- Plectris albovittata Frey, 1967^{c g}
- Plectris aliena Chapin, 1934^{i c g b}
- Plectris alternata Frey, 1967^{c g}
- Plectris alvarengai Frey, 1967^{c g}
- Plectris amabilis Frey, 1967^{c g}
- Plectris ambigua Frey, 1967^{c g}
- Plectris ambitiosa (Blanchard, 1850)^{c g}
- Plectris amoena Frey, 1973^{c g}
- Plectris andicola Frey, 1969^{c g}
- Plectris andina Frey, 1967^{c g}
- Plectris angerona Blanchard, 1850^{c g}
- Plectris angusta Frey, 1974^{c g}
- Plectris anomala (Kirsch, 1885)^{c g}
- Plectris antennalis (Moser, 1924)^{c g}
- Plectris antennata Frey, 1969^{c g}
- Plectris apicalis (Moser, 1921)^{c}
- Plectris archidonensis (Moser, 1924)^{c g}
- Plectris argentata Frey, 1967^{c g}
- Plectris argentina (Bruch, 1909)^{c g}
- Plectris atubana Frey, 1972^{c g}
- Plectris aulai (Bruch, 1909)^{c g}
- Plectris bahiensis Frey, 1975^{c g}
- Plectris balthasari Frey, 1967^{c g}
- Plectris baraudi Frey, 1967^{c g}
- Plectris barbitarsis (Moser, 1919)^{c g}
- Plectris barda Blanchard, 1850^{c g}
- Plectris bicolor Frey, 1967^{c g}
- Plectris bilobata (Moser, 1921)^{c g}
- Plectris binotata Blanchard, 1850^{c g}
- Plectris blanchardi Frey, 1967^{c g}
- Plectris boliviensis (Moser, 1921)^{c g}
- Plectris bonariensis (Bruch, 1909)^{c g}
- Plectris breiti Frey, 1967^{c g}
- Plectris breviceps Frey, 1967^{c g}
- Plectris brevicollis (Moser, 1919)^{c g}
- Plectris brevipes (Blanchard, 1850)^{c g}
- Plectris brevipilosa Moser, 1924^{c g}
- Plectris brevis Blanchard, 1851^{c g}
- Plectris brevisetosa Moser, 1918^{c g}
- Plectris brevitarsis (Blanchard, 1850)^{c g}
- Plectris brittoni Frey, 1967^{c g}
- Plectris bruchi Moser, 1924^{c g}
- Plectris burmeisteri (Kirsch, 1871)^{c g}
- Plectris calcarata Frey, 1967^{c g}
- Plectris caliginosa Blanchard, 1850^{c g}
- Plectris calva Frey, 1969^{c g}
- Plectris candezei Frey, 1967^{c g}
- Plectris caniventris (Burmeister, 1855)^{c g}
- Plectris castaneipennis (Moser, 1921)^{c g}
- Plectris cayennensis (Moser, 1921)^{c}
- Plectris centralis (Bruch, 1909)^{c g}
- Plectris ceylanica (Nonfried, 1894)^{c g}
- Plectris ciliata Frey, 1967^{c g}
- Plectris cinerascens (Blanchard, 1850)^{c}
- Plectris cinereopilosa (Moser, 1924)^{c g}
- Plectris clypealis Frey, 1975^{c g}
- Plectris clypeata Burmeister, 1855^{c g}
- Plectris collarti Frey, 1967^{c g}
- Plectris comata (Blanchard, 1850)^{c g}
- Plectris conformis Frey, 1967^{c g}
- Plectris contaminata Blanchard, 1850^{c g}
- Plectris cordobana (Moser, 1924)^{c}
- Plectris corrientensis (Moser, 1919)^{c g}
- Plectris corumbana Moser, 1921^{c g}
- Plectris corvicoana (Moser, 1919)^{c g}
- Plectris costulata Frey, 1967^{c g}
- Plectris coxalis (Moser, 1921)^{c g}
- Plectris crassa Blanchard, 1850^{c g}
- Plectris crassesetosa Frey, 1967^{c g}
- Plectris cucullata Burmeister, 1855^{c g}
- Plectris curta Burmeister, 1855^{c g}
- Plectris curticollis Frey, 1967^{c g}
- Plectris curtipilis Frey, 1967^{c g}
- Plectris curtisetis Frey, 1969^{c g}
- Plectris cuyana (Bruch, 1909)^{c g}
- Plectris cylindrica Burmeister, 1855^{c g}
- Plectris cylindriformis Frey, 1967^{c g}
- Plectris decipiens Burmeister, 1855^{c g}
- Plectris decolorata Blanchard, 1850^{c g}
- Plectris delicatula (Blanchard, 1850)^{c g}
- Plectris denominata Frey, 1967^{c g}
- Plectris densaticollis Frey, 1967^{c g}
- Plectris densehirsuta Frey, 1967^{c g}
- Plectris densevestita (Moser, 1924)^{c g}
- Plectris depressicollis Frey, 1967^{c g}
- Plectris desiderata Evans, 2003^{c g}
- Plectris devillei Frey, 1967^{c g}
- Plectris difformis Frey, 1973^{c g}
- Plectris dimorpha Frey, 1976^{c g}
- Plectris distincta (Bruch, 1909)^{c g}
- Plectris duplopilosa (Moser, 1921)^{c g}
- Plectris elongata Burmeister, 1855^{c g}
- Plectris emarginata (Moser, 1921)^{c g}
- Plectris endroedii Frey, 1967^{c g}
- Plectris eucalypti Frey, 1973^{c g}
- Plectris eusquamosa Frey, 1975^{c g}
- Plectris evansi Smith, 2008^{c g}
- Plectris excisiceps (Moser, 1921)^{c}
- Plectris exigua Frey, 1973^{c g}
- Plectris fallax (Blanchard, 1850)^{c g}
- Plectris farinosa Burmeister, 1855^{c g}
- Plectris fassli (Moser, 1919)^{c}
- Plectris festiva (Burmeister, 1855)^{c}
- Plectris flavicornis (Burmeister, 1855)^{c}
- Plectris flavohirta Blanchard, 1851^{c g}
- Plectris fulgida Frey, 1973^{c g}
- Plectris fulva Blanchard, 1851^{c g}
- Plectris fungicola Arrow, 1900^{c g}
- Plectris fusca Moser, 1918^{c g}
- Plectris fuscoaenea Moser, 1921^{c g}
- Plectris fuscoviridis (Moser, 1918)^{c g}
- Plectris fuscula (Moser, 1918)^{c g}
- Plectris gaudichaudi (Blanchard, 1851)^{c g}
- Plectris gebieni (Moser, 1921)^{c g}
- Plectris glabrata Frey, 1967^{c g}
- Plectris glabripennis Frey, 1967^{c g}
- Plectris globulicollis Frey, 1973^{c g}
- Plectris goetzi Frey, 1967^{c g}
- Plectris gracilicornis Moser, 1918^{c g}
- Plectris grisea Moser, 1921^{c g}
- Plectris griseohirta Frey, 1967^{c g}
- Plectris griseopilosa (Moser, 1921)^{c}
- Plectris griseosetosa (Moser, 1924)^{c g}
- Plectris griseovestita Moser, 1921^{c g}
- Plectris guayrana Frey, 1967^{c g}
- Plectris gutierrezi Frey, 1967^{c g}
- Plectris hellmichi Frey, 1967^{c g}
- Plectris herteli Frey, 1967^{c g}
- Plectris hispidula Frey, 1974^{c g}
- Plectris huedepohli Frey, 1967^{c g}
- Plectris imitans Frey, 1967^{c g}
- Plectris incana (Burmeister, 1855)^{c g}
- Plectris indigens Blanchard, 1850^{c g}
- Plectris inopinata Frey, 1973^{c g}
- Plectris integrata (Bates, 1887)^{c g}
- Plectris intermixta Frey, 1967^{c g}
- Plectris juengeri Frey, 1969^{c g}
- Plectris juncea (Burmeister, 1855)^{c g}
- Plectris junceana Frey, 1969^{c g}
- Plectris katovichi Smith, 2008^{c g}
- Plectris kirschi Frey, 1967^{c g}
- Plectris kochi Frey, 1967^{c g}
- Plectris kriegi Frey, 1973^{c g}
- Plectris kulzeri Frey, 1967^{c g}
- Plectris kuntzeni Moser, 1921^{c g}
- Plectris laevipennis Frey, 1967^{c g}
- Plectris laevis Frey, 1967^{c g}
- Plectris laeviscutata (Moser, 1918)^{c}
- Plectris lanata Frey, 1964^{c g}
- Plectris laticeps Blanchard, 1850^{c g}
- Plectris lepida (Burmeister, 1855)^{c g}
- Plectris lignicola Arrow, 1900^{c g}
- Plectris lignicolor Blanchard, 1850^{c g}
- Plectris ligulata Frey, 1969^{c g}
- Plectris lindneri Frey, 1967^{c g}
- Plectris lineatocollis (Blanchard, 1850)^{c g}
- Plectris lobaticeps Frey, 1967^{c g}
- Plectris lobaticollis Frey, 1967^{c g}
- Plectris lojana (Moser, 1924)^{c g}
- Plectris longeantennata Frey, 1967^{c g}
- Plectris longiclava Frey, 1976^{c g}
- Plectris longicornis (Burmeister, 1855)^{c g}
- Plectris longitarsis (Bates, 1887)^{c g}
- Plectris longula Moser, 1918^{c g}
- Plectris luctuosa Frey, 1967^{c g}
- Plectris maculata (Moser, 1919)^{c}
- Plectris maculicollis (Arrow, 1925)^{c g}
- Plectris maculifera Frey, 1976^{c g}
- Plectris maculipennis (Moser, 1918)^{c g}
- Plectris maculipyga Moser, 1918^{c g}
- Plectris maculosa (Moser, 1918)^{c}
- Plectris magdalenae Frey, 1967^{c g}
- Plectris mandli Frey, 1967^{c g}
- Plectris marmorea (Guérin-Méneville, 1830)^{c g}
- Plectris martinezi Frey, 1967^{c g}
- Plectris martinicensis Chalumeau, 1982^{c g}
- Plectris meridana (Moser, 1918)^{c}
- Plectris metallica (Moser, 1918)^{c g}
- Plectris micans (Kirsch, 1885)^{c g}
- Plectris minuta (Moser, 1920)^{c g}
- Plectris molesta (Kirsch, 1873)^{c g}
- Plectris montana Frey, 1967^{c g}
- Plectris moseri Saylor, 1935^{c g}
- Plectris murina (Blanchard, 1850)^{c}
- Plectris mus Blanchard, 1851^{c g}
- Plectris muscula Frey, 1967^{c g}
- Plectris neglecta Blanchard, 1850^{c g}
- Plectris nigrita Moser, 1918^{c g}
- Plectris nigritula (Moser, 1918)^{c}
- Plectris nitidicollis Frey, 1967^{c g}
- Plectris niveoscutata Moser, 1918^{c g}
- Plectris nuda Frey, 1967^{c g}
- Plectris nudicollis Frey, 1967^{c g}
- Plectris obsoleta Blanchard, 1850^{c g}
- Plectris obtusa (Burmeister, 1855)^{c g}
- Plectris obtusioides Frey, 1967^{c g}
- Plectris obtusior Frey, 1967^{c g}
- Plectris ocularis Frey, 1967^{c g}
- Plectris ohausi (Bruch, 1909)^{c g}
- Plectris ohausiana (Moser, 1921)^{c g}
- Plectris ohausiella Frey, 1967^{c g}
- Plectris olivierai Frey, 1974^{c g}
- Plectris opacula Moser, 1918^{c g}
- Plectris ophthalmica Frey, 1967^{c g}
- Plectris ornaticeps Frey, 1967^{c g}
- Plectris ornatipennis (Moser, 1921)^{c}
- Plectris orocuensis Frey, 1967^{c g}
- Plectris palpalis (Moser, 1918)^{c}
- Plectris panamaensis Frey, 1967^{c g}
- Plectris paraensis Frey, 1967^{c g}
- Plectris paraguayensis (Moser, 1921)^{c}
- Plectris parallela Frey, 1976^{c g}
- Plectris paranensis (Moser, 1921)^{c g}
- Plectris parcesetosa Frey, 1976^{c g}
- Plectris parumsetosa Frey, 1969^{c g}
- Plectris pauloana Moser, 1924^{c g}
- Plectris pavida (Burmeister, 1855)^{c g}
- Plectris pedestris Frey, 1967^{c g}
- Plectris pelliculata (Perty, 1830)^{c g}
- Plectris penaella Frey, 1967^{c g}
- Plectris penai Frey, 1967^{c g}
- Plectris pentaphylla (Moser, 1918)^{c}
- Plectris pereirai Frey, 1967^{c g}
- Plectris perplexa Blanchard, 1850^{c g}
- Plectris pexa (Germar, 1824)^{c g}
- Plectris picea Evans, 2003^{c g}
- Plectris pilicollis (Moser, 1921)^{c g}
- Plectris pilifera (Moser, 1919)^{c}
- Plectris pilosa (Moser, 1921)^{c}
- Plectris pilosula (Moser, 1921)^{c}
- Plectris pinsdorfi Frey, 1967^{c g}
- Plectris piottii (Bruch, 1909)^{c g}
- Plectris plaumanni Frey, 1967^{c g}
- Plectris plaumanniella Frey, 1967^{c g}
- Plectris podicalis Moser, 1921^{c g}
- Plectris postnotata Frey, 1967^{c g}
- Plectris praecellens Frey, 1969^{c g}
- Plectris primaria (Burmeister, 1855)^{c}
- Plectris prolata Evans, 2003^{c g}
- Plectris pruina (Burmeister, 1855)^{c g}
- Plectris pubens (Moser, 1921)^{c g}
- Plectris pubera (Burmeister, 1855)^{c}
- Plectris puberoides Frey, 1976^{c g}
- Plectris pubescens Blanchard, 1850^{c g}
- Plectris pusio Frey, 1967^{c g}
- Plectris putida Frey, 1967^{c g}
- Plectris pygmaea Frey, 1973^{c g}
- Plectris quinqueflabellata (Moser, 1926)^{c}
- Plectris reitteri Frey, 1967^{c g}
- Plectris reticulata Frey, 1967^{c g}
- Plectris riodejaneiroensis Evans, 2003^{c g}
- Plectris riveti Frey, 1967^{c g}
- Plectris roeri Frey, 1967^{c g}
- Plectris rorida (Burmeister, 1855)^{c}
- Plectris rubescens Blanchard, 1850^{c g}
- Plectris ruffoi Frey, 1972^{c g}
- Plectris ruficollis Frey, 1976^{c g}
- Plectris rufina (Moser, 1926)^{c g}
- Plectris rugiceps (Moser, 1921)^{c g}
- Plectris rugipennis (Moser, 1921)^{c}
- Plectris rugulosa Blanchard, 1850^{c g}
- Plectris rugulosipennis Blanchard, 1851^{c g}
- Plectris santaecrucis Frey, 1972^{c g}
- Plectris santosana Frey, 1967^{c g}
- Plectris sarana (Moser, 1921)^{c g}
- Plectris schereri Frey, 1967^{c g}
- Plectris schneblei Frey, 1967^{c g}
- Plectris schoolmeestersi Smith, 2015^{c g}
- Plectris scopulata (Burmeister, 1855)^{c g}
- Plectris sculpturata Frey, 1967^{c g}
- Plectris sculptipennis Frey, 1974^{c g}
- Plectris scutalis Blanchard, 1850^{c g}
- Plectris scutellaris Blanchard, 1850^{c g}
- Plectris sequela Evans, 2003^{c g}
- Plectris sericea (Moser, 1921)^{c g}
- Plectris setifera Burmeister, 1855^{c g}
- Plectris setisparsa (Bates, 1887)^{c g}
- Plectris setiventris Moser, 1918^{c g}
- Plectris setosa Moser, 1924^{c g}
- Plectris setosella (Moser, 1919)^{c g}
- Plectris setulifera (Moser, 1919)^{c g}
- Plectris signaticollis Frey, 1974^{c g}
- Plectris signativentris Moser, 1918^{c g}
- Plectris similis Frey, 1973^{c g}
- Plectris sinuaticeps (Moser, 1921)^{c g}
- Plectris sordida (Burmeister, 1855)^{c}
- Plectris sororia (Moser, 1919)^{c g}
- Plectris sparsecrinita Frey, 1976^{c g}
- Plectris sparsepilosa Frey, 1967^{c g}
- Plectris sparsepunctata Frey, 1967^{c g}
- Plectris sparsesetosa (Moser, 1924)^{c g}
- Plectris spatulata Frey, 1967^{c g}
- Plectris splendens Frey, 1967^{c g}
- Plectris splendida Frey, 1967^{c g}
- Plectris squalida Frey, 1967^{c g}
- Plectris squamiger Frey, 1967^{c g}
- Plectris squamisetis Frey, 1967^{c g}
- Plectris subaenea Moser, 1918^{c g}
- Plectris subcarinata Frey, 1967^{c g}
- Plectris subcostata Blanchard, 1850^{c g}
- Plectris subdepressa Blanchard, 1850^{c g}
- Plectris subglabra (Moser, 1918)^{c g}
- Plectris sulcicollis (Moser, 1919)^{c}
- Plectris suturalis Burmeister, 1855^{c g}
- Plectris tacoma Smith, 2008^{c g}
- Plectris talinay Mondaca, 2010^{c g}
- Plectris tarsalis (Moser, 1919)^{c g}
- Plectris tenebrosa Frey, 1967^{c g}
- Plectris tenueclava Frey, 1976^{c g}
- Plectris tenuevestita Frey, 1967^{c g}
- Plectris tessellata Burmeister, 1855^{c g}
- Plectris tetraphylla Frey, 1967^{c g}
- Plectris teutoniensis Frey, 1969^{c g}
- Plectris tolimana (Moser, 1921)^{c}
- Plectris tomentosa Serville, 1825^{c g}
- Plectris tricostata (Burmeister, 1855)^{c g}
- Plectris tristis Frey, 1967^{c g}
- Plectris truncata (Blanchard, 1850)^{c}
- Plectris tuberculata (Moser, 1919)^{c}
- Plectris tucumana (Bruch, 1909)^{c g}
- Plectris umbilicata Frey, 1967^{c g}
- Plectris umbrata Frey, 1967^{c g}
- Plectris unidens Frey, 1967^{c g}
- Plectris validior Burmeister, 1855^{c g}
- Plectris variegata (Moser, 1919)^{c g}
- Plectris variipennis Moser, 1921^{c g}
- Plectris vauriella Frey, 1967^{c g}
- Plectris vestita (Burmeister, 1855)^{c}
- Plectris vicina Frey, 1967^{c g}
- Plectris vilis (Burmeister, 1855)^{c g}
- Plectris villiersi Frey, 1967^{c g}
- Plectris violascens Blanchard, 1851^{c g}
- Plectris virescens (Blanchard, 1846)^{c g}
- Plectris viridifusca (Moser, 1918)^{c}
- Plectris viridimicans (Moser, 1918)^{c}
- Plectris vitticollis Moser, 1918^{c g}
- Plectris vittipennis Frey, 1972^{c g}
- Plectris vonvolxemi Frey, 1967^{c g}
- Plectris wittmeri Frey, 1967^{c g}
- Plectris witzgalli Frey, 1973^{c g}
- Plectris wolfrumi Frey, 1969^{c g}
- Plectris yungasa Frey, 1975^{c g}
- Plectris zikani (Moser, 1924)^{c}
- Plectris zischkaella Frey, 1967^{c g}
- Plectris zischkai Frey, 1967^{c g}

Data sources: i = ITIS, c = Catalogue of Life, g = GBIF, b = Bugguide.net

== Selected former species ==
- Plectris metallescens (Moser, 1918)^{c}
