= Rhinaspis (beetle) =

Scientific classification
- Kingdom: Animalia
- Phylum: Arthropoda
- Class: Insecta
- Order: Coleoptera
- Suborder: Polyphaga
- Infraorder: Scarabaeiformia
- Family: Scarabaeidae
- Subfamily: Melolonthinae
- Tribe: Macrodactylini
- Genus: Rhinaspis; Perty, 1830

Synonyms
- Rhinaspoides Moser, 1919; Barybas Burmeister, 1855; Ulomenes Blanchard, 1850; Mallogaster Dejean, 1836; Hyporhiza Dejean, 1833

Genus of leaf beetles

Rhinaspis is a genus of beetles belonging to the family Scarabaeidae.

== Species ==
- Rhinaspis aenea (Billberg, 1820)
- Rhinaspis aeneocuprea Moser, 1921
- Rhinaspis aeneofusca (Moser, 1919)
- Rhinaspis dilaticornis Moser, 1924
- Rhinaspis fuhrmanni Smith, 2016
- Rhinaspis fusca Moser, 1924
- Rhinaspis hypocrita (Mannerheim, 1828)
- Rhinaspis micans Burmeister, 1855
- Rhinaspis murina Burmeister, 1855
- Rhinaspis ohausi Moser, 1921
- Rhinaspis rugicollis Moser, 1924
- Rhinaspis setosa Frey, 1974
- Rhinaspis umbilicata Frey, 1973
