= Plectris ciliata =

Scientific classification
- Kingdom: Animalia
- Phylum: Arthropoda
- Class: Insecta
- Order: Coleoptera
- Suborder: Polyphaga
- Infraorder: Scarabaeiformia
- Family: Scarabaeidae
- Genus: Plectris
- Species: P. ciliata

Binomial name
- Plectris ciliata Frey, 1967

Species of beetle

Plectris ciliata is a species of beetle of the family Scarabaeidae. It is found in Brazil.

== Description ==
Adults reach a length of about 12 mm. They are brown, moderately glossy. The clypeus has thin and short hairs, while the rest of the upper surface is covered with long and fairly densely appressed setae. Numerous setae are present on the pronotum and elytra, which are particularly dense on the apical pygidium.
