= Plectris squalida =

Scientific classification
- Kingdom: Animalia
- Phylum: Arthropoda
- Class: Insecta
- Order: Coleoptera
- Suborder: Polyphaga
- Infraorder: Scarabaeiformia
- Family: Scarabaeidae
- Genus: Plectris
- Species: P. squalida

Binomial name
- Plectris squalida Frey, 1967

Species of beetle

Plectris squalida is a species of beetle of the family Scarabaeidae. It is found in Brazil (Santa Catarina).

== Description ==
Adults reach a length of about 10 mm. They are brown and somewhat glossy. The upper surface is very sparsely pubescent. The pronotum has a few short setae, as do the base, the hind angles, and (on the elytra) the sides and the sutural stria. The underside of the thorax is covered with long pubescence.
