= Plectris andina =

Scientific classification
- Kingdom: Animalia
- Phylum: Arthropoda
- Class: Insecta
- Order: Coleoptera
- Suborder: Polyphaga
- Infraorder: Scarabaeiformia
- Family: Scarabaeidae
- Genus: Plectris
- Species: P. andina

Binomial name
- Plectris andina Frey, 1967

Species of beetle

Plectris andina is a species of beetle of the family Scarabaeidae. It is found in Bolivia.

== Description ==
Adults reach a length of about 8 mm. They are dark brown and dull. The upper surface is rather sparsely covered with somewhat erect, rather short, light setae. The setae are almost all the same length, only on the elytra are there some somewhat longer and more erect setae. The underside is quite densely covered with appressed, light, somewhat longer and finer setae. This is also the case for the pygidium, at the tip of which the setae are somewhat erect.
