= Plectris huedepohli =

Scientific classification
- Kingdom: Animalia
- Phylum: Arthropoda
- Class: Insecta
- Order: Coleoptera
- Suborder: Polyphaga
- Infraorder: Scarabaeiformia
- Family: Scarabaeidae
- Genus: Plectris
- Species: P. huedepohli

Binomial name
- Plectris huedepohli Frey, 1967

Species of beetle

Plectris huedepohli is a species of beetle of the family Scarabaeidae. It is found in Brazil.

== Description ==
Adults reach a length of about 11–15 mm. They are brown. The clypeus and frons are sparsely covered, while the vertex, pronotum and elytra are moderately densely covered with appressed pale setae. The pronotum has a few, the elytra somewhat more numerous, irregularly distributed, considerably stronger and longer setae. Numerous setae are also present on the apical half of the pygidium.
