= Plectris tenuevestita =

Scientific classification
- Kingdom: Animalia
- Phylum: Arthropoda
- Class: Insecta
- Order: Coleoptera
- Suborder: Polyphaga
- Infraorder: Scarabaeiformia
- Family: Scarabaeidae
- Genus: Plectris
- Species: P. tenuevestita

Binomial name
- Plectris tenuevestita Frey, 1967

Species of beetle

Plectris tenuevestita is a species of beetle of the family Scarabaeidae. It is found in Paraguay.

== Description ==
Adults reach a length of about 10 mm. The upper and lower surfaces are light brown and moderately glossy. The upper and lower surfaces, including the scutellum, have fine sparse, short hairs. On the pygidium, the hairs are somewhat longer and more erect. The elytra and pronotum have pale cilia.
