= Plectris rubescens =

Scientific classification
- Kingdom: Animalia
- Phylum: Arthropoda
- Class: Insecta
- Order: Coleoptera
- Suborder: Polyphaga
- Infraorder: Scarabaeiformia
- Family: Scarabaeidae
- Genus: Plectris
- Species: P. rubescens

Binomial name
- Plectris rubescens Blanchard, 1850

Synonyms
- Philochlaenia tijucana Moser, 1919; Pseudoserica amazonica Bates, 1887; Philochlaenia puta Burmeister, 1855

Species of beetle

Plectris rubescens is a species of beetle of the family Scarabaeidae. It is found in Brazil (Rio de Janeiro, Santa Catarina).

== Description ==
Adults reach a length of about 8–9 mm. They are reddish-brown. The upper surface is moderately dense, perfectly uniform, covered with rather short, appressed setae.
