= Plectris putida =

Scientific classification
- Kingdom: Animalia
- Phylum: Arthropoda
- Class: Insecta
- Order: Coleoptera
- Suborder: Polyphaga
- Infraorder: Scarabaeiformia
- Family: Scarabaeidae
- Genus: Plectris
- Species: P. putida

Binomial name
- Plectris putida Frey, 1967

Species of beetle

Plectris putida is a species of beetle of the family Scarabaeidae. It is found in Bolivia.

== Description ==
Adults reach a length of about 12 mm. The upper and lower surfaces are brown, almost dull and, except for the anterior part of the clypeus, quite finely, moderately densely, covered with medium-length light grey hairs. Setae are usually only found on the apical margin of the pygidium.
