= Plectris wittmeri =

Scientific classification
- Kingdom: Animalia
- Phylum: Arthropoda
- Class: Insecta
- Order: Coleoptera
- Suborder: Polyphaga
- Infraorder: Scarabaeiformia
- Family: Scarabaeidae
- Genus: Plectris
- Species: P. wittmeri

Binomial name
- Plectris wittmeri Frey, 1967

Species of beetle

Plectris wittmeri is a species of beetle of the family Scarabaeidae. It is found in Argentina.

== Description ==
Adults reach a length of about 10 mm. They are dark brown. The clypeus is sparsely covered with fine, somewhat appressed hairs and the head, pronotum and elytra are densely covered with long, mostly appressed, light hairs, mixed with even longer, erect hairs. The thorax is covered with long hairs.
