= Plectris santosana =

Scientific classification
- Kingdom: Animalia
- Phylum: Arthropoda
- Class: Insecta
- Order: Coleoptera
- Suborder: Polyphaga
- Infraorder: Scarabaeiformia
- Family: Scarabaeidae
- Genus: Plectris
- Species: P. santosana

Binomial name
- Plectris santosana Frey, 1967

Species of beetle

Plectris santosana is a species of beetle of the family Scarabaeidae. It is found in Brazil (São Paulo).

== Description ==
Adults reach a length of about 14–18 mm. The upper and lower surfaces are dark brown and dull. The clypeus is sparsely covered with erect brown hairs. The remaining upper and lower surfaces are very densely covered with long, bristle-like yellowish hairs. The thorax and pygidium have longer hairs. The margins of the pronotum are fringed with long, pale cilia.
