= Pseudoserica =

Scientific classification
- Kingdom: Animalia
- Phylum: Arthropoda
- Clade: Pancrustacea
- Class: Insecta
- Order: Coleoptera
- Suborder: Polyphaga
- Infraorder: Scarabaeiformia
- Family: Scarabaeidae
- Subfamily: Melolonthinae
- Tribe: Macrodactylini
- Genus: Pseudoserica; Guérin-Méneville, 1838

Synonyms
- Harpodactyla Burmeister, 1855; Gama Blanchard, 1850; Pachylotoma Blanchard, 1850

Genus of leaf beetles

Pseudoserica is a genus of beetles belonging to the family Scarabaeidae.

== Species ==
- Pseudoserica aenea (Moser, 1924)
- Pseudoserica aeneotincta (Moser, 1918)
- Pseudoserica aeneovaria (Moser, 1918)
- Pseudoserica aeneoviridis (Moser, 1918)
- Pseudoserica aenescens (Moser, 1918)
- Pseudoserica angustula (Moser, 1921)
- Pseudoserica aurichalcea (Burmeister, 1855)
- Pseudoserica breviceps (Moser, 1918)
- Pseudoserica esperitosantensis (Moser, 1919)
- Pseudoserica fulvipennis (Moser, 1918)
- Pseudoserica fusca (Blanchard, 1850)
- Pseudoserica fuscoaenea (Moser, 1921)
- Pseudoserica grandicornis (Blanchard, 1850)
- Pseudoserica hamifera (Moser, 1921)
- Pseudoserica lepichaeta (Moser, 1919)
- Pseudoserica lutea (Moser, 1924)
- Pseudoserica marmorea Guérin-Méneville, 1831
- Pseudoserica metallescens (Moser, 1918)
- Pseudoserica musiva (Burmeister, 1855)
- Pseudoserica ohausi (Moser, 1921)
- Pseudoserica pallida (Blanchard, 1850)
- Pseudoserica pilosa (Moser, 1918)
- Pseudoserica pulverulenta (Burmeister, 1855)
- Pseudoserica quadrifoliata (Moser, 1918)
- Pseudoserica relucens (Blanchard, 1850)
- Pseudoserica rufoflava (Moser, 1919)
- Pseudoserica rugipennis (Moser, 1918)
- Pseudoserica squamiventris (Steinheil, 1872)
- Pseudoserica viridescens (Moser, 1918)
- Pseudoserica viridiaenea (Moser, 1918)
- Pseudoserica viridifusca (Moser, 1918)
- Pseudoserica viridis (Blanchard, 1850)
