= Plectris longiclava =

Scientific classification
- Kingdom: Animalia
- Phylum: Arthropoda
- Class: Insecta
- Order: Coleoptera
- Suborder: Polyphaga
- Infraorder: Scarabaeiformia
- Family: Scarabaeidae
- Genus: Plectris
- Species: P. longiclava

Binomial name
- Plectris longiclava Frey, 1976

Species of beetle

Plectris longiclava is a species of beetle of the family Scarabaeidae. It is found in Brazil (Mato Grosso).

== Description ==
Adults reach a length of about 10 mm. The upper and lower surfaces are dark brown and shiny, with the head, pronotum, scutellum and elytra moderately densely and evenly covered with short, erect, yellowish setae. The antennae are light brown.
