= Plectris umbrata =

Scientific classification
- Kingdom: Animalia
- Phylum: Arthropoda
- Class: Insecta
- Order: Coleoptera
- Suborder: Polyphaga
- Infraorder: Scarabaeiformia
- Family: Scarabaeidae
- Genus: Plectris
- Species: P. umbrata

Binomial name
- Plectris umbrata Frey, 1967

Species of beetle

Plectris umbrata is a species of beetle of the family Scarabaeidae. It is found in Brazil (Pará).

== Description ==
Adults reach a length of about 11 mm. They are dark brown and dull. The upper surface is sparsely but fairly evenly covered with short, appressed setae. A few scattered setae are found on the elytra, and a few smaller and stronger tufts on the apical calluses of the elytra. The underside is considerably more densely covered with appressed, light-coloured, and short hairs.
