= Plectris curticollis =

Scientific classification
- Kingdom: Animalia
- Phylum: Arthropoda
- Class: Insecta
- Order: Coleoptera
- Suborder: Polyphaga
- Infraorder: Scarabaeiformia
- Family: Scarabaeidae
- Genus: Plectris
- Species: P. curticollis

Binomial name
- Plectris curticollis Frey, 1967

Species of beetle

Plectris curticollis is a species of beetle of the family Scarabaeidae. It is found in Brazil (Rio Grande do Sul).

== Description ==
Adults reach a length of about 12 mm. They are dark brown, moderately glossy and moderately densely covered with light grey hairs.
