= Plectris roeri =

Scientific classification
- Kingdom: Animalia
- Phylum: Arthropoda
- Class: Insecta
- Order: Coleoptera
- Suborder: Polyphaga
- Infraorder: Scarabaeiformia
- Family: Scarabaeidae
- Genus: Plectris
- Species: P. roeri

Binomial name
- Plectris roeri Frey, 1967

Species of beetle

Plectris roeri is a species of beetle of the family Scarabaeidae. It is found in Brazil (Minas Gerais).

== Description ==
Adults reach a length of about 12–13 mm. They are light brown and slightly glossy. The upper surface is sparsely covered with light grey hairs. The underside and the pygidium are covered with appressed and fairly dense light hairs. The pygidium also has erect hairs at the tip.
