= Pseudoserica hamifera =

Scientific classification
- Kingdom: Animalia
- Phylum: Arthropoda
- Clade: Pancrustacea
- Class: Insecta
- Order: Coleoptera
- Suborder: Polyphaga
- Infraorder: Scarabaeiformia
- Family: Scarabaeidae
- Genus: Pseudoserica
- Species: P. hamifera

Binomial name
- Pseudoserica hamifera (Moser, 1921)

Synonyms
- Plectris hamifera Moser, 1921; Gama rotundiceps Frey, 1964

Species of beetle

Pseudoserica hamifera is a species of beetle of the family Scarabaeidae. It is found in Brazil (Mato Grosso).

== Description ==
Adults reach a length of about 12–13 mm. They are reddish-brown and glossy, with the upper surface smooth and the underside covered with long, dense, whitish hairs. The elytra, pronotum and lateral margin of the head are fringed with cilia. The apical half of the pygidium has long, thin, brownish hairs. The antennae are somewhat lighter.
