= Plectris tristis =

Scientific classification
- Kingdom: Animalia
- Phylum: Arthropoda
- Class: Insecta
- Order: Coleoptera
- Suborder: Polyphaga
- Infraorder: Scarabaeiformia
- Family: Scarabaeidae
- Genus: Plectris
- Species: P. tristis

Binomial name
- Plectris tristis Frey, 1967

Species of beetle

Plectris tristis is a species of beetle of the family Scarabaeidae. It is found in Argentina.

== Description ==
Adults reach a length of about 12 mm. They are brown (but the antennae light brown) and slightly glossy. The pronotum is not very densely, evenly covered with longer, the elytra with shorter hairs. On the pronotum and at the base of the elytra, there are also bristly hairs, which are considerably longer but only slightly coarser than the appressed hairs.
