= Plectris aeneomicans =

Scientific classification
- Kingdom: Animalia
- Phylum: Arthropoda
- Class: Insecta
- Order: Coleoptera
- Suborder: Polyphaga
- Infraorder: Scarabaeiformia
- Family: Scarabaeidae
- Genus: Plectris
- Species: P. aeneomicans

Binomial name
- Plectris aeneomicans Frey, 1967

Species of beetle

Plectris aeneomicans is a species of beetle of the family Scarabaeidae. It is found in Brazil (Espírito Santo).

== Description ==
Adults reach a length of about 15–18 mm. They are dirt-coloured and shiny. The head is covered with short, appressed setae, which form a row along the posterior margin. The pronotum and elytra are very sparsely covered with short, appressed setae. The underside and pygidium are covered with somewhat longer, closely appressed setae, which become somewhat longer on the thorax.
