= Plectris pereirai =

Scientific classification
- Kingdom: Animalia
- Phylum: Arthropoda
- Class: Insecta
- Order: Coleoptera
- Suborder: Polyphaga
- Infraorder: Scarabaeiformia
- Family: Scarabaeidae
- Genus: Plectris
- Species: P. pereirai

Binomial name
- Plectris pereirai Frey, 1967

Species of beetle

Plectris pereirai is a species of beetle of the family Scarabaeidae. It is found in Brazil (Espírito Santo).

== Description ==
Adults reach a length of about 12–13 mm. They are dark brown and rather glossy. The clypeus has short rather fine bristles, while the pronotum, elytra, pygidium and underside are moderately densely covered with moderately long, rather fine bristles.
