= Plectris laevipennis =

Scientific classification
- Kingdom: Animalia
- Phylum: Arthropoda
- Class: Insecta
- Order: Coleoptera
- Suborder: Polyphaga
- Infraorder: Scarabaeiformia
- Family: Scarabaeidae
- Genus: Plectris
- Species: P. laevipennis

Binomial name
- Plectris laevipennis Frey, 1967

Species of beetle

Plectris laevipennis is a species of beetle of the family Scarabaeidae. It is found in Brazil (Espírito Santo).

== Description ==
Adults reach a length of about 8 mm. They are moderately glossy, blackish-brown, with the legs and antennae light brown. The elytra are smooth except for a few short hairs at the margin, apex, and base. The head and pronotum are covered with appressed, pale, but sparsely dense, short hairs. The underside has appressed and the pygidium somewhat erect short, dense, and grey hairs.
