= Plectris reticulata =

Scientific classification
- Kingdom: Animalia
- Phylum: Arthropoda
- Class: Insecta
- Order: Coleoptera
- Suborder: Polyphaga
- Infraorder: Scarabaeiformia
- Family: Scarabaeidae
- Genus: Plectris
- Species: P. reticulata

Binomial name
- Plectris reticulata Frey, 1967

Species of beetle

Plectris reticulata is a species of beetle of the family Scarabaeidae. It is found in Brazil (Rio de Janeiro).

== Description ==
Adults reach a length of about 11 mm. They are dark brown, with the elytra slightly lighter. The clypeus has a few small, erect setae, while the rest of the head has appressed, scattered, somewhat longer setae and the pronotum and elytra are somewhat unevenly, not very densely covered with medium-length, appressed setae. The underside is densely covered with finer, appressed, light-coloured hairs, which are considerably longer, especially on the thorax.
