= Alvarinus =

Scientific classification
- Kingdom: Animalia
- Phylum: Arthropoda
- Class: Insecta
- Order: Coleoptera
- Suborder: Polyphaga
- Infraorder: Scarabaeiformia
- Family: Scarabaeidae
- Subfamily: Melolonthinae
- Tribe: Macrodactylini
- Genus: Alvarinus; Blanchard, 1850

Synonyms
- Corminus Burmeister, 1855

Genus of leaf beetles

Alvarinus is a genus of beetles belonging to the family Scarabaeidae.

== Species ==
- Alvarinus bahianus (Moser, 1919)
- Alvarinus brasiliensis (Moser, 1919)
- Alvarinus canescens (Burmeister, 1855)
- Alvarinus guayaquilanus (Moser, 1921)
- Alvarinus hilarii Blanchard, 1850
- Alvarinus luridipennis (Burmeister, 1855)
- Alvarinus maniculatus (Burmeister, 1855)
- Alvarinus oblongus (Moser, 1919)
- Alvarinus pallidipennis Blanchard, 1850
- Alvarinus parvulus (Moser, 1919)
- Alvarinus rufofuscus (Moser, 1924)
- Alvarinus setulosus (Moser, 1919)
- Alvarinus submetallicus Blanchard, 1850
- Alvarinus subsericeus Blanchard, 1850
- Alvarinus testaceipennis (Moser, 1921)
- Alvarinus varians (Moser, 1921)
