= Plectris guayrana =

Scientific classification
- Kingdom: Animalia
- Phylum: Arthropoda
- Class: Insecta
- Order: Coleoptera
- Suborder: Polyphaga
- Infraorder: Scarabaeiformia
- Family: Scarabaeidae
- Genus: Plectris
- Species: P. guayrana

Binomial name
- Plectris guayrana Frey, 1967

Species of beetle

Plectris guayrana is a species of beetle of the family Scarabaeidae. It is found in Paraguay.

== Description ==
Adults reach a length of about 14 mm. They are dark brown, with the antennae, legs, scutellum and underside lighter brown. The head is very sparsely covered with appressed, rather short white setae. These are mostly scattered on the pronotum and elytra, with only the sides somewhat more densely covered. The scutellum, like the pronotum and elytra, is pubescent. The thorax has long and pale pubescence.
