= Plectris endroedii =

Scientific classification
- Kingdom: Animalia
- Phylum: Arthropoda
- Class: Insecta
- Order: Coleoptera
- Suborder: Polyphaga
- Infraorder: Scarabaeiformia
- Family: Scarabaeidae
- Genus: Plectris
- Species: P. endroedii

Binomial name
- Plectris endroedii Frey, 1967

Synonyms
- Plectris endrödii

Species of beetle

Plectris endroedii is a species of beetle of the family Scarabaeidae. It is found in Brazil (Espírito Santo).

== Description ==
Adults reach a length of about 9 mm. They are dark brown, while the head, pronotum, scutellum, elytra and underside are somewhat lighter brown and dull. The clypeus has a few erect, short setae, while the rest of the head and pronotum are sparsely but evenly covered with somewhat longer, and the elytra with shorter, appressed setae. The underside is densely covered with considerably finer, appressed hairs.
