= Plectris breiti =

Scientific classification
- Kingdom: Animalia
- Phylum: Arthropoda
- Class: Insecta
- Order: Coleoptera
- Suborder: Polyphaga
- Infraorder: Scarabaeiformia
- Family: Scarabaeidae
- Genus: Plectris
- Species: P. breiti

Binomial name
- Plectris breiti Frey, 1967

Species of beetle

Plectris breiti is a species of beetle of the family Scarabaeidae. It is found in Brazil (São Paulo).

== Description ==
Adults reach a length of about 11–13 mm. They are brown, dull to moderately glossy, with light brown antennae. The head is irregularly covered with appressed, rather strong setae. The pronotum and elytra have appressed whitish, not very long setae, and the former also has irregular bare patches. On the elytra, the setae are fairly evenly distributed between the ribs, and arranged in groups on the ribs. The ribs have regular bare patches.
