= Plectris postnotata =

Scientific classification
- Kingdom: Animalia
- Phylum: Arthropoda
- Class: Insecta
- Order: Coleoptera
- Suborder: Polyphaga
- Infraorder: Scarabaeiformia
- Family: Scarabaeidae
- Genus: Plectris
- Species: P. postnotata

Binomial name
- Plectris postnotata Frey, 1967

Species of beetle

Plectris postnotata is a species of beetle of the family Scarabaeidae. It is found in Brazil (São Paulo).

== Description ==
Adults reach a length of about 13 mm. They are dark brown, with the ribs slightly lighter and the antennae light brown. There is thin pubescence on the clypeus, while the pubescence on the head, pronotum and elytra is very dense, rather long and somewhat appressed. On the pronotum, the setae stand out further than on the elytra and are partly somewhat longer. The underside is also very densely pubescent, with somewhat longer, light pubescence on the thorax.
