= Plectris cylindrica =

Scientific classification
- Kingdom: Animalia
- Phylum: Arthropoda
- Class: Insecta
- Order: Coleoptera
- Suborder: Polyphaga
- Infraorder: Scarabaeiformia
- Family: Scarabaeidae
- Genus: Plectris
- Species: P. cylindrica

Binomial name
- Plectris cylindrica Burmeister, 1855

Synonyms
- Philochlaenia gracilicornis Moser, 1919

Species of beetle

Plectris cylindrica is a species of beetle of the family Scarabaeidae. It is found in Brazil (Rio de Janeiro).

== Description ==
Adults reach a length of about 7.5 mm. They have an oblong, brown, dull body, with grey setae. The head and pronotum are greenish-brown. The frons is robust and the clypeus. The punctures are setate. The pronotum is about half as wide as it is long, its surface is quite widely punctate in the middle, becoming somewhat more closely and finely punctate towards the sides, the punctures with bristle-like hairs. The scutellum is densely covered with bristled punctures. On the elytra, the fine appressed setae are moderately dense and the ribs show bristled and glabrous patches. A few somewhat stronger setae are arranged in rows. The pygidium is densely covered with bristled umbilical punctures. The underside is entirely covered with appressed bristle-like hairs.
