= Plectris splendens =

Scientific classification
- Kingdom: Animalia
- Phylum: Arthropoda
- Class: Insecta
- Order: Coleoptera
- Suborder: Polyphaga
- Infraorder: Scarabaeiformia
- Family: Scarabaeidae
- Genus: Plectris
- Species: P. splendens

Binomial name
- Plectris splendens Frey, 1967

Species of beetle

Plectris splendens is a species of beetle of the family Scarabaeidae. It is found in Ecuador.

== Description ==
Adults reach a length of about 16–17 mm. They are brown. The upper surface is strongly glossy, and the head is sparsely covered with long, light brown hairs. The pronotum is densely fringed with light brown cilia on the anterior margin, posteriorly, and especially on the lateral margins, otherwise less densely. The surface of the pronotum is glabrous. The elytra are very sparsely covered with short, appressed hairs and the base and lateral margins are fringed with rather long, light cilia. The underside is covered with very long and dense hairs.
