= Plectris nudicollis =

Scientific classification
- Kingdom: Animalia
- Phylum: Arthropoda
- Class: Insecta
- Order: Coleoptera
- Suborder: Polyphaga
- Infraorder: Scarabaeiformia
- Family: Scarabaeidae
- Genus: Plectris
- Species: P. nudicollis

Binomial name
- Plectris nudicollis Frey, 1967

Species of beetle

Plectris nudicollis is a species of beetle of the family Scarabaeidae. It is found in Bolivia.

== Description ==
Adults reach a length of about 14–15 mm. They have a brown, glossy, elongated body. The clypeus has a few erect setae, mainly at the margins and the head has sparse, somewhat longer, erect, pale setae.. The pronotum is fringed with long, pale cilia at the base, anterior margin, and lateral margins and the disc is bare. The elytra are very sparsely covered with small, pale setae. Between the ribs, the elytra are somewhat paler.
