= Hamatoplectris rosettae =

Scientific classification
- Kingdom: Animalia
- Phylum: Arthropoda
- Class: Insecta
- Order: Coleoptera
- Suborder: Polyphaga
- Infraorder: Scarabaeiformia
- Family: Scarabaeidae
- Genus: Hamatoplectris
- Species: H. rosettae

Binomial name
- Hamatoplectris rosettae Frey, 1967

Species of beetle

Hamatoplectris rosettae is a species of beetle of the family Scarabaeidae. It is found in Brazil.

== Description ==
Adults reach a length of about 10 mm. They are slightly glossy and brown, with the head dark brown and the antennae somewhat lighter. The upper surface of the head is glabrous except for the vertex, which is covered with erect, short setae. The pronotum and elytra are sparsely, but uniformly, covered with somewhat erect, short setae.
