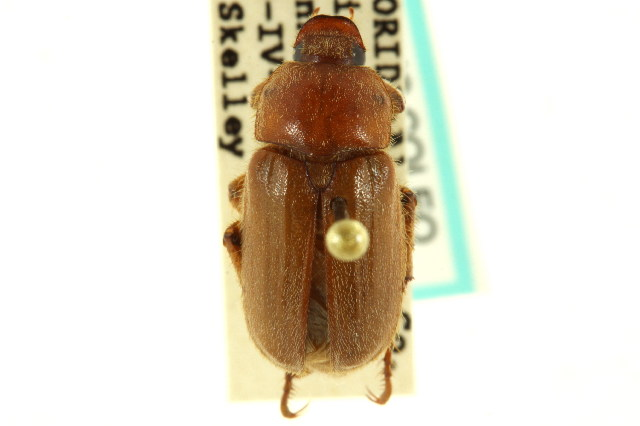

Scientific classification
- Kingdom: Animalia
- Phylum: Arthropoda
- Clade: Pancrustacea
- Class: Insecta
- Order: Coleoptera
- Suborder: Polyphaga
- Infraorder: Scarabaeiformia
- Family: Scarabaeidae
- Genus: Plectris
- Species: P. aliena

Binomial name
- Plectris aliena Chapin, 1934

= Plectris aliena =

Species of beetle

Plectris aliena is a species of scarab beetle in the family Scarabaeidae. It has been recorded from Argentina, Brazil (Mato Grosso do Sul), Paraguay, the United States (North Carolina, South Carolina) and Australia (New South Wales).

== Description ==
Adults reach a length of about 10.8-13.5 mm. They are castaneous to yellowish brown above, while the underside and legs are paler. The clypeus is coarsely and densely punctured. The surface of the pronotum is a little more finely and much more sparsely punctured than the clypeus. The elytra have four indistinct costae and there are fine and not very densely placed punctures on the surface, with a scale-like hair in each puncture.
