= Plectris parallela =

Scientific classification
- Kingdom: Animalia
- Phylum: Arthropoda
- Class: Insecta
- Order: Coleoptera
- Suborder: Polyphaga
- Infraorder: Scarabaeiformia
- Family: Scarabaeidae
- Genus: Plectris
- Species: P. parallela

Binomial name
- Plectris parallela Frey, 1976

Species of beetle

Plectris parallela is a species of beetle of the family Scarabaeidae. It is found in Brazil (Bahia).

== Description ==
Adults reach a length of about 8–9 mm. They have an elongate body. The upper and lower surfaces are brown and the head is blackish. The disc of the pronotum and part of the elytra are covered with erect, whitish-grey setae. The antennae are long and yellowish-brown.
