= Plectris crassesetosa =

Scientific classification
- Kingdom: Animalia
- Phylum: Arthropoda
- Class: Insecta
- Order: Coleoptera
- Suborder: Polyphaga
- Infraorder: Scarabaeiformia
- Family: Scarabaeidae
- Genus: Plectris
- Species: P. crassesetosa

Binomial name
- Plectris crassesetosa Frey, 1967

Species of beetle

Plectris crassesetosa is a species of beetle of the family Scarabaeidae. It is found in Brazil (Amazonas).

== Description ==
Adults reach a length of about 12–13 mm. They are blackish-brown and glossy. The clypeus is glabrous except for a few small, erect setae. Likewise, the frons and vertex are covered with thick, short, erect setae. The pronotum and elytra are covered with very thick setae, while bare but regular patches remain on both.
