= Plectris plaumanni =

Scientific classification
- Kingdom: Animalia
- Phylum: Arthropoda
- Class: Insecta
- Order: Coleoptera
- Suborder: Polyphaga
- Infraorder: Scarabaeiformia
- Family: Scarabaeidae
- Genus: Plectris
- Species: P. plaumanni

Binomial name
- Plectris plaumanni Frey, 1967

Species of beetle

Plectris plaumanni is a species of beetle of the family Scarabaeidae. It is found in Brazil (Paraná).

== Description ==
Adults reach a length of about 7.5 mm. They are brown, with a glossy clypeus. The underside and antennae are light brown, the head covered with short, light setae. The pronotum is very densely covered with light setae, but leave a bare, triangular patch opposite the scutellum. The scutellum is densely covered with white setae, with a bare anterior margin. The elytra are densely covered with light setae.
