= Plectris schneblei =

Scientific classification
- Kingdom: Animalia
- Phylum: Arthropoda
- Class: Insecta
- Order: Coleoptera
- Suborder: Polyphaga
- Infraorder: Scarabaeiformia
- Family: Scarabaeidae
- Genus: Plectris
- Species: P. schneblei

Binomial name
- Plectris schneblei Frey, 1967

Species of beetle

Plectris schneblei is a species of beetle of the family Scarabaeidae. It is found in Colombia.

== Description ==
Adults reach a length of about 12 mm. They are dark brown and somewhat glossy. The clypeus is glabrous, while the head has erect, medium-length setae at the posterior margin. The pronotum and elytra are covered with shorter, somewhat erect, light setae. The pronotum also has fairly regular bare patches and the ribs are interrupted by bare patches.
