= Plectris unidens =

Scientific classification
- Kingdom: Animalia
- Phylum: Arthropoda
- Class: Insecta
- Order: Coleoptera
- Suborder: Polyphaga
- Infraorder: Scarabaeiformia
- Family: Scarabaeidae
- Genus: Plectris
- Species: P. unidens

Binomial name
- Plectris unidens Frey, 1967

Species of beetle

Plectris unidens is a species of beetle of the family Scarabaeidae. It is found in Brazil (Pará).

== Description ==
Adults reach a length of about 10–12 mm. The upper and underside are brown, barely glossy, and densely covered with appressed light setae, which are much stronger and longer, somewhat irregularly arranged on the ribs, and mixed with setae.
