= Pseudoserica pilosa =

Scientific classification
- Kingdom: Animalia
- Phylum: Arthropoda
- Clade: Pancrustacea
- Class: Insecta
- Order: Coleoptera
- Suborder: Polyphaga
- Infraorder: Scarabaeiformia
- Family: Scarabaeidae
- Genus: Pseudoserica
- Species: P. pilosa

Binomial name
- Pseudoserica pilosa (Moser, 1918)

Synonyms
- Harpodactyla pilosa Moser, 1918

Species of beetle

Pseudoserica pilosa is a species of beetle of the family Scarabaeidae. It is found in Brazil (Rio de Janeiro).

== Description ==
Adults reach a length of about 7 mm. They are yellowish-brown and shiny, with grey hairs. The head is punctate, with the punctures covered with erect hairs. The antennae are yellowish-brown. The pronotum is extensively covered with fairly strong punctures, some with backward-pointing hairs and with some erect hairs. The elytra are punctate and not densely covered with hairs, but with a few erect hairs.
