= Ceraspis elegans =

Scientific classification
- Kingdom: Animalia
- Phylum: Arthropoda
- Clade: Pancrustacea
- Class: Insecta
- Order: Coleoptera
- Suborder: Polyphaga
- Infraorder: Scarabaeiformia
- Family: Scarabaeidae
- Genus: Ceraspis
- Species: C. elegans

Binomial name
- Ceraspis elegans Nonfried, 1891

Species of beetle

Ceraspis elegans is a species of scarab beetle in the subfamily Melolonthinae. It is known from Brazil (São Paulo) and Central America (Honduras).
