= Plectris devillei =

Scientific classification
- Kingdom: Animalia
- Phylum: Arthropoda
- Class: Insecta
- Order: Coleoptera
- Suborder: Polyphaga
- Infraorder: Scarabaeiformia
- Family: Scarabaeidae
- Genus: Plectris
- Species: P. devillei

Binomial name
- Plectris devillei Frey, 1967

Species of beetle

Plectris devillei is a species of beetle of the family Scarabaeidae. It is found in Ecuador.

== Description ==
Adults reach a length of about 15 mm. They are dark brown and somewhat glossy. The clypeus is glabrous, while the frons and vertex have some erect hairs. The pronotum is moderately densely and rather long uniformly pubescent. The elytra have regular bare patches on the dorsum, next to which the hairs are arranged in somewhat tufted clusters. The remaining parts of the elytra are moderately long and lightly pubescent and there are a few setate hairs on the ribs.
