= Plectris magdalenae =

Scientific classification
- Kingdom: Animalia
- Phylum: Arthropoda
- Class: Insecta
- Order: Coleoptera
- Suborder: Polyphaga
- Infraorder: Scarabaeiformia
- Family: Scarabaeidae
- Genus: Plectris
- Species: P. magdalenae

Binomial name
- Plectris magdalenae Frey, 1967

Species of beetle

Plectris magdalenae is a species of beetle of the family Scarabaeidae. It is found in Colombia.

== Description ==
Adults reach a length of about 10 mm. They are brown and moderately glossy, while the head is strongly glossy and blackish-brown. The underside and antennae are light brown and the clypeus is glabrous. The head is covered with a few erect, irregular setae. The pronotum and elytra are covered with short, appressed, scattered setae and there are glabrous patches on the ribs. The underside and pygidium are covered with somewhat longer, appressed setae.
