= Plectris maculifera =

Scientific classification
- Kingdom: Animalia
- Phylum: Arthropoda
- Class: Insecta
- Order: Coleoptera
- Suborder: Polyphaga
- Infraorder: Scarabaeiformia
- Family: Scarabaeidae
- Genus: Plectris
- Species: P. maculifera

Binomial name
- Plectris maculifera Frey, 1976

Species of beetle

Plectris maculifera is a species of beetle of the family Scarabaeidae. It is found in Brazil (Bahia).

== Description ==
Adults reach a length of about 9.5 mm. The upper and lower surfaces are dark, dull brown. The head is sparsely covered with yellowish hairs, while the pronotum has whitish, somewhat longer setae. On the elytra, there are four ribs, which show tufts of white hair at wide intervals. The antennae are dark brown.
