= Plectris amabilis =

Scientific classification
- Kingdom: Animalia
- Phylum: Arthropoda
- Class: Insecta
- Order: Coleoptera
- Suborder: Polyphaga
- Infraorder: Scarabaeiformia
- Family: Scarabaeidae
- Genus: Plectris
- Species: P. amabilis

Binomial name
- Plectris amabilis Frey, 1967

Species of beetle

Plectris amabilis is a species of beetle of the family Scarabaeidae. It is found in Venezuela.

== Description ==
Adults reach a length of about 10 mm. They are dark copper-coloured and shiny. The head has some erect, short setae, while the pronotum and elytra are covered with larger, appressed, long, very stiff and strong setae. The ribs on the elytra have regular bare patches, from which regular individual setae protrude. Between the ribs, the elytra are somewhat lighter in colour.
