= Alvarinus pallidipennis =

Scientific classification
- Kingdom: Animalia
- Phylum: Arthropoda
- Class: Insecta
- Order: Coleoptera
- Suborder: Polyphaga
- Infraorder: Scarabaeiformia
- Family: Scarabaeidae
- Genus: Alvarinus
- Species: A. pallidipennis

Binomial name
- Alvarinus pallidipennis Blanchard, 1850

Synonyms
- Plectris rectangula Frey, 1967

Species of beetle

Alvarinus pallidipennis is a species of beetle of the family Scarabaeidae. It is found in Brazil (Goiás).

== Description ==
Adults reach a length of about 9 mm. They have a dark brown, short, egg-shaped body. The underside, legs and antennae are light brown. The upper surface, including the clypeus, is densely covered with somewhat erect, rather short, pale setae that are more appressed on the elytra. On the head and pronotum, the setae are somewhat longer than on the elytra.
