= Plectris montana =

Scientific classification
- Kingdom: Animalia
- Phylum: Arthropoda
- Class: Insecta
- Order: Coleoptera
- Suborder: Polyphaga
- Infraorder: Scarabaeiformia
- Family: Scarabaeidae
- Genus: Plectris
- Species: P. montana

Binomial name
- Plectris montana Frey, 1967

Species of beetle

Plectris montana is a species of beetle of the family Scarabaeidae. It is found in Venezuela.

== Description ==
Adults reach a length of about 14 mm. They are almost dull and dark brown, with brown antennae. The clypeus has scattered medium-length setae, while the rest of the head is somewhat more densely covered with them. The pronotum is irregularly, not very densely covered with rather long setae. The elytra are moderately densely covered with shorter (only slightly erect on the ribs, but otherwise appressed), lighter setae, with bare patches on the ribs and some tufted setae in the apical area.
