= Plectris bilobata =

Scientific classification
- Kingdom: Animalia
- Phylum: Arthropoda
- Clade: Pancrustacea
- Class: Insecta
- Order: Coleoptera
- Suborder: Polyphaga
- Infraorder: Scarabaeiformia
- Family: Scarabaeidae
- Genus: Plectris
- Species: P. bilobata

Binomial name
- Plectris bilobata (Moser, 1921)

Synonyms
- Philochlaenia bilobata Moser, 1921; Plectris stoeckleini Frey, 1967

Species of beetle

Plectris bilobata is a species of beetle of the family Scarabaeidae. It is found in Bolivia.

== Description ==
Adults reach a length of about 13 mm. They are dark brown and glossy. The head is somewhat scattered but evenly covered with appressed white setae and the posterior margin of the head has a dense row of white setae. The pronotum and elytra are moderately densely covered with rather long, appressed, partly erect, fairly thick, light-coloured setae. The erect setae are particularly numerous on the ribs. The underside is covered with long, dense, appressed hairs.
