= Plectris baraudi =

Scientific classification
- Kingdom: Animalia
- Phylum: Arthropoda
- Class: Insecta
- Order: Coleoptera
- Suborder: Polyphaga
- Infraorder: Scarabaeiformia
- Family: Scarabaeidae
- Genus: Plectris
- Species: P. baraudi

Binomial name
- Plectris baraudi Frey, 1967

Species of beetle

Plectris baraudi is a species of beetle of the family Scarabaeidae. It is found in Ecuador.

== Description ==
Adults reach a length of about 16–18 mm. They are glossy and dark brown with a reddish sheen. The upper surface is smooth, except for a few short, erect setae on the back of the head and a few, barely visible short setae on the elytra. The thorax is densely covered with very long light brown hairs, while the ventral segments and legs are less densely covered with them. The pygidium is sparsely covered with medium-length erect hairs.
