= Plectris laevis =

Scientific classification
- Kingdom: Animalia
- Phylum: Arthropoda
- Class: Insecta
- Order: Coleoptera
- Suborder: Polyphaga
- Infraorder: Scarabaeiformia
- Family: Scarabaeidae
- Genus: Plectris
- Species: P. laevis

Binomial name
- Plectris laevis Frey, 1967

Species of beetle

Plectris laevis is a species of beetle of the family Scarabaeidae. It is found in Ecuador.

== Description ==
Adults reach a length of about 13 mm. The upper and lower surfaces are brown and moderately glossy, with light brown antennae. The upper surface and pygidium are smooth, except for a few hairs on the sutural stripe and at the base of the pronotum. The elytra and pronotal margins are very thinly fringed. The underside has rather long but sparse light hairs.
