= Plectris sparsecrinita =

Scientific classification
- Kingdom: Animalia
- Phylum: Arthropoda
- Class: Insecta
- Order: Coleoptera
- Suborder: Polyphaga
- Infraorder: Scarabaeiformia
- Family: Scarabaeidae
- Genus: Plectris
- Species: P. sparsecrinita

Binomial name
- Plectris sparsecrinita Frey, 1976

Species of beetle

Plectris sparsecrinita is a species of beetle of the family Scarabaeidae. It is found in Brazil (Santa Catarina).

== Description ==
Adults reach a length of about 8 mm. The upper and lower surfaces are very dark brown and strongly shiny. The head is rather densely covered with hairs. The pronotum and elytra with somewhat different, longer and shorter, rather fine, whitish hairs. The antennae are brown.
