= Plectris mandli =

Scientific classification
- Kingdom: Animalia
- Phylum: Arthropoda
- Class: Insecta
- Order: Coleoptera
- Suborder: Polyphaga
- Infraorder: Scarabaeiformia
- Family: Scarabaeidae
- Genus: Plectris
- Species: P. mandli

Binomial name
- Plectris mandli Frey, 1967

Species of beetle

Plectris mandli is a species of beetle of the family Scarabaeidae. It is found in Brazil (Espírito Santo).

== Description ==
Adults reach a length of about 19 mm. They are dark brown and dull. The clypeus has a few erect, shorter setae, while the rest of the head, pronotum, elytra and scutellum are evenly, but not very densely, covered with appressed, pale, medium-length setae. The underside is covered with fine, appressed hairs, which are considerably longer than the setae on the upper side.
