= Plectris lobaticollis =

Scientific classification
- Kingdom: Animalia
- Phylum: Arthropoda
- Class: Insecta
- Order: Coleoptera
- Suborder: Polyphaga
- Infraorder: Scarabaeiformia
- Family: Scarabaeidae
- Genus: Plectris
- Species: P. lobaticollis

Binomial name
- Plectris lobaticollis Frey, 1967

Species of beetle

Plectris lobaticollis is a species of beetle of the family Scarabaeidae. It is found in Brazil (São Paulo).

== Description ==
Adults reach a length of about 9–10 mm. They are dark brown and glossy (the pronotum slightly more glossy than the elytra). The upper surface is covered with appressed whitish setae, which are somewhat irregularly arranged on the head, while on the pronotum they are grouped together. On the elytra, they are arranged perfectly evenly between the ribs, and on the ribs they form smaller groups. The ribs have regular bare patches, which bear erect, rather strong setae. The underside is covered with appressed, fine white setae.
