= Plectris puberoides =

Scientific classification
- Kingdom: Animalia
- Phylum: Arthropoda
- Class: Insecta
- Order: Coleoptera
- Suborder: Polyphaga
- Infraorder: Scarabaeiformia
- Family: Scarabaeidae
- Genus: Plectris
- Species: P. puberoides

Binomial name
- Plectris puberoides Frey, 1976

Species of beetle

Plectris puberoides is a species of beetle of the family Scarabaeidae. It is found in Brazil (Bahia).

== Description ==
Adults reach a length of about 8 mm. The upper and lower surfaces are brown and barely shiny. The back of the head, pronotum, elytra and pygidium are densely covered with long setae. The underside is also densely covered with finer hairs, as are the legs. The antennae are light brown.
