= Plectris alboscutata =

Scientific classification
- Kingdom: Animalia
- Phylum: Arthropoda
- Class: Insecta
- Order: Coleoptera
- Suborder: Polyphaga
- Infraorder: Scarabaeiformia
- Family: Scarabaeidae
- Genus: Plectris
- Species: P. alboscutata

Binomial name
- Plectris alboscutata Frey, 1967

Species of beetle

Plectris alboscutata is a species of beetle of the family Scarabaeidae. It is found in Brazil (Minas Gerais).

== Description ==
Adults reach a length of about 14 mm. They are light brown. The upper surface is densely covered with rather short, appressed scales. The scutellum is pure white due to the accumulation of these scale-like setae. The pygidium and elytra are covered with only a few erect hairs at the apex. The underside is also setate like the elytra.
