= Plectris parcesetosa =

Scientific classification
- Kingdom: Animalia
- Phylum: Arthropoda
- Class: Insecta
- Order: Coleoptera
- Suborder: Polyphaga
- Infraorder: Scarabaeiformia
- Family: Scarabaeidae
- Genus: Plectris
- Species: P. parcesetosa

Binomial name
- Plectris parcesetosa Frey, 1976

Species of beetle

Plectris parcesetosa is a species of beetle of the family Scarabaeidae. It is found in Brazil (Bahia).

== Description ==
Adults reach a length of about 12 mm. The upper surface is blackish-brown and shiny, with the pygidium, underside and legs somewhat lighter brown. The back of the head, pronotum and elytra are very sparsely covered with very short setae, with some somewhat longer setae interspersed. The antennae are pale brown.
