= Plectris nuda =

Scientific classification
- Kingdom: Animalia
- Phylum: Arthropoda
- Class: Insecta
- Order: Coleoptera
- Suborder: Polyphaga
- Infraorder: Scarabaeiformia
- Family: Scarabaeidae
- Genus: Plectris
- Species: P. nuda

Binomial name
- Plectris nuda Frey, 1967

Species of beetle

Plectris nuda is a species of beetle of the family Scarabaeidae. It is found in Brazil (São Paulo).

== Description ==
Adults reach a length of about 12.5 mm. They are reddish-brown and glossy. The upper surface is glabrous, while the underside is densely covered with fine, longer hairs, while the abdominal segments have short, appressed hairs. The tip of the pygidium has somewhat longer, erect hairs.
