= Plectris villiersi =

Scientific classification
- Kingdom: Animalia
- Phylum: Arthropoda
- Class: Insecta
- Order: Coleoptera
- Suborder: Polyphaga
- Infraorder: Scarabaeiformia
- Family: Scarabaeidae
- Genus: Plectris
- Species: P. villiersi

Binomial name
- Plectris villiersi Frey, 1967

Species of beetle

Plectris villiersi is a species of beetle of the family Scarabaeidae. It is found in Ecuador.

== Description ==
Adults reach a length of about 21 mm. They are dark brown, with the pronotum dull and the elytra somewhat shiny, and the antennae light brown. The head is glabrous, except for the posterior margin of the vertex. The pronotum is rather sparsely, but regularly covered with short, erect, pale setae. The elytra have appressed pale setae, and bare patches on the ribs.
