= Plectris riveti =

Scientific classification
- Kingdom: Animalia
- Phylum: Arthropoda
- Class: Insecta
- Order: Coleoptera
- Suborder: Polyphaga
- Infraorder: Scarabaeiformia
- Family: Scarabaeidae
- Genus: Plectris
- Species: P. riveti

Binomial name
- Plectris riveti Frey, 1967

Species of beetle

Plectris riveti is a species of beetle of the family Scarabaeidae. It is found in Ecuador.

== Description ==
Adults reach a length of about 11 mm. They are brown, but the elytra, underside and antennae are lighter brown. The head is very sparsely covered with somewhat erect light setae. On the pronotum, these setae are scattered, and the elytra are very sparsely covered with them. The underside has rather long hairs, while the hairs on the thorax and pygidium are very long and much finer.
