= Plectris alvarengai =

Scientific classification
- Kingdom: Animalia
- Phylum: Arthropoda
- Class: Insecta
- Order: Coleoptera
- Suborder: Polyphaga
- Infraorder: Scarabaeiformia
- Family: Scarabaeidae
- Genus: Plectris
- Species: P. alvarengai

Binomial name
- Plectris alvarengai Frey, 1967

Species of beetle

Plectris alvarengai is a species of beetle of the family Scarabaeidae. It is found in Brazil (Espírito Santo).

== Description ==
Adults reach a length of about 12 mm. They are dark brown. Males are dull, while females are glossy. The upper surface is covered with appressed, rather strong, light-coloured setae, which are slightly longer on the pronotum and slightly shorter on the elytra. Among the normal setae are some somewhat stronger setae. These are irregularly distributed both on and beside the ribs.
