= Plectris bicolor =

Scientific classification
- Kingdom: Animalia
- Phylum: Arthropoda
- Class: Insecta
- Order: Coleoptera
- Suborder: Polyphaga
- Infraorder: Scarabaeiformia
- Family: Scarabaeidae
- Genus: Plectris
- Species: P. bicolor

Binomial name
- Plectris bicolor Frey, 1967

Species of beetle

Plectris bicolor is a species of beetle of the family Scarabaeidae. It is found in Brazil.

== Description ==
Adults reach a length of about 8.5 mm. The head and pronotum are black, the elytra reddish-brown and the legs and antennae dark brown. The head and pronotum are evenly but rather thinly covered with very long, erect setae. The setae are partly white, partly light brown.
