= Plectris balthasari =

Scientific classification
- Kingdom: Animalia
- Phylum: Arthropoda
- Class: Insecta
- Order: Coleoptera
- Suborder: Polyphaga
- Infraorder: Scarabaeiformia
- Family: Scarabaeidae
- Genus: Plectris
- Species: P. balthasari

Binomial name
- Plectris balthasari Frey, 1967

Species of beetle

Plectris balthasari is a species of beetle of the family Scarabaeidae. It is found in Brazil (Espírito Santo).

== Description ==
Adults reach a length of about 11 mm. They are dark brown, with the pronotum moderately glossy and the elytra dull. The clypeus is covered with erect, short setae, while the rest of the head, the pronotum and the elytra are quite densely and very uniformly covered with longer, erect setae (on the pronotum and head) and shorter, appressed, pale setae on the elytra.
