= Plectris calcarata =

Scientific classification
- Kingdom: Animalia
- Phylum: Arthropoda
- Class: Insecta
- Order: Coleoptera
- Suborder: Polyphaga
- Infraorder: Scarabaeiformia
- Family: Scarabaeidae
- Genus: Plectris
- Species: P. calcarata

Binomial name
- Plectris calcarata Frey, 1967

Species of beetle

Plectris calcarata is a species of beetle of the family Scarabaeidae. It is found in Brazil.

== Description ==
Adults reach a length of about 15–17 mm. They are dark brown and dull. The clypeus has thin pale setae, while the vertex and frons, pronotum and elytra are densely covered with long somewhat erect, pale setae. The setae are interspersed with numerous considerably smaller, but not much stronger, setae, which are particularly pronounced on the pygidium.
