= Plectris albovittata =

Scientific classification
- Kingdom: Animalia
- Phylum: Arthropoda
- Class: Insecta
- Order: Coleoptera
- Suborder: Polyphaga
- Infraorder: Scarabaeiformia
- Family: Scarabaeidae
- Genus: Plectris
- Species: P. albovittata

Binomial name
- Plectris albovittata Frey, 1967

Synonyms
- Plectris albovittatus

Species of beetle

Plectris albovittata is a species of beetle of the family Scarabaeidae. It is found in Brazil (Santa Catarina).

== Description ==
Adults reach a length of about 12 mm. They are brown. The upper and lower surfaces (including the scutellum) are densely covered with somewhat erect, and especially on the pronotum also erect, longer whitish setae. The setae on the pronotum are somewhat longer. On the thorax and at the tip of the pygidium, the pubescence is even longer and denser. The pygidium also has a tuft of yellowish, erect hairs. The pronotum has a median stripe, along which the bristles are somewhat denser. The head, like the elytra, is covered with setae.
