= Plectris tenueclava =

Scientific classification
- Kingdom: Animalia
- Phylum: Arthropoda
- Class: Insecta
- Order: Coleoptera
- Suborder: Polyphaga
- Infraorder: Scarabaeiformia
- Family: Scarabaeidae
- Genus: Plectris
- Species: P. tenueclava

Binomial name
- Plectris tenueclava Frey, 1976

Species of beetle

Plectris tenueclava is a species of beetle of the family Scarabaeidae. It is found in Brazil (Bahia).

== Description ==
Adults reach a length of about 10 mm. The upper surface is brown and strongly shiny. The pronotum is sometimes darker, as is the lateral margin of the elytra. The underside is brown. The head is covered with white setae and the pronotal margin also has white hairs. The elytra are sparsely covered with white setae. The antennae are light brown and very long.
