= Plectris vicina =

Scientific classification
- Kingdom: Animalia
- Phylum: Arthropoda
- Class: Insecta
- Order: Coleoptera
- Suborder: Polyphaga
- Infraorder: Scarabaeiformia
- Family: Scarabaeidae
- Genus: Plectris
- Species: P. vicina

Binomial name
- Plectris vicina Frey, 1967

Species of beetle

Plectris vicina is a species of beetle of the family Scarabaeidae. It is found in Brazil.

== Description ==
Adults reach a length of about 14 mm. They are dark brown and dull. The vertex of the head and pronotum are very densely covered, while the elytra, scutellum, underside, and pygidium are densely covered with appressed pale setae. On the clypeus and frons, the pubescence is sparser and somewhat shorter, but mostly erect.
