= Plectris kochi =

Scientific classification
- Kingdom: Animalia
- Phylum: Arthropoda
- Class: Insecta
- Order: Coleoptera
- Suborder: Polyphaga
- Infraorder: Scarabaeiformia
- Family: Scarabaeidae
- Genus: Plectris
- Species: P. kochi

Binomial name
- Plectris kochi Frey, 1967

Species of beetle

Plectris kochi is a species of beetle of the family Scarabaeidae. It is found in Peru.

== Description ==
Adults reach a length of about 18 mm. They are somewhat glossy and brown, while the elytra are reddish-brown and the pronotum and head somewhat dark brown. The clypeus is glabrous and the head has a few short, erect setae around the eyes and on the posterior margin. The pronotum and elytra are very sparsely covered with short, yellowish, appressed setae, which are somewhat denser only on the ribs and form a tufted transverse stripe in the apical area. The thorax is covered with very long hairs.
