= Plectris ambigua =

Scientific classification
- Kingdom: Animalia
- Phylum: Arthropoda
- Class: Insecta
- Order: Coleoptera
- Suborder: Polyphaga
- Infraorder: Scarabaeiformia
- Family: Scarabaeidae
- Genus: Plectris
- Species: P. ambigua

Binomial name
- Plectris ambigua Frey, 1967

Species of beetle

Plectris ambigua is a species of beetle of the family Scarabaeidae. It is found in Brazil (Rio de Janeiro).

== Description ==
Adults reach a length of about 11 mm. They are dark brown and somewhat glossy. The clypeus is sparsely, and the head is not densely covered with shorter, somewhat erect setae. The pronotum and elytra are very densely covered with longer, yellowish setae, which are somewhat erect on the pronotum, while more appressed on the elytra. The setae are somewhat denser on the elytra than on the pronotum.
