= Plectris aeneofusca =

Scientific classification
- Kingdom: Animalia
- Phylum: Arthropoda
- Clade: Pancrustacea
- Class: Insecta
- Order: Coleoptera
- Suborder: Polyphaga
- Infraorder: Scarabaeiformia
- Family: Scarabaeidae
- Genus: Plectris
- Species: P. aeneofusca

Binomial name
- Plectris aeneofusca (Moser, 1918)

Synonyms
- Philochlaenia aeneofusca Moser, 1918

Species of beetle

Plectris aeneofusca is a species of beetle of the family Scarabaeidae. It is found in Ecuador.

== Description ==
Adults reach a length of about 20–22 mm. They are brown, with the pygidium and abdomen green. The whole body has a strong metallic sheen. The head is coarsely punctate and the frons is bristled posteriorly. The antennae are reddish-brown. The pronotum is extensively covered with yellowish-haired punctures and the elytra have numerous small spots of yellowish hairs. Interspersed among these are occasional longer, erect hairs.
