= Plectris variipennis =

Scientific classification
- Kingdom: Animalia
- Phylum: Arthropoda
- Clade: Pancrustacea
- Class: Insecta
- Order: Coleoptera
- Suborder: Polyphaga
- Infraorder: Scarabaeiformia
- Family: Scarabaeidae
- Genus: Plectris
- Species: P. variipennis

Binomial name
- Plectris variipennis Moser, 1921

Synonyms
- Plectris variipennis var. stupida Frey, 1967; Philochlaenia brevis Burmeister, 1855

Species of beetle

Plectris variipennis is a species of beetle of the family Scarabaeidae. It is found in Brazil (Santa Catarina, São Paulo).

== Description ==
Adults reach a length of about 8–9 mm. They are brown and slightly glossy, with light brown antennae. The upper surface is moderately densely and rather finely covered with light and short hairs, only on the pronotum somewhat longer, otherwise rather fine. The elytra have regular bare patches on the ribs, which bear some erect hairs. The greater part of the elytra, however, is without setae, which are only somewhat more frequent at the margin. The underside is densely covered with appressed setae and the thorax has somewhat longer appressed hairs.
