= Plectris zischkaella =

Scientific classification
- Kingdom: Animalia
- Phylum: Arthropoda
- Class: Insecta
- Order: Coleoptera
- Suborder: Polyphaga
- Infraorder: Scarabaeiformia
- Family: Scarabaeidae
- Genus: Plectris
- Species: P. zischkaella

Binomial name
- Plectris zischkaella Frey, 1967

Species of beetle

Plectris zischkaella is a species of beetle of the family Scarabaeidae. It is found in Bolivia.

== Description ==
Adults reach a length of about 16–18 mm. They are dull and dark brown, while the elytra are somewhat reddish-brown. The head is sparsely covered with erect, moderately long setae and the pronotum is covered with somewhat erect, rather long setae, as well as some very long, rather dense, but not very thick hairs (especially on the disc).
