= Plectris splendida =

Scientific classification
- Kingdom: Animalia
- Phylum: Arthropoda
- Class: Insecta
- Order: Coleoptera
- Suborder: Polyphaga
- Infraorder: Scarabaeiformia
- Family: Scarabaeidae
- Genus: Plectris
- Species: P. splendida

Binomial name
- Plectris splendida Frey, 1967

Species of beetle

Plectris splendida is a species of beetle of the family Scarabaeidae. It is found in Venezuela.

== Description ==
Adults reach a length of about 11–13 mm. They are reddish-brown, with the upper and lower surfaces strongly glossy, and the head and pronotum almost glabrous, although there are a few fine, erect hairs on the head. The pronotum is pale at the base and anterior margin, but not very densely fringed. There are also some longer, erect hairs on the anterior margin. The elytra are covered with short, sparse, appressed setae, and the ribs have regular bare patches.
