= Plectris subcarinata =

Scientific classification
- Kingdom: Animalia
- Phylum: Arthropoda
- Class: Insecta
- Order: Coleoptera
- Suborder: Polyphaga
- Infraorder: Scarabaeiformia
- Family: Scarabaeidae
- Genus: Plectris
- Species: P. subcarinata

Binomial name
- Plectris subcarinata Frey, 1967

Species of beetle

Plectris subcarinata is a species of beetle of the family Scarabaeidae. It is found in Brazil (Santa Catarina).

== Description ==
Adults reach a length of about 14–15 mm. They are brown and slightly glossy. The upper and lower surfaces are very densely covered with somewhat protruding light setae. These setae are mixed with not fairly short hairs, which are particularly numerous (and longer) on the pygidium. The hairs on the thorax are also somewhat longer.
