= Plectris dimorpha =

Scientific classification
- Kingdom: Animalia
- Phylum: Arthropoda
- Class: Insecta
- Order: Coleoptera
- Suborder: Polyphaga
- Infraorder: Scarabaeiformia
- Family: Scarabaeidae
- Genus: Plectris
- Species: P. dimorpha

Binomial name
- Plectris dimorpha Frey, 1976

Species of beetle

Plectris dimorpha is a species of beetle of the family Scarabaeidae. It is found in Brazil (Bahia).

== Description ==
Adults reach a length of about 10–11 mm. The upper and lower surfaces are dark brown and dull in males and moderately shiny in females. The head and pronotum have longer, while the scutellum and elytra have shorter, whitish, bristle-like hairs.
