= Plectris kulzeri =

Scientific classification
- Kingdom: Animalia
- Phylum: Arthropoda
- Class: Insecta
- Order: Coleoptera
- Suborder: Polyphaga
- Infraorder: Scarabaeiformia
- Family: Scarabaeidae
- Genus: Plectris
- Species: P. kulzeri

Binomial name
- Plectris kulzeri Frey, 1967

Species of beetle

Plectris kulzeri is a species of beetle of the family Scarabaeidae. It is found in Bolivia and Colombia.

== Description ==
Adults reach a length of about 13 mm. They are brown, almost dull, with the clypeus and pronotum somewhat longer, and the elytra shorter, light and evenly pubescent. There are bristly hairs on the pronotum, and also (but only a few) on the elytra, on the lateral margins and at the base of the elytra.
