= Hamatoplectris =

Scientific classification
- Kingdom: Animalia
- Phylum: Arthropoda
- Class: Insecta
- Order: Coleoptera
- Suborder: Polyphaga
- Infraorder: Scarabaeiformia
- Family: Scarabaeidae
- Subfamily: Melolonthinae
- Tribe: Macrodactylini
- Genus: Hamatoplectris; Frey, 1967

Genus of leaf beetles

Hamatoplectris is a genus of beetles belonging to the family Scarabaeidae.

== Species ==
- Hamatoplectris caracana Frey, 1969
- Hamatoplectris rosettae Frey, 1967
- Hamatoplectris spinifer Frey, 1967
