= Plectris schereri =

Scientific classification
- Kingdom: Animalia
- Phylum: Arthropoda
- Class: Insecta
- Order: Coleoptera
- Suborder: Polyphaga
- Infraorder: Scarabaeiformia
- Family: Scarabaeidae
- Genus: Plectris
- Species: P. schereri

Binomial name
- Plectris schereri Frey, 1967

Species of beetle

Plectris schereri is a species of beetle of the family Scarabaeidae. It is found in Bolivia.

== Description ==
Adults reach a length of about 14–15 mm. They are brown and somewhat glossy. The upper and lower surfaces (including the scutellum) are densely covered with light-coloured hairs. The clypeus is glabrous and there are numerous hairs on the pygidium, but no setae. The setae on the pronotum and elytra are only slightly longer than the normal setae.
