= Plectris sparsepilosa =

Scientific classification
- Kingdom: Animalia
- Phylum: Arthropoda
- Class: Insecta
- Order: Coleoptera
- Suborder: Polyphaga
- Infraorder: Scarabaeiformia
- Family: Scarabaeidae
- Genus: Plectris
- Species: P. sparsepilosa

Binomial name
- Plectris sparsepilosa Frey, 1967

Species of beetle

Plectris sparsepilosa is a species of beetle of the family Scarabaeidae. It is found in Venezuela.

== Description ==
Adults reach a length of about 10 mm. They are shiny and dark brown, with the head somewhat darker with a reddish sheen. The upper surface is very sparsely and irregularly covered with fine, erect, thin setae. The underside and the pygidium are considerably more densely covered with fine, appressed, and light-coloured hairs. The hairs are longer on the pygidium and thorax, and somewhat erect on the pygidium.
