= Pseudoserica rugipennis =

Scientific classification
- Kingdom: Animalia
- Phylum: Arthropoda
- Clade: Pancrustacea
- Class: Insecta
- Order: Coleoptera
- Suborder: Polyphaga
- Infraorder: Scarabaeiformia
- Family: Scarabaeidae
- Genus: Pseudoserica
- Species: P. rugipennis

Binomial name
- Pseudoserica rugipennis (Moser, 1918)

Synonyms
- Harpodactyla rugipennis Moser, 1918

Species of beetle

Pseudoserica rugipennis is a species of beetle of the family Scarabaeidae. It is found in Brazil (Santa Catarina).

== Description ==
Adults reach a length of about 8 mm. They are brown and shiny, with a greenish metallic sheen. The head is moderately densely punctate and the antennae are brown. The pronotum is widely punctate and has some hairs, especially at the base and beside the lateral margins. The elytra are dentate, wrinkled-punctate and widely covered with grey hairs.
