= Plectris lindneri =

Scientific classification
- Kingdom: Animalia
- Phylum: Arthropoda
- Class: Insecta
- Order: Coleoptera
- Suborder: Polyphaga
- Infraorder: Scarabaeiformia
- Family: Scarabaeidae
- Genus: Plectris
- Species: P. lindneri

Binomial name
- Plectris lindneri Frey, 1967

Species of beetle

Plectris lindneri is a species of beetle of the family Scarabaeidae. It is found in Paraguay.

== Description ==
Adults reach a length of about 12–13 mm. They are light reddish-brown, with the clypeus somewhat darker. The upper surface is sparsely covered with short, appressed white setae. Only on the back of the head, the lateral margins of the pronotum, and the posterior margin of the elytra are the setae somewhat denser. The disc of the pronotum is almost bare, the underside and pygidium are densely covered with appressed, much longer setae.
