= Plectris muscula =

Scientific classification
- Kingdom: Animalia
- Phylum: Arthropoda
- Class: Insecta
- Order: Coleoptera
- Suborder: Polyphaga
- Infraorder: Scarabaeiformia
- Family: Scarabaeidae
- Genus: Plectris
- Species: P. muscula

Binomial name
- Plectris muscula Frey, 1967

Species of beetle

Plectris muscula is a species of beetle of the family Scarabaeidae. It is found in Guyana.

== Description ==
Adults reach a length of about 8 mm. They are dark brown and slightly glossy. The clypeus is rather short, moderately densely pubescent and the head, pronotum and elytra are rather densely covered with very long, mostly erect setae, which are mixed with even longer, but similar, setae. The underside is long and densely pubescent, and the pygidium is pubescent like the pronotum.
