= Plectris pinsdorfi =

Scientific classification
- Kingdom: Animalia
- Phylum: Arthropoda
- Class: Insecta
- Order: Coleoptera
- Suborder: Polyphaga
- Infraorder: Scarabaeiformia
- Family: Scarabaeidae
- Genus: Plectris
- Species: P. pinsdorfi

Binomial name
- Plectris pinsdorfi Frey, 1967

Species of beetle

Plectris pinsdorfi is a species of beetle of the family Scarabaeidae. It is found in Brazil (Espírito Santo).

== Description ==
Adults reach a length of about 10 mm. They are dark brown and slightly glossy. The upper surface is moderately densely covered with appressed, whitish, shorter setae. The underside and the pygidium are covered with somewhat finer and more densely appressed hairs. There are a few erect setae on the tip of the pygidium.
