= Plectris densehirsuta =

Scientific classification
- Kingdom: Animalia
- Phylum: Arthropoda
- Class: Insecta
- Order: Coleoptera
- Suborder: Polyphaga
- Infraorder: Scarabaeiformia
- Family: Scarabaeidae
- Genus: Plectris
- Species: P. densehirsuta

Binomial name
- Plectris densehirsuta Frey, 1967

Species of beetle

Plectris densehirsuta is a species of beetle of the family Scarabaeidae. It is found in Uruguay.

== Description ==
Adults reach a length of about 11–12 mm. They are brown and dull. The entire upper and lower surfaces as well as the clypeus (which is only sparsely and thinly pubescent) are very densely and quite finely pubescent. The pubescence on the pronotum and scutellum is even denser than on the elytra and the pubescence on the thorax is very long, dense and woolly.
