= Pseudoserica aenescens =

Scientific classification
- Kingdom: Animalia
- Phylum: Arthropoda
- Clade: Pancrustacea
- Class: Insecta
- Order: Coleoptera
- Suborder: Polyphaga
- Infraorder: Scarabaeiformia
- Family: Scarabaeidae
- Genus: Pseudoserica
- Species: P. aenescens

Binomial name
- Pseudoserica aenescens (Moser, 1918)

Synonyms
- Harpodactyla aenescens Moser, 1918

Species of beetle

Pseudoserica aenescens is a species of beetle of the family Scarabaeidae. It is found in Brazil (Espírito Santo).

== Description ==
Adults reach a length of about 6.5 mm. They are yellowish-brown with a greenish metallic sheen. The elytra are dark brown spotted and the upper surface is sparsely covered with whitish setae. The head is strongly punctured and the antennae are yellowish-brown. The pronotum is quite densely covered with strong punctures, with grey setae. The elytra have punctation and are rather sparsely and irregularly covered with white setae.
