= Plectris orocuensis =

Scientific classification
- Kingdom: Animalia
- Phylum: Arthropoda
- Class: Insecta
- Order: Coleoptera
- Suborder: Polyphaga
- Infraorder: Scarabaeiformia
- Family: Scarabaeidae
- Genus: Plectris
- Species: P. orocuensis

Binomial name
- Plectris orocuensis Frey, 1967

Species of beetle

Plectris orocuensis is a species of beetle of the family Scarabaeidae. It is found in Colombia.

== Description ==
Adults reach a length of about 11–13 mm. They are reddish-brown. The upper surface is sparsely covered with very thin, short setae. The thorax is covered with long, light-coloured hairs and the pygidium has somewhat erect, long hairs. The pronotum and elytral margins are fringed with cilia. The scutellum is also very sparsely haired with a smooth midline.
