= Plectris ophthalmica =

Scientific classification
- Kingdom: Animalia
- Phylum: Arthropoda
- Class: Insecta
- Order: Coleoptera
- Suborder: Polyphaga
- Infraorder: Scarabaeiformia
- Family: Scarabaeidae
- Genus: Plectris
- Species: P. ophthalmica

Binomial name
- Plectris ophthalmica Frey, 1967

Synonyms
- Plectris ophtalmica

Species of beetle

Plectris ophthalmica is a species of beetle of the family Scarabaeidae. It is found in Amazonas.

== Description ==
Adults reach a length of about 12 mm. The upper and lower surfaces are brown, barely glossy, and densely covered with hairs of medium length, which are somewhat longer on the thorax, the pygidium, pronotum and the posterior part of the head. The pubescence is only sparsely interspersed with setae, which are found on the pygidium and sporadically on the elytral margins.
