= Plectris depressicollis =

Scientific classification
- Kingdom: Animalia
- Phylum: Arthropoda
- Class: Insecta
- Order: Coleoptera
- Suborder: Polyphaga
- Infraorder: Scarabaeiformia
- Family: Scarabaeidae
- Genus: Plectris
- Species: P. depressicollis

Binomial name
- Plectris depressicollis Frey, 1967

Species of beetle

Plectris depressicollis is a species of beetle of the family Scarabaeidae. It is found in Brazil (Minas Gerais).

== Description ==
Adults reach a length of about 12–13 mm. They are dark brown and somewhat glossy, but the underside is brown. The upper surface is sparsely, but evenly covered with extremely short, appressed pale setae. Only on the vertex and frons are these setae somewhat denser and longer. The underside and pygidium are densely covered with somewhat longer, the thorax with rather long, appressed pale setae.
