= Plectris pusio =

Scientific classification
- Kingdom: Animalia
- Phylum: Arthropoda
- Class: Insecta
- Order: Coleoptera
- Suborder: Polyphaga
- Infraorder: Scarabaeiformia
- Family: Scarabaeidae
- Genus: Plectris
- Species: P. pusio

Binomial name
- Plectris pusio Frey, 1967

Species of beetle

Plectris pusio is a species of beetle of the family Scarabaeidae. It is found in Brazil.

== Description ==
Adults reach a length of about 7.5 mm. They are light reddish-brown. The upper surface is sparsely covered with short, appressed setae. On the elytra, some stronger, erect scale-like setae are found, especially on the lateral margins. The underside is covered with short, fine, appressed setae.
