= Plectris imitans =

Scientific classification
- Kingdom: Animalia
- Phylum: Arthropoda
- Class: Insecta
- Order: Coleoptera
- Suborder: Polyphaga
- Infraorder: Scarabaeiformia
- Family: Scarabaeidae
- Genus: Plectris
- Species: P. imitans

Binomial name
- Plectris imitans Frey, 1967

Species of beetle

Plectris imitans is a species of beetle of the family Scarabaeidae. It is found in Colombia.

== Description ==
Adults reach a length of about 17 mm. They are brown, with the pronotum, scutellum, and head somewhat darker, and the elytra with a metallic sheen. The clypeus is glabrous, while the rest of the head has a few short, erect setae at the eye margin and posterior margin. The pronotum is sparsely covered with very short, appressed, and somewhat longer, erect setae. The elytra are also sparsely but regularly covered with short setae. On the ribs and lateral margin, however, very strong and much longer setae are present.
