= Plectris spatulata =

Scientific classification
- Kingdom: Animalia
- Phylum: Arthropoda
- Class: Insecta
- Order: Coleoptera
- Suborder: Polyphaga
- Infraorder: Scarabaeiformia
- Family: Scarabaeidae
- Genus: Plectris
- Species: P. spatulata

Binomial name
- Plectris spatulata Frey, 1967

Species of beetle

Plectris spatulata is a species of beetle of the family Scarabaeidae. It is found in Brazil (Santa Catarina).

== Description ==
Adults reach a length of about 15–17 mm. They are dark brown and dull. The head, pronotum and elytra are not very densely covered with somewhat shorter, light-coloured, more or less appressed setae. On the posterior margin of the head, on the scutellum, the pygidium, and the underside, the pubescence is considerably denser and mostly appressed. The thorax is covered with long, shaggy hairs. On the elytra, the pronotum, and especially on the pygidium, there are individual, considerably stronger, longer setae.
