= Plectris paraensis =

Scientific classification
- Kingdom: Animalia
- Phylum: Arthropoda
- Class: Insecta
- Order: Coleoptera
- Suborder: Polyphaga
- Infraorder: Scarabaeiformia
- Family: Scarabaeidae
- Genus: Plectris
- Species: P. paraensis

Binomial name
- Plectris paraensis Frey, 1967

Species of beetle

Plectris paraensis is a species of beetle of the family Scarabaeidae. It is found in Brazil (Pará) and Guyana.

== Description ==
Adults reach a length of about 9–10 mm. They are dark brown, with the elytra dull and the pronotum shiny. The clypeus has some erect setae, and the head has somewhat erect, longer setae. The pronotum is covered with rather long, partly erect, partly appressed setae. The covering is not very dense and leaves some bare areas. The elytra are appressed with shorter setae, not very densely, but evenly covered. On the ribs and also on the lateral margin are some stronger, erect scale-like setae.
