= Plectris nitidicollis =

Scientific classification
- Kingdom: Animalia
- Phylum: Arthropoda
- Class: Insecta
- Order: Coleoptera
- Suborder: Polyphaga
- Infraorder: Scarabaeiformia
- Family: Scarabaeidae
- Genus: Plectris
- Species: P. nitidicollis

Binomial name
- Plectris nitidicollis Frey, 1967

Species of beetle

Plectris nitidicollis is a species of beetle of the family Scarabaeidae. It is found in Brazil (Minas Gerais, Paraná, São Paulo).

== Description ==
Adults reach a length of about 9–10 mm. They are reddish-brown, but the ventral segments and pygidium are yellowish-brown. The pronotum and head strongly glossy and the elytra moderately glossy. The pronotum is sparsely covered with whitish, medium-length, appressed setae. These are somewhat denser on the elytra. The thorax is yellowish.
