= Plectris obtusioides =

Scientific classification
- Kingdom: Animalia
- Phylum: Arthropoda
- Class: Insecta
- Order: Coleoptera
- Suborder: Polyphaga
- Infraorder: Scarabaeiformia
- Family: Scarabaeidae
- Genus: Plectris
- Species: P. obtusioides

Binomial name
- Plectris obtusioides Frey, 1967

Species of beetle

Plectris obtusioides is a species of beetle of the family Scarabaeidae. It is found in Brazil (Espírito Santo, São Paulo).

== Description ==
Adults reach a length of about 10 mm. They are dark brown and dull. The clypeus has a few short, erect setae, while the rest of the head, pronotum, elytra and scutellum are evenly (but not very densely) covered with rather short, appressed setae. The underside is rather densely covered with fine, appressed, light hairs.
