= Plectris panamaensis =

Scientific classification
- Kingdom: Animalia
- Phylum: Arthropoda
- Class: Insecta
- Order: Coleoptera
- Suborder: Polyphaga
- Infraorder: Scarabaeiformia
- Family: Scarabaeidae
- Genus: Plectris
- Species: P. panamaensis

Binomial name
- Plectris panamaensis Frey, 1967

Species of beetle

Plectris panamaensis is a species of beetle of the family Scarabaeidae. It is found in Panama.

== Description ==
Adults reach a length of about 13 mm. They are brown and somewhat glossy, the head and pronotum with a bronze sheen. The antennae are light brown and the head has very scattered setae. The pronotum and elytra are covered with very scattered, erect setae, some very short, some somewhat longer and bristle-like.
