= Plectris ocularis =

Scientific classification
- Kingdom: Animalia
- Phylum: Arthropoda
- Class: Insecta
- Order: Coleoptera
- Suborder: Polyphaga
- Infraorder: Scarabaeiformia
- Family: Scarabaeidae
- Genus: Plectris
- Species: P. ocularis

Binomial name
- Plectris ocularis Frey, 1967

Species of beetle

Plectris ocularis is a species of beetle of the family Scarabaeidae. It is found in Brazil.

== Description ==
Adults reach a length of about 7 mm. They are brown and moderately glossy. The upper and lower surfaces have appressed, thin, somewhat scattered and rather short light grey hairs, interspersed with individual longer hairs, which are also located on the tip of the pygidium.
