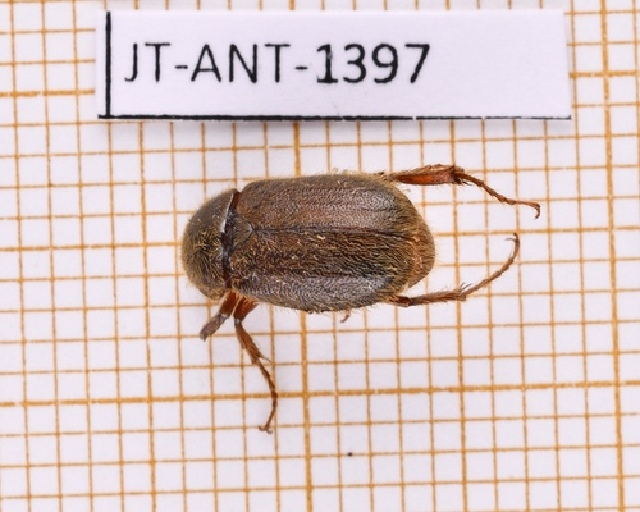

Scientific classification
- Kingdom: Animalia
- Phylum: Arthropoda
- Class: Insecta
- Order: Coleoptera
- Suborder: Polyphaga
- Infraorder: Scarabaeiformia
- Family: Scarabaeidae
- Genus: Plectris
- Species: P. martinicensis

Binomial name
- Plectris martinicensis Chalumeau, 1982

= Plectris martinicensis =

Species of beetle

Plectris martinicensis is a species of beetle of the family Scarabaeidae. It is found on Martinique.
