= Plectris hellmichi =

Scientific classification
- Kingdom: Animalia
- Phylum: Arthropoda
- Class: Insecta
- Order: Coleoptera
- Suborder: Polyphaga
- Infraorder: Scarabaeiformia
- Family: Scarabaeidae
- Genus: Plectris
- Species: P. hellmichi

Binomial name
- Plectris hellmichi Frey, 1967

Species of beetle

Plectris hellmichi is a species of beetle of the family Scarabaeidae. It is found in Colombia.

== Description ==
Adults reach a length of about 13–14 mm. They are shiny and brown, with the head and pygidium somewhat darker. The head has long and rather fine erect hairs. The pronotum has rather long erect, light-coloured hairs and the elytra have very scattered, rather short hairs, only on the ribs with some longer setae. The pygidium has long setae and the thorax is densely covered with very long hairs. The underside also has long, fine and rather dense light hairs.
