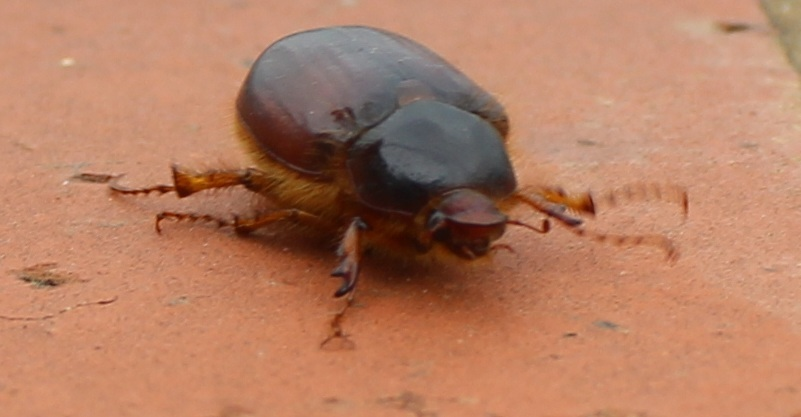
- Clavipalpus ursinus

Scientific classification
- Kingdom: Animalia
- Phylum: Arthropoda
- Class: Insecta
- Order: Coleoptera
- Suborder: Polyphaga
- Infraorder: Scarabaeiformia
- Family: Scarabaeidae
- Subfamily: Melolonthinae
- Tribe: Macrodactylini; Kirby, 1837

= Macrodactylini =

Tribe of beetles

Macrodactylini is a tribe of May beetles and junebugs in the family Scarabaeidae. There are at least 46 genera and over a thousand species described in the tribe Macrodactylini.

== Genera ==
The following genera are recognised in the tribe Macrodactylini:

- Agaocnemis Moser, 1918
- Alvarinus Blanchard, 1850
- Ampliodactylus Smith, 2008
- Ancistrosoma Curtis, 1835
- Anomonyx Saylor, 1940
- Astaenoplia Martínez, 1957
- Barybas Blanchard, 1850
- Byrasba Harold, 1869
- Calodactylus Blanchard, 1850
- Canestera Saylor, 1938
- Ceraspis LePeletier de Saint-Fargeau & Audinet-Serville, 1828
- Ceratolontha Arrow, 1948
- Chariodactylus Moser, 1919
- Chariodema Blanchard, 1850
- Clavipalpus Laporte, 1832
- Compsodactylus Fuhrmann, 2012
- Dasyus LePeletier de Saint-Fargeau & Audinet-Serville, 1828
- Dicrania LePeletier de Saint-Fargeau & Audinet-Serville, 1828
- Euryaspis Blanchard, 1851
- Extenuoptyophis Smith & Mondaca 2015
- Faula Blanchard, 1850
- Hamatoplectris Frey, 1967
- Hieritis Burmeister, 1855
- Isonychus Mannerheim, 1829
- Insimuloissacaris Smith & Mondaca, 2015
- Issacaris Fairmaire, 1889
- Junkia Dalla Torre, 1913
- Macrodactylus Dejean, 1821 (rose chafers)
- Mallotarsus Blanchard, 1850
- Manodactylus Moser, 1919
- Manopus Conte de Castelnau, 1840
- Modialis Fairmaire & Germain, 1860
- Neuquenodactylus Smith & Mondaca, 2015
- Oedichira Burmeister, 1855
- Paulosawaya Martínez & d’Andretta, 1956
- Pectinosoma Arrow, 1913
- Philochloenia Dejean, 1833
- Phytholaema Blanchard, 1851
- Plectris LePeletier de Saint–Fargeau & Audinet–Serville, 1828
- Pristerophora Harold, 1869
- Pseudodicrania Gutiérrez, 1950
- Pseudopectinosoma Katovich, 2011
- Pseudoserica Guérin–Méneville, 1838
- Ptyophis Redtenbacher, 1868
- Rhinaspis Perty, 1833
- Schizochelus Blanchard, 1850
