= Plectris ornaticeps =

Scientific classification
- Kingdom: Animalia
- Phylum: Arthropoda
- Class: Insecta
- Order: Coleoptera
- Suborder: Polyphaga
- Infraorder: Scarabaeiformia
- Family: Scarabaeidae
- Genus: Plectris
- Species: P. ornaticeps

Binomial name
- Plectris ornaticeps Frey, 1967

Species of beetle

Plectris ornaticeps is a species of beetle of the family Scarabaeidae. It is found in Argentina.

== Description ==
Adults reach a length of about 13–14 mm. They are brown, but the antennae and legs light brown and anterior margin of the clypeus red. There is a broad red stripe in the middle, extending to the sutural stripe on the upper surface. The scutellum is reddish. The pronotum is very densely covered, while the elytra and pygidium are just densely covered with fine, whitish setae. The hairs on the pronotum are considerably longer than the hairs on the elytra, as are the hairs on the abdominal segments.
