= Plectris curtipilis =

Scientific classification
- Kingdom: Animalia
- Phylum: Arthropoda
- Class: Insecta
- Order: Coleoptera
- Suborder: Polyphaga
- Infraorder: Scarabaeiformia
- Family: Scarabaeidae
- Genus: Plectris
- Species: P. curtipilis

Binomial name
- Plectris curtipilis Frey, 1967

Species of beetle

Plectris curtipilis is a species of beetle of the family Scarabaeidae. It is found in Colombia.

== Description ==
Adults reach a length of about 13 mm. They are light reddish-brown. The upper surface is only very sparsely covered with very short, appressed setae, only on the sides of the elytra are the setae somewhat denser. The pronotum and elytra are light and short-ciliate. The underside is not very densely covered with appressed, rather long, fine hairs. On the pygidium, the hairs are considerably denser, longer, and erect.
