= Plectris brittoni =

Scientific classification
- Kingdom: Animalia
- Phylum: Arthropoda
- Class: Insecta
- Order: Coleoptera
- Suborder: Polyphaga
- Infraorder: Scarabaeiformia
- Family: Scarabaeidae
- Genus: Plectris
- Species: P. brittoni

Binomial name
- Plectris brittoni Frey, 1967

Species of beetle

Plectris brittoni is a species of beetle of the family Scarabaeidae. It is found in Brazil (São Paulo).

== Description ==
Adults reach a length of about 10 mm. They are light brown. The head, pronotum and scutellum are densely covered, while the elytra are less densely covered, with short, whitish, appressed setae. The underside is covered with long hairs. The pygidium is quite densely covered with somewhat erect white setae. The ribs are clearly visible on the elytra.
