= Hamatoplectris spinifer =

Scientific classification
- Kingdom: Animalia
- Phylum: Arthropoda
- Class: Insecta
- Order: Coleoptera
- Suborder: Polyphaga
- Infraorder: Scarabaeiformia
- Family: Scarabaeidae
- Genus: Hamatoplectris
- Species: H. spinifer

Binomial name
- Hamatoplectris spinifer Frey, 1967

Species of beetle

Hamatoplectris spinifer is a species of beetle of the family Scarabaeidae. It is found in Brazil (Minas Gerais).

== Description ==
Adults reach a length of about 11–12 mm. They are dark brown, with the elytra dull and the pronotum slightly glossy. The clypeus is sparsely but evenly covered with short, erect setae, while the rest of the head and the pronotum are densely covered with somewhat erect, rather long, very strong setae, which are more densely packed on the lateral margin of the pronotum than on the disc. The elytra have considerably shorter setae, but of the same density. Only on the ribs, there are some longer spiny setae.
