= Plectris luctuosa =

Scientific classification
- Kingdom: Animalia
- Phylum: Arthropoda
- Class: Insecta
- Order: Coleoptera
- Suborder: Polyphaga
- Infraorder: Scarabaeiformia
- Family: Scarabaeidae
- Genus: Plectris
- Species: P. luctuosa

Binomial name
- Plectris luctuosa Frey, 1967

Species of beetle

Plectris luctuosa is a species of beetle of the family Scarabaeidae. It is found in Brazil (Santa Catarina).

== Description ==
Adults reach a length of about 10 mm. They have a dull, dark brown, rather elongate body. The upper surface on the head and pronotum is densely covered with erect, on the elytra more appressed, pale setae. There are some bare patches on the elytra, as well as some irregularly arranged erect setae next to the appressed setae.
