= Plectris lobaticeps =

Scientific classification
- Kingdom: Animalia
- Phylum: Arthropoda
- Class: Insecta
- Order: Coleoptera
- Suborder: Polyphaga
- Infraorder: Scarabaeiformia
- Family: Scarabaeidae
- Genus: Plectris
- Species: P. lobaticeps

Binomial name
- Plectris lobaticeps Frey, 1967

Species of beetle

Plectris lobaticeps is a species of beetle of the family Scarabaeidae. It is found in Brazil (São Paulo).

== Description ==
Adults reach a length of about 13 mm. The upper and lower surfaces are dark brown, somewhat glossy, and densely covered with appressed, whitish-grey, rather long hairs. The elytra have regular bare patches on the ribs, with somewhat coarser setae along their upper margins. The pronotum also has bare patches and setae on the sides. The pygidium does have setae, but no bare patches.
