= Plectris collarti =

Scientific classification
- Kingdom: Animalia
- Phylum: Arthropoda
- Class: Insecta
- Order: Coleoptera
- Suborder: Polyphaga
- Infraorder: Scarabaeiformia
- Family: Scarabaeidae
- Genus: Plectris
- Species: P. collarti

Binomial name
- Plectris collarti Frey, 1967

Species of beetle

Plectris collarti is a species of beetle of the family Scarabaeidae. It is found in Uruguay.

== Description ==
Adults reach a length of about 12 mm. They are brown, moderately glossy, with the underside and antennae light brown. The upper surface is covered with long and dense brownish hairs, partly erect, partly appressed. The erect hairs are longer than the appressed ones. The thorax and pygidium are densely covered with erect hairs, and the ventral segments with dense and appressed long hairs.
