= Plectris breviceps =

Scientific classification
- Kingdom: Animalia
- Phylum: Arthropoda
- Class: Insecta
- Order: Coleoptera
- Suborder: Polyphaga
- Infraorder: Scarabaeiformia
- Family: Scarabaeidae
- Genus: Plectris
- Species: P. breviceps

Binomial name
- Plectris breviceps Frey, 1967

Species of beetle

Plectris breviceps is a species of beetle of the family Scarabaeidae. It is found in Brazil.

== Description ==
Adults reach a length of about 10 mm. They are brown and faintly glossy. The upper and lower surfaces are very densely covered with slightly erect, light grey, medium-length setae. Erect setae are present only on the pygidium. The clypeus is considerably more sparsely haired than the rest of the upper body.
