= Plectris pedestris =

Scientific classification
- Kingdom: Animalia
- Phylum: Arthropoda
- Class: Insecta
- Order: Coleoptera
- Suborder: Polyphaga
- Infraorder: Scarabaeiformia
- Family: Scarabaeidae
- Genus: Plectris
- Species: P. pedestris

Binomial name
- Plectris pedestris Frey, 1967

Species of beetle

Plectris pedestris is a species of beetle of the family Scarabaeidae. It is found in Brazil (Minas Gerais, São Paulo).

== Description ==
Adults reach a length of about 16–20 mm. They are light brown and dull. The clypeus is sparsely covered with erect hairs, the rest of the head, pronotum, elytra, pygidium and underside are very densely covered with appressed setae, which are somewhat longer on the pronotum.
