= Pseudoserica viridiaenea =

Scientific classification
- Kingdom: Animalia
- Phylum: Arthropoda
- Clade: Pancrustacea
- Class: Insecta
- Order: Coleoptera
- Suborder: Polyphaga
- Infraorder: Scarabaeiformia
- Family: Scarabaeidae
- Genus: Pseudoserica
- Species: P. viridiaenea

Binomial name
- Pseudoserica viridiaenea (Moser, 1918)

Synonyms
- Harpodactyla viridiaenea Moser, 1918

Species of beetle

Pseudoserica viridiaenea is a species of beetle of the family Scarabaeidae. It is found in Brazil (Rio de Janeiro).

== Description ==
Adults reach a length of about 7 mm. They have a bronze-green, elongate body. The frons is punctate (the punctures with pointed scales) and the antennae are yellowish-brown. The pronotum is rather widely and irregularly punctured, with narrow white scales before the base and beside the lateral margins. The elytra have a very fine, leathery sculpture, with narrow, white scales forming irregular marks.
