= Plectris tenebrosa =

Scientific classification
- Kingdom: Animalia
- Phylum: Arthropoda
- Class: Insecta
- Order: Coleoptera
- Suborder: Polyphaga
- Infraorder: Scarabaeiformia
- Family: Scarabaeidae
- Genus: Plectris
- Species: P. tenebrosa

Binomial name
- Plectris tenebrosa Frey, 1967

Species of beetle

Plectris tenebrosa is a species of beetle of the family Scarabaeidae. It is found in Peru.

== Description ==
Adults reach a length of about 12 mm. They are dark brown and dull. The upper surface is rather densely covered with more erect than appressed short, pale setae, on the elytra and on the lateral margin of the pronotum, there are some longer and coarser setae. These are very scattered and irregularly arranged. The scutellum is pubescent like the pronotum and the underside is covered with pale, appressed setae (somewhat longer on the thorax). The pygidium is pubescent like the pronotum, but with somewhat more numerous, erect setae.
