= Plectris festiva =

Scientific classification
- Kingdom: Animalia
- Phylum: Arthropoda
- Class: Insecta
- Order: Coleoptera
- Suborder: Polyphaga
- Infraorder: Scarabaeiformia
- Family: Scarabaeidae
- Genus: Plectris
- Species: P. festiva

Binomial name
- Plectris festiva (Burmeister, 1855)

Synonyms
- Philochloenia festiva Burmeister, 1855

Species of beetle

Plectris festiva is a species of scarab beetle in the family Scarabaeidae. It is found in Venezuela and Colombia.

== Description ==
Adults reach a length of about 10–12 mm.
