= Plectris candezei =

Scientific classification
- Kingdom: Animalia
- Phylum: Arthropoda
- Class: Insecta
- Order: Coleoptera
- Suborder: Polyphaga
- Infraorder: Scarabaeiformia
- Family: Scarabaeidae
- Genus: Plectris
- Species: P. candezei

Binomial name
- Plectris candezei Frey, 1967

Species of beetle

Plectris candezei is a species of beetle of the family Scarabaeidae. It is found in Brazil (Rio Grande do Sul), Guyana and Peru.

== Description ==
Adults reach a length of about 9 mm. They have a rather narrow and elongate, brown, shiny body. The upper surface is densely covered with rather long, mostly erect setae. Some setae on the elytra and pronotum stand out somewhat more than the others. The underside is densely covered with appressed, light-coloured, somewhat finer setae.
