= Plectris goetzi =

Scientific classification
- Kingdom: Animalia
- Phylum: Arthropoda
- Class: Insecta
- Order: Coleoptera
- Suborder: Polyphaga
- Infraorder: Scarabaeiformia
- Family: Scarabaeidae
- Genus: Plectris
- Species: P. goetzi

Binomial name
- Plectris goetzi Frey, 1967

Species of beetle

Plectris goetzi is a species of beetle of the family Scarabaeidae. It is found in Colombia.

== Description ==
Adults reach a length of about 14–15 mm. They are brown and glossy, but the underside is light brown and the antennae yellowish-brown. The clypeus is glabrous, while the rest of the head has a few erect setae. The pronotum and elytra are rather sparsely covered with short, appressed setae. The ribs on the elytra have glabrous patches, on which a few bristly hairs grow.
