= Plectris longeantennata =

Scientific classification
- Kingdom: Animalia
- Phylum: Arthropoda
- Class: Insecta
- Order: Coleoptera
- Suborder: Polyphaga
- Infraorder: Scarabaeiformia
- Family: Scarabaeidae
- Genus: Plectris
- Species: P. longeantennata

Binomial name
- Plectris longeantennata Frey, 1967

Species of beetle

Plectris longeantennata is a species of beetle of the family Scarabaeidae. It is found in Brazil.

== Description ==
Adults reach a length of about 7.5 mm. They are brown and moderately glossy. The upper and lower surfaces have medium-length, moderately dense, light grey hairs interspersed with some upright, but not coarse, hairs. The legs are also hairy.
