= Plectris sculpturata =

Scientific classification
- Kingdom: Animalia
- Phylum: Arthropoda
- Class: Insecta
- Order: Coleoptera
- Suborder: Polyphaga
- Infraorder: Scarabaeiformia
- Family: Scarabaeidae
- Genus: Plectris
- Species: P. sculpturata

Binomial name
- Plectris sculpturata Frey, 1967

Species of beetle

Plectris sculpturata is a species of beetle of the family Scarabaeidae. It is found in Venezuela.

== Description ==
Adults reach a length of about 10 mm. The upper and lower surfaces are somewhat glossy and brown, with a reddish sheen. The upper surface is moderately densely covered with appressed, shorter, light-coloured setae. The elytral ribs have regularly bare patches, on which stand a few, somewhat longer and denser, bristly hairs. The underside has appressed, light-coloured hairs, particularly on the thorax, and erect hairs on the pygidium.
