= Plectris conformis =

Scientific classification
- Kingdom: Animalia
- Phylum: Arthropoda
- Class: Insecta
- Order: Coleoptera
- Suborder: Polyphaga
- Infraorder: Scarabaeiformia
- Family: Scarabaeidae
- Genus: Plectris
- Species: P. conformis

Binomial name
- Plectris conformis Frey, 1967

Species of beetle

Plectris conformis is a species of beetle of the family Scarabaeidae. It is found in Colombia.

== Description ==
Adults reach a length of about 10–11 mm. They are dark brown and glossy. The clypeus has some erect, smaller setae, while the head, pronotum, elytra and scutellum are not very densely covered with erect, rather strong setae. Irregularly scattered, strong scale-like setae are also present on the elytra. The legs are coloured like the elytra and the underside and antennae are light brown.
