= Plectris vonvolxemi =

Scientific classification
- Kingdom: Animalia
- Phylum: Arthropoda
- Class: Insecta
- Order: Coleoptera
- Suborder: Polyphaga
- Infraorder: Scarabaeiformia
- Family: Scarabaeidae
- Genus: Plectris
- Species: P. vonvolxemi

Binomial name
- Plectris vonvolxemi Frey, 1967

Species of beetle

Plectris vonvolxemi is a species of beetle of the family Scarabaeidae. It is found in Brazil.

== Description ==
Adults reach a length of about 12 mm. They are reddish-brown, somewhat glossy and have an elongated shape. The clypeus has only a few short setae at the eye, while the back of the head has a row of appressed setae along the posterior margin. The pronotum and elytra are rather sparsely and irregularly covered with appressed pale setae.
