= Plectris sparsepunctata =

Scientific classification
- Kingdom: Animalia
- Phylum: Arthropoda
- Class: Insecta
- Order: Coleoptera
- Suborder: Polyphaga
- Infraorder: Scarabaeiformia
- Family: Scarabaeidae
- Genus: Plectris
- Species: P. sparsepunctata

Binomial name
- Plectris sparsepunctata Frey, 1967

Species of beetle

Plectris sparsepunctata is a species of beetle of the family Scarabaeidae. It is found in Colombia and Venezuela.

== Description ==
Adults reach a length of about 13 mm. They are dark brown (with the underside and antennae somewhat lighter) and slightly shiny. The head is glabrous and the pronotum has a few, very scattered, appressed setae. The lateral margins have pale cilia. The elytra have very scattered, appressed, pale setae, and the ribs have bare patches.
