= Plectris squamiger =

Scientific classification
- Kingdom: Animalia
- Phylum: Arthropoda
- Class: Insecta
- Order: Coleoptera
- Suborder: Polyphaga
- Infraorder: Scarabaeiformia
- Family: Scarabaeidae
- Genus: Plectris
- Species: P. squamiger

Binomial name
- Plectris squamiger Frey, 1967

Species of beetle

Plectris squamiger is a species of beetle of the family Scarabaeidae. It is found in Brazil.

== Description ==
Adults reach a length of about 10 mm. They are light brown and dull. The head (especially on the vertex and frons) is covered with somewhat erect, whitish scale-like setae. The pronotum is very densely covered with appressed whitish scales. The scutellum is similarly covered. The elytra are moderately densely covered with appressed scales, with some stronger white scale-like setae on the ribs. The pygidium is very densely covered with elongated white scales. At the apex is a row of erect, light-coloured hairs.
