= Plectris ruficollis =

Scientific classification
- Kingdom: Animalia
- Phylum: Arthropoda
- Clade: Pancrustacea
- Class: Insecta
- Order: Coleoptera
- Suborder: Polyphaga
- Infraorder: Scarabaeiformia
- Family: Scarabaeidae
- Genus: Plectris
- Species: P. ruficollis

Binomial name
- Plectris ruficollis Frey, 1976

Species of beetle

Plectris ruficollis is a species of beetle of the family Scarabaeidae. It is found in Brazil (Mato Grosso).

== Description ==
Adults reach a length of about 10–11 mm. The upper surface, pronotum and scutellum are light reddish-brown, while the elytra are dark reddish-brown and shiny. The pygidium, underside and legs are also light reddish-brown, the antennae are yellowish-brown and the pronotum and elytral margins have yellowish cilia.
