= Plectris costulata =

Scientific classification
- Kingdom: Animalia
- Phylum: Arthropoda
- Class: Insecta
- Order: Coleoptera
- Suborder: Polyphaga
- Infraorder: Scarabaeiformia
- Family: Scarabaeidae
- Genus: Plectris
- Species: P. costulata

Binomial name
- Plectris costulata Frey, 1967

Species of beetle

Plectris costulata is a species of beetle of the family Scarabaeidae. It is found in Brazil and Uruguay.

== Description ==
Adults reach a length of about 14 mm. The pronotum and scutellum are reddish-brown, the elytra dark brown and the legs and antennae light brown. The upper surface is glabrous, with at most a few short hairs at the margin in front of the elytra. The underside and pygidium are densely pubescent.
