= Plectris abdominalis =

Scientific classification
- Kingdom: Animalia
- Phylum: Arthropoda
- Class: Insecta
- Order: Coleoptera
- Suborder: Polyphaga
- Infraorder: Scarabaeiformia
- Family: Scarabaeidae
- Genus: Plectris
- Species: P. abdominalis

Binomial name
- Plectris abdominalis Frey, 1967

Species of beetle

Plectris abdominalis is a species of beetle of the family Scarabaeidae. It is found in Brazil (São Paulo).

== Description ==
Adults reach a length of about 12–13 mm. They are dark brown and slightly glossy. The clypeus is sparsely covered with erect hairs, while the frons and vertex, pronotum, scutellum and elytra are very densely covered with appressed setae, which are even denser on the pronotum. The appressed setae are interspersed with stout hairs, which are particularly dense on the lateral margins of the elytra and on the pygidium.
