= Plectris katovichi =

Scientific classification
- Kingdom: Animalia
- Phylum: Arthropoda
- Class: Insecta
- Order: Coleoptera
- Suborder: Polyphaga
- Infraorder: Scarabaeiformia
- Family: Scarabaeidae
- Genus: Plectris
- Species: P. katovichi

Binomial name
- Plectris katovichi Smith, 2008

Synonyms
- Plectris bonariensis Frey, 1967 (preocc.)

Species of beetle

Plectris katovichi is a species of beetle of the family Scarabaeidae. It is found in Argentina.

== Description ==
Adults reach a length of about 13–14 mm. They are somewhat glossy and brown, while the legs, antennae, underside and pygidium are reddish-brown. The entire upper surface (including the clypeus) is densely covered with long, appressed white hairs. Erect, bristly hairs are only found on the pygidium. The underside is also densely pubescent.
