= Pseudoserica aeneoviridis =

Scientific classification
- Kingdom: Animalia
- Phylum: Arthropoda
- Clade: Pancrustacea
- Class: Insecta
- Order: Coleoptera
- Suborder: Polyphaga
- Infraorder: Scarabaeiformia
- Family: Scarabaeidae
- Genus: Pseudoserica
- Species: P. aeneoviridis

Binomial name
- Pseudoserica aeneoviridis (Moser, 1918)

Synonyms
- Harpodactyla aeneoviridis Moser, 1918

Species of beetle

Pseudoserica aeneoviridis is a species of beetle of the family Scarabaeidae. It is found in Brazil (São Paulo).

== Description ==
Adults reach a length of about 8 mm. They are bronze-green and shiny and the upper surface is extensively covered with white setae. The head is strongly punctured, the punctures with setae. The antennae are yellowish-red. The pronotum is extensively punctured, smooth in the middle, the punctures with white setae. The elytra moderately densely and irregularly punctate, the punctures covered with whitish setae.
