= Plectris umbilicata =

Scientific classification
- Kingdom: Animalia
- Phylum: Arthropoda
- Class: Insecta
- Order: Coleoptera
- Suborder: Polyphaga
- Infraorder: Scarabaeiformia
- Family: Scarabaeidae
- Genus: Plectris
- Species: P. umbilicata

Binomial name
- Plectris umbilicata Frey, 1967

Species of beetle

Plectris umbilicata is a species of beetle of the family Scarabaeidae. It is found in Brazil.

== Description ==
Adults reach a length of about 10 mm. They have a brown, moderately glossy, rather elongated body. The upper surface is fairly sparsely covered with medium-length, appressed setae. On the pronotum, the setae are somewhat denser. The underside is covered with appressed, equally strong setae, while the thorax is covered with long, somewhat finer setae. On the pygidium, the setae are somewhat longer and finer, and mostly erect.
