= Plectris reitteri =

Scientific classification
- Kingdom: Animalia
- Phylum: Arthropoda
- Class: Insecta
- Order: Coleoptera
- Suborder: Polyphaga
- Infraorder: Scarabaeiformia
- Family: Scarabaeidae
- Genus: Plectris
- Species: P. reitteri

Binomial name
- Plectris reitteri Frey, 1967

Species of beetle

Plectris reitteri is a species of beetle of the family Scarabaeidae. It is found in Brazil (Mato Grosso, Rio Grande do Sul, Santa Catarina).

== Description ==
Adults reach a length of about 13–17 mm. The upper and lower surfaces are dark brown and somewhat glossy. Except for the bare clypeus, the upper and lower surfaces are densely covered with long, yellowish, somewhat erect hairs. On the ribs of the elytra, there are regular bare patches with very long and somewhat thicker setae.
