= Plectris intermixta =

Scientific classification
- Kingdom: Animalia
- Phylum: Arthropoda
- Class: Insecta
- Order: Coleoptera
- Suborder: Polyphaga
- Infraorder: Scarabaeiformia
- Family: Scarabaeidae
- Genus: Plectris
- Species: P. intermixta

Binomial name
- Plectris intermixta Frey, 1967

Species of beetle

Plectris intermixta is a species of beetle of the family Scarabaeidae. It is found in Argentina.

== Description ==
Adults reach a length of about 14–15 mm. They are brown and slightly glossy. The upper surface is densely covered with moderately long (partly longer and shorter) setae. The underside has long and dense hairs, and the thorax has very long and shaggy hairs. The clypeus only has short, erect setae on its upper surface, while the pygidium is densely covered with long hairs.
