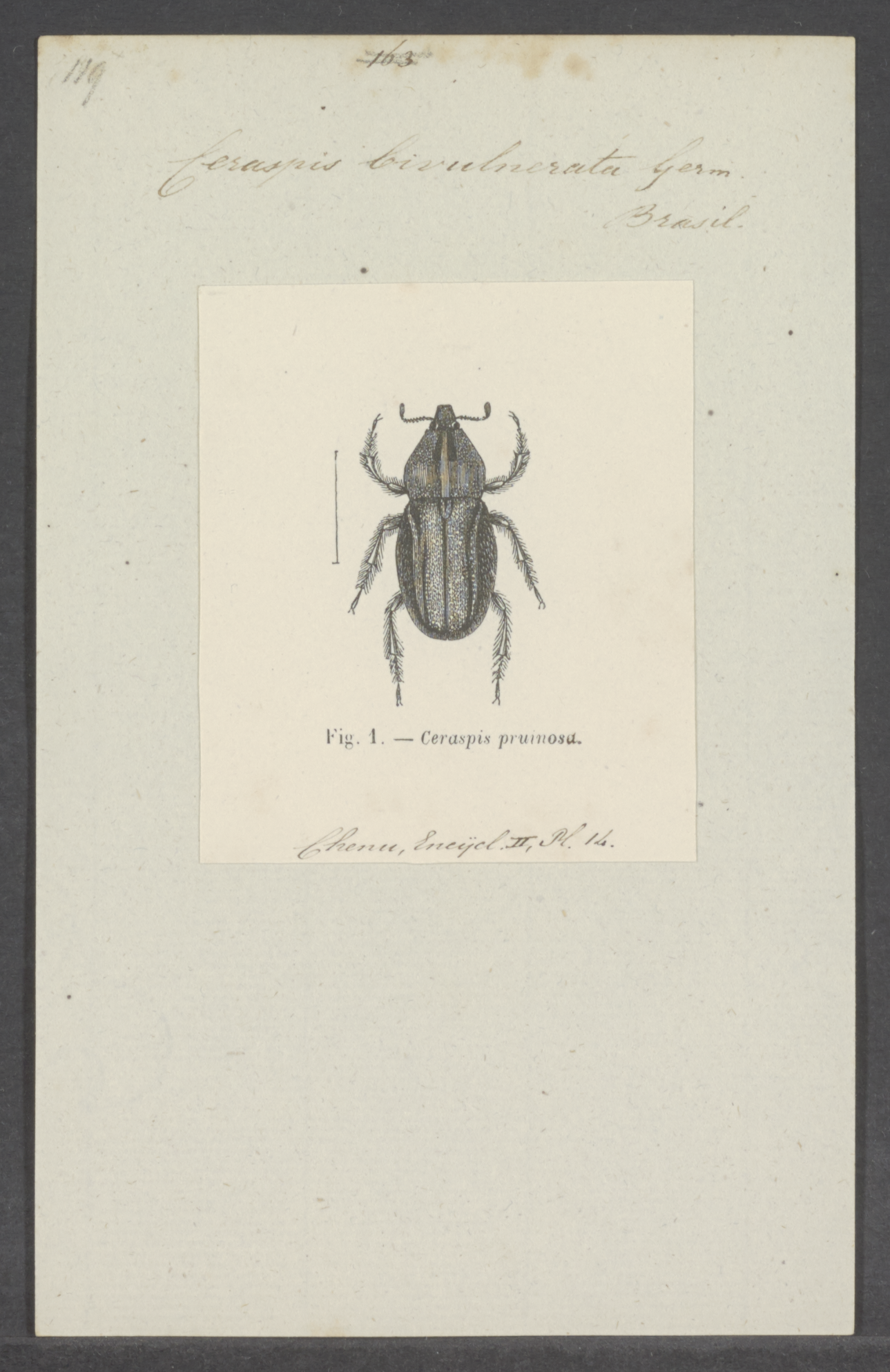

Scientific classification
- Domain: Eukaryota
- Kingdom: Animalia
- Phylum: Arthropoda
- Class: Insecta
- Order: Coleoptera
- Suborder: Polyphaga
- Infraorder: Scarabaeiformia
- Family: Scarabaeidae
- Tribe: Macrodactylini
- Genus: Ceraspis; Le Peletier & Serville, 1825

Species
- See text

= Ceraspis =

Genus of beetles

Ceraspis is a genus of beetles in the subfamily Melolonthinae. It is Neotropical, ranging from Mexico to Argentina.

== Species ==
- Ceraspis ajonjoli Mora-Aguilar, Delgado & Vallejo, 2013
- Ceraspis albipennis Frey, 1973
- Ceraspis albovaria Blanchard, 1850
- Ceraspis alvarengai Frey, 1973
- Ceraspis amazonica Frey, 1962
- Ceraspis amoena Frey, 1962
- Ceraspis bicolor Moser, 1919
- Ceraspis bivittata Burmeister, 1855
- Ceraspis bivulnerata (Germar, 1824)
- Ceraspis brittoni Frey, 1962
- Ceraspis brunneipennis (Bates, 1887)
- Ceraspis bufo Frey, 1962
- Ceraspis burmeisteri Frey, 1962
- Ceraspis castaneipennis Blanchard, 1850
- Ceraspis centralis (Sharp, 1877)
- Ceraspis cinerea Moser, 1921
- Ceraspis citrina Blanchard, 1850
- Ceraspis clypealis Frey, 1962
- Ceraspis colon Burmeister, 1855
- Ceraspis conspersa Burmeister, 1855
- Ceraspis convexicollis Frey, 1969
- Ceraspis cornuta (Blanchard, 1850)
- Ceraspis costulata Frey, 1965
- Ceraspis decora Gory, 1829
- Ceraspis diversa Frey, 1962
- Ceraspis dorsata Burmeister, 1855
- Ceraspis dorsopicta Frey, 1972
- Ceraspis elegans Nonfried, 1891
- Ceraspis elongata Frey, 1962
- Ceraspis farinosa Burmeister, 1855
- Ceraspis femorata Frey, 1969
- Ceraspis flava Blanchard, 1850
- Ceraspis fulva Blanchard, 1850
- Ceraspis gibbicollis Blanchard, 1850
- Ceraspis globicollis Frey, 1962
- Ceraspis griseosquamosa Moser, 1921
- Ceraspis guttata Blanchard, 1850
- Ceraspis hispida (Bates, 1887)
- Ceraspis imitatrix Nonfried, 1891
- Ceraspis immaculata Burmeister, 1855
- Ceraspis innotata (Blanchard, 1850)
- Ceraspis insularis (Arrow, 1903)
- Ceraspis jaliscoensis Delgado & Navarrete-Heredia, 2004
- Ceraspis klenei Brenske, 1890
- Ceraspis kuntzeni Moser, 1921
- Ceraspis lepida Frey, 1973
- Ceraspis leucosoma Blanchard, 1850
- Ceraspis lineata (Waterhouse, 1879)
- Ceraspis linharensis Frey, 1973
- Ceraspis lurida Frey, 1962
- Ceraspis macrophylla Moser, 1919
- Ceraspis martinezi Frey, 1962
- Ceraspis melanoleuca Serville, 1825
- Ceraspis mexicana (Harold, 1863)
- Ceraspis mixta Blanchard, 1850
- Ceraspis modesta Burmeister, 1855
- Ceraspis moseri Frey, 1962
- Ceraspis mustela Frey, 1962
- Ceraspis mutica Moser, 1921
- Ceraspis nitida Frey, 1962
- Ceraspis nivea Serville, 1825
- Ceraspis niveipennis Gistel, 1857
- Ceraspis oaxacaensis Delgado, 2001
- Ceraspis oblonga Moser, 1919
- Ceraspis obscura Blanchard, 1850
- Ceraspis ocellata Frey, 1962
- Ceraspis ohausi Moser, 1921
- Ceraspis opacipennis (Moser, 1919)
- Ceraspis ornata Frey, 1962
- Ceraspis pallida Blanchard, 1850
- Ceraspis pauperata Burmeister, 1855
- Ceraspis penai Frey, 1964
- Ceraspis pereirae Frey, 1962
- Ceraspis pilatei (Harold, 1863)
- Ceraspis plaumanni Frey, 1962
- Ceraspis pulchra Frey, 1962
- Ceraspis quadrifoliata Moser, 1919
- Ceraspis quadrimaculata (Blanchard, 1850)
- Ceraspis quadripustulata (Blanchard, 1850)
- Ceraspis rotundicollis Frey, 1973
- Ceraspis rubiginosa (Latreille, 1812)
- Ceraspis ruehli Brenske, 1890
- Ceraspis ruficollis Frey, 1962
- Ceraspis rufoscutellata Moser, 1919
- Ceraspis setiventris Moser, 1921
- Ceraspis signata Blanchard, 1850
- Ceraspis sparsesetosa Frey, 1972
- Ceraspis squamulata Moser, 1924
- Ceraspis squamulifera (Moser, 1919)
- Ceraspis striata Frey, 1973
- Ceraspis subvittata Moser, 1921
- Ceraspis sulcicollis Moser, 1921
- Ceraspis tenuisquamosa Frey, 1962
- Ceraspis tibialis Blanchard, 1850
- Ceraspis unguicularis Moser, 1919
- Ceraspis variegata (Perty, 1833)
- Ceraspis ventralis Frey, 1962
- Ceraspis vestita Blanchard, 1850
- Ceraspis vittata Moser, 1919
- Ceraspis vulpes Frey, 1962
- Ceraspis zikani Moser, 1924

== See also ==
- Ceraspis Schultze 1887 is also an extinct (and preoccupied) name for a genus of placoderm.
