= Plectris glabrata =

Scientific classification
- Kingdom: Animalia
- Phylum: Arthropoda
- Class: Insecta
- Order: Coleoptera
- Suborder: Polyphaga
- Infraorder: Scarabaeiformia
- Family: Scarabaeidae
- Genus: Plectris
- Species: P. glabrata

Binomial name
- Plectris glabrata Frey, 1967

Species of beetle

Plectris glabrata is a species of beetle of the family Scarabaeidae. It is found in Brazil.

== Description ==
Adults reach a length of about 12 mm. They are blackish-brown, glossy, while the underside, legs, antennae, and pygidium are brown. The dorsal surface is smooth. The elytral apices are somewhat fringed.
