= Plectris glabripennis =

Scientific classification
- Kingdom: Animalia
- Phylum: Arthropoda
- Class: Insecta
- Order: Coleoptera
- Suborder: Polyphaga
- Infraorder: Scarabaeiformia
- Family: Scarabaeidae
- Genus: Plectris
- Species: P. glabripennis

Binomial name
- Plectris glabripennis Frey, 1967

Species of beetle

Plectris glabripennis is a species of beetle of the family Scarabaeidae. It is found in Brazil (Santa Catarina).

== Description ==
Adults reach a length of about 15 mm. They are blackish-brown, moderately glossy, with the head, pronotum and elytra essentially smooth, with only a few bristly hairs at the front corners of the pronotum, as well as at the base and apical protuberances of the elytra.
