= Plectris argentata =

Scientific classification
- Kingdom: Animalia
- Phylum: Arthropoda
- Class: Insecta
- Order: Coleoptera
- Suborder: Polyphaga
- Infraorder: Scarabaeiformia
- Family: Scarabaeidae
- Genus: Plectris
- Species: P. argentata

Binomial name
- Plectris argentata Frey, 1967

Species of beetle

Plectris argentata is a species of beetle of the family Scarabaeidae. It is found in Brazil (Rio de Janeiro).

== Description ==
Adults reach a length of about 21 mm. They have a light brown, elongated, egg-shaped body. The upper surface is very densely covered with appressed, broad, silvery-grey scales, interspersed with individual white scales. The pygidium and underside are covered with appressed scale-like setae.
