= Plectris gutierrezi =

Scientific classification
- Kingdom: Animalia
- Phylum: Arthropoda
- Class: Insecta
- Order: Coleoptera
- Suborder: Polyphaga
- Infraorder: Scarabaeiformia
- Family: Scarabaeidae
- Genus: Plectris
- Species: P. gutierrezi

Binomial name
- Plectris gutierrezi Frey, 1967

Species of beetle

Plectris gutierrezi is a species of beetle of the family Scarabaeidae. It is found in Brazil (Minas Gerais).

== Description ==
Adults reach a length of about 9 mm. They are light brown, with the pronotum and head a little darker. The upper surface is densely covered with not very long, slightly erect setae, distinguished on the ribs by a small, somewhat stronger, bristle-like structure. The underside is densely covered with appressed hairs, while the thorax and pygidium are covered with dense white hairs. The hairs on the pygidium are erect. The ribs on the elytra are distinct.
