= Plectris plaumanniella =

Scientific classification
- Kingdom: Animalia
- Phylum: Arthropoda
- Class: Insecta
- Order: Coleoptera
- Suborder: Polyphaga
- Infraorder: Scarabaeiformia
- Family: Scarabaeidae
- Genus: Plectris
- Species: P. plaumanniella

Binomial name
- Plectris plaumanniella Frey, 1967

Species of beetle

Plectris plaumanniella is a species of beetle of the family Scarabaeidae. It is found in Brazil (Piauí).

== Description ==
Adults reach a length of about 9.5 mm. They are brown and dull. The clypeus is moderately densely covered with short, erect setae, while the rest of the head, pronotum, elytra and scutellum are densely covered with short but consistently appressed, rather fine setae. The ribs have some bare patches and erect scale-like setae.
