= Plectris vauriella =

Scientific classification
- Kingdom: Animalia
- Phylum: Arthropoda
- Class: Insecta
- Order: Coleoptera
- Suborder: Polyphaga
- Infraorder: Scarabaeiformia
- Family: Scarabaeidae
- Genus: Plectris
- Species: P. vauriella

Binomial name
- Plectris vauriella Frey, 1967

Species of beetle

Plectris vauriella is a species of beetle of the family Scarabaeidae. It is found in Bolivia.

== Description ==
Adults reach a length of about 12 mm. They are brown and barely glossy. The head is glabrous except for the posterior margin of the vertex, where it is covered with a few erect setae. The pronotum and elytra are sparsely covered with somewhat erect, medium-length setae. Bare patches are found on the ribs. On the pronotum, the setae are somewhat more erect than on the elytra.
