= Plectris densaticollis =

Scientific classification
- Kingdom: Animalia
- Phylum: Arthropoda
- Class: Insecta
- Order: Coleoptera
- Suborder: Polyphaga
- Infraorder: Scarabaeiformia
- Family: Scarabaeidae
- Genus: Plectris
- Species: P. densaticollis

Binomial name
- Plectris densaticollis Frey, 1967

Species of beetle

Plectris densaticollis is a species of beetle of the family Scarabaeidae. It is found in Brazil (São Paulo).

== Description ==
Adults reach a length of about 10 mm. They are dark brown and slightly glossy, with light brown antennae. The head has a few medium-length appressed setae and the pronotum is very sparsely covered with a few setae, which are only somewhat denser on the lateral margins. The elytra are covered with appressed, rather short setae, with somewhat coarser and longer setae on the ribs. The ribs have bare patches. The underside is covered with long and dense light-coloured hairs.
