= Pseudoserica fulvipennis =

Scientific classification
- Kingdom: Animalia
- Phylum: Arthropoda
- Clade: Pancrustacea
- Class: Insecta
- Order: Coleoptera
- Suborder: Polyphaga
- Infraorder: Scarabaeiformia
- Family: Scarabaeidae
- Genus: Pseudoserica
- Species: P. fulvipennis

Binomial name
- Pseudoserica fulvipennis (Moser, 1918)

Synonyms
- Harpodactyla fulvipennis Moser, 1918

Species of beetle

Pseudoserica fulvipennis is a species of beetle of the family Scarabaeidae. It is found in Brazil (Rio de Janeiro).

== Description ==
Adults reach a length of about 7–9 mm. They have an elongate body, with the head and pronotum brown, and with a more or less metallic green sheen. The elytra are yellow and the underside is reddish-yellow. The head is densely punctured, the punctures with yellowish setae. The antennae are reddish-yellow. The pronotum is sparsely punctured, the punctures with white, bristle-like hairs. The elytra have rather coarse punctures, arranged in irregular rows. The punctures are covered with bristle-like hairs.
