= Plectris squamisetis =

Scientific classification
- Kingdom: Animalia
- Phylum: Arthropoda
- Class: Insecta
- Order: Coleoptera
- Suborder: Polyphaga
- Infraorder: Scarabaeiformia
- Family: Scarabaeidae
- Genus: Plectris
- Species: P. squamisetis

Binomial name
- Plectris squamisetis Frey, 1967

Species of beetle

Plectris squamisetis is a species of beetle of the family Scarabaeidae. It is found in Brazil (Paraná).

== Description ==
Adults reach a length of about 7.5 mm. They are reddish-brown and mostly dull (only the clypeus is slightly glossy). The clypeus is covered with short, erect hairs. The rest of the head, pronotum, elytra and underside are very densely covered with appressed, whitish, scale-like setae. The pygidium is covered with short, erect setae, as are the legs.
