= Plectris penaella =

Scientific classification
- Kingdom: Animalia
- Phylum: Arthropoda
- Class: Insecta
- Order: Coleoptera
- Suborder: Polyphaga
- Infraorder: Scarabaeiformia
- Family: Scarabaeidae
- Genus: Plectris
- Species: P. penaella

Binomial name
- Plectris penaella Frey, 1967

Species of beetle

Plectris penaella is a species of beetle of the family Scarabaeidae. It is found in Peru.

== Description ==
Adults reach a length of about 11 mm. They are dark brown and mostly dull, although the pronotum is slightly shiny. The body is elongate and cylindrical. The clypeus is covered with a few erect setae, while the head, pronotum and elytra are densely covered with mostly erect setae. On the elytra, the setae are almost uniformly mixed with somewhat longer and stronger erect setae. The underside is densely covered with appressed whitish setae.
