= Plectris herteli =

Scientific classification
- Kingdom: Animalia
- Phylum: Arthropoda
- Class: Insecta
- Order: Coleoptera
- Suborder: Polyphaga
- Infraorder: Scarabaeiformia
- Family: Scarabaeidae
- Genus: Plectris
- Species: P. herteli

Binomial name
- Plectris herteli Frey, 1967

Species of beetle

Plectris herteli is a species of beetle of the family Scarabaeidae. It is found in Colombia.

== Description ==
Adults reach a length of about 15 mm. The upper and lower surfaces are brown and glossy, the upper surface somewhat light-spotted. The pygidium has light spots. The underside is somewhat lighter, and the legs and antennae are light brown. The upper surface is smooth except for a few barely visible, very scattered, short setae. The pronotum and elytral margins have light cilia. The underside has long yellow hairs and the thorax is densely covered with them.
