= Plectris penai =

Scientific classification
- Kingdom: Animalia
- Phylum: Arthropoda
- Class: Insecta
- Order: Coleoptera
- Suborder: Polyphaga
- Infraorder: Scarabaeiformia
- Family: Scarabaeidae
- Genus: Plectris
- Species: P. penai

Binomial name
- Plectris penai Frey, 1967

Species of beetle

Plectris penai is a species of beetle of the family Scarabaeidae. It is found in Peru.

== Description ==
Adults reach a length of about 10 mm. They are brown, with yellowish-brown antennae. The upper surface is quite densely covered with longer, appressed setae. On the ribs with distinct striate hairs, which, however, are not much stronger than the other setae. The scutellum is somewhat more densely pubescent. On the underside, the thorax is covered with long and dense light-coloured hairs.
