= Plectris tetraphylla =

Scientific classification
- Kingdom: Animalia
- Phylum: Arthropoda
- Class: Insecta
- Order: Coleoptera
- Suborder: Polyphaga
- Infraorder: Scarabaeiformia
- Family: Scarabaeidae
- Genus: Plectris
- Species: P. tetraphylla

Binomial name
- Plectris tetraphylla Frey, 1967

Species of beetle

Plectris tetraphylla is a species of beetle of the family Scarabaeidae. It is found in Brazil.

== Description ==
Adults reach a length of about 7–8 mm. They have a light reddish-brown, parallel and rather elongated body, with the head somewhat darker. The pronotum and scutellum are fairly densely and evenly covered with somewhat longer (otherwise rather short), somewhat erect light setae. Some longer, erect setae are found on the elytra. The underside and the pygidium are light and rather thinly covered with moderately long setae.
