= Plectris cylindriformis =

Scientific classification
- Kingdom: Animalia
- Phylum: Arthropoda
- Class: Insecta
- Order: Coleoptera
- Suborder: Polyphaga
- Infraorder: Scarabaeiformia
- Family: Scarabaeidae
- Genus: Plectris
- Species: P. cylindriformis

Binomial name
- Plectris cylindriformis Frey, 1967

Species of beetle

Plectris cylindriformis is a species of beetle of the family Scarabaeidae. It is found in Venezuela.

== Description ==
Adults reach a length of about 10 mm. They are dark brown, with the clypeus glabrous and the upper surface sparsely but fairly regularly covered with somewhat unequal, light-coloured setae. On the pronotum, the setae are a little longer and more erect. The pygidium is moderately densely covered with erect setae and the scutellum is pubescent like the elytra.
