= Rhinaspis aeneofusca =

Scientific classification
- Kingdom: Animalia
- Phylum: Arthropoda
- Clade: Pancrustacea
- Class: Insecta
- Order: Coleoptera
- Suborder: Polyphaga
- Infraorder: Scarabaeiformia
- Family: Scarabaeidae
- Genus: Rhinaspis
- Species: R. aeneofusca

Binomial name
- Rhinaspis aeneofusca (Moser, 1919)

Synonyms
- Rhinaspoides aeneofusca Moser, 1919

Species of beetle

Rhinaspis aeneofusca is a species of beetle of the family Scarabaeidae. It is found in Brazil (Espírito Santo, São Paulo).

== Description ==
Adults reach a length of about 12–13 mm. They are reddish-brown or blackish-brown with an ornate sheen. The antennae are yellowish-brown. The pronotum is moderately densely covered with rather large punctures, some of which are bristled. The scutellum is punctate except in the middle. The elytra have a weakly wrinkled punctation, and each elytron has four raised, almost smooth ridges. A number of punctures are covered with pale setae, particularly along the edges of the ribs. The sides of the elytra are fringed with cilia. The pygidium is very densely covered with bristle-bearing punctures. On the underside, the punctation is sparse on the middle of the thorax, and dense on the sides of the thorax and on the abdomen. The punctures have appressed pale setae.
