= Pseudoserica metallescens =

Scientific classification
- Kingdom: Animalia
- Phylum: Arthropoda
- Clade: Pancrustacea
- Class: Insecta
- Order: Coleoptera
- Suborder: Polyphaga
- Infraorder: Scarabaeiformia
- Family: Scarabaeidae
- Genus: Pseudoserica
- Species: P. metallescens

Binomial name
- Pseudoserica metallescens (Moser, 1918)

Synonyms
- Harpodactyla metallescens Moser, 1918; Plectris metallescens

Species of beetle

Pseudoserica metallescens is a species of beetle of the family Scarabaeidae. It is found in Brazil (Espírito Santo).

== Description ==
Adults reach a length of about 8–9 mm. They have a dark brown, elongate body, with a metallic sheen on the upper surface. They are yellowish-brown or reddish-brown on the underside. Due to the fine, leathery sculpture, the elytra are only weakly shiny. The head is densely punctate, the frons with short, greyish setae. The antennae are brown. The pronotum is quite densely punctured, with the punctures covered with short, grey setae. The elytra are punctured, with each elytron showing four faint ribs. The punctures have, grey, hair-like setae, while erect setae on the ribs are arranged in rows.
