= Plectris =

Scientific classification
- Kingdom: Animalia
- Phylum: Arthropoda
- Class: Insecta
- Order: Coleoptera
- Suborder: Polyphaga
- Infraorder: Scarabaeiformia
- Family: Scarabaeidae
- Tribe: Macrodactylini
- Genus: Plectris; LePeletier & Serville, 1828

Diversity
- at least 360 species

Synonyms
- Euryaspis Blanchard, 1851; Junkia Dalla Torre, 1913; Pseudoserica Guérin-Méneville, 1838; Trichoderma Nonfried, 1894

Genus of beetles

Plectris is a genus of May beetles and junebugs in the family Scarabaeidae. There are more than 360 described species in Plectris.

== See also ==
- List of Plectris species
