= Cacia subfasciata =

Scientific classification
- Kingdom: Animalia
- Phylum: Arthropoda
- Clade: Pancrustacea
- Class: Insecta
- Order: Coleoptera
- Suborder: Polyphaga
- Infraorder: Cucujiformia
- Family: Cerambycidae
- Genus: Cacia
- Species: C. subfasciata

Binomial name
- Cacia subfasciata Schwarzer, 1930

Synonyms
- Cacia sondaica Breuning, 1935

Species of beetle

Cacia subfasciata is a species of beetle in the family Cerambycidae. It was described by Schwarzer in 1930. It is known from Sumatra and Java.
