= Cacia butuana =

Scientific classification
- Kingdom: Animalia
- Phylum: Arthropoda
- Class: Insecta
- Order: Coleoptera
- Suborder: Polyphaga
- Infraorder: Cucujiformia
- Family: Cerambycidae
- Genus: Cacia
- Species: C. butuana

Binomial name
- Cacia butuana Heller, 1923

Species of beetle

Cacia butuana is a species of beetle in the family Cerambycidae. It was described by Heller in 1923.

== Subspecies ==
- Cacia butuana butuana Heller, 1923
- Cacia butuana negria Heller, 1924
