= Cacia grisescens =

Scientific classification
- Kingdom: Animalia
- Phylum: Arthropoda
- Class: Insecta
- Order: Coleoptera
- Suborder: Polyphaga
- Infraorder: Cucujiformia
- Family: Cerambycidae
- Genus: Cacia
- Species: C. grisescens

Binomial name
- Cacia grisescens Breuning, 1935

Species of beetle

Cacia grisescens is a species of beetle in the family Cerambycidae. It was described by Stephan von Breuning in 1935. It is known from Malaysia.
