= Cacia batoensis =

Scientific classification
- Kingdom: Animalia
- Phylum: Arthropoda
- Class: Insecta
- Order: Coleoptera
- Suborder: Polyphaga
- Infraorder: Cucujiformia
- Family: Cerambycidae
- Genus: Cacia
- Species: C. batoensis

Binomial name
- Cacia batoensis Breuning, 1956

Species of beetle

Cacia batoensis is a species of beetle in the family Cerambycidae. It was described by Stephan von Breuning in 1956. It is known from Malaysia.
