= Cacia integricornis =

Scientific classification
- Kingdom: Animalia
- Phylum: Arthropoda
- Class: Insecta
- Order: Coleoptera
- Suborder: Polyphaga
- Infraorder: Cucujiformia
- Family: Cerambycidae
- Genus: Cacia
- Species: C. integricornis

Binomial name
- Cacia integricornis Schwarzer, 1930

Species of beetle

Cacia integricornis is a species of beetle in the family Cerambycidae. It was described by Schwarzer in 1930. It is known from Sumatra.
