= Cacia setulosa =

Scientific classification
- Kingdom: Animalia
- Phylum: Arthropoda
- Clade: Pancrustacea
- Class: Insecta
- Order: Coleoptera
- Suborder: Polyphaga
- Infraorder: Cucujiformia
- Family: Cerambycidae
- Genus: Cacia
- Species: C. setulosa

Binomial name
- Cacia setulosa Pascoe, 1857

Species of beetle

Cacia setulosa is a species of beetle in the family Cerambycidae. It was described by Francis Polkinghorne Pascoe in 1857. It is known from Java.
