= Cacia milagrosae =

Scientific classification
- Kingdom: Animalia
- Phylum: Arthropoda
- Class: Insecta
- Order: Coleoptera
- Suborder: Polyphaga
- Infraorder: Cucujiformia
- Family: Cerambycidae
- Genus: Cacia
- Species: C. milagrosae

Binomial name
- Cacia milagrosae Hüdepohl, 1989

Species of beetle

Cacia milagrosae is a species of beetle in the family Cerambycidae. It was described by Karl-Ernst Hüdepohl in 1989. It is known from the Philippines.
