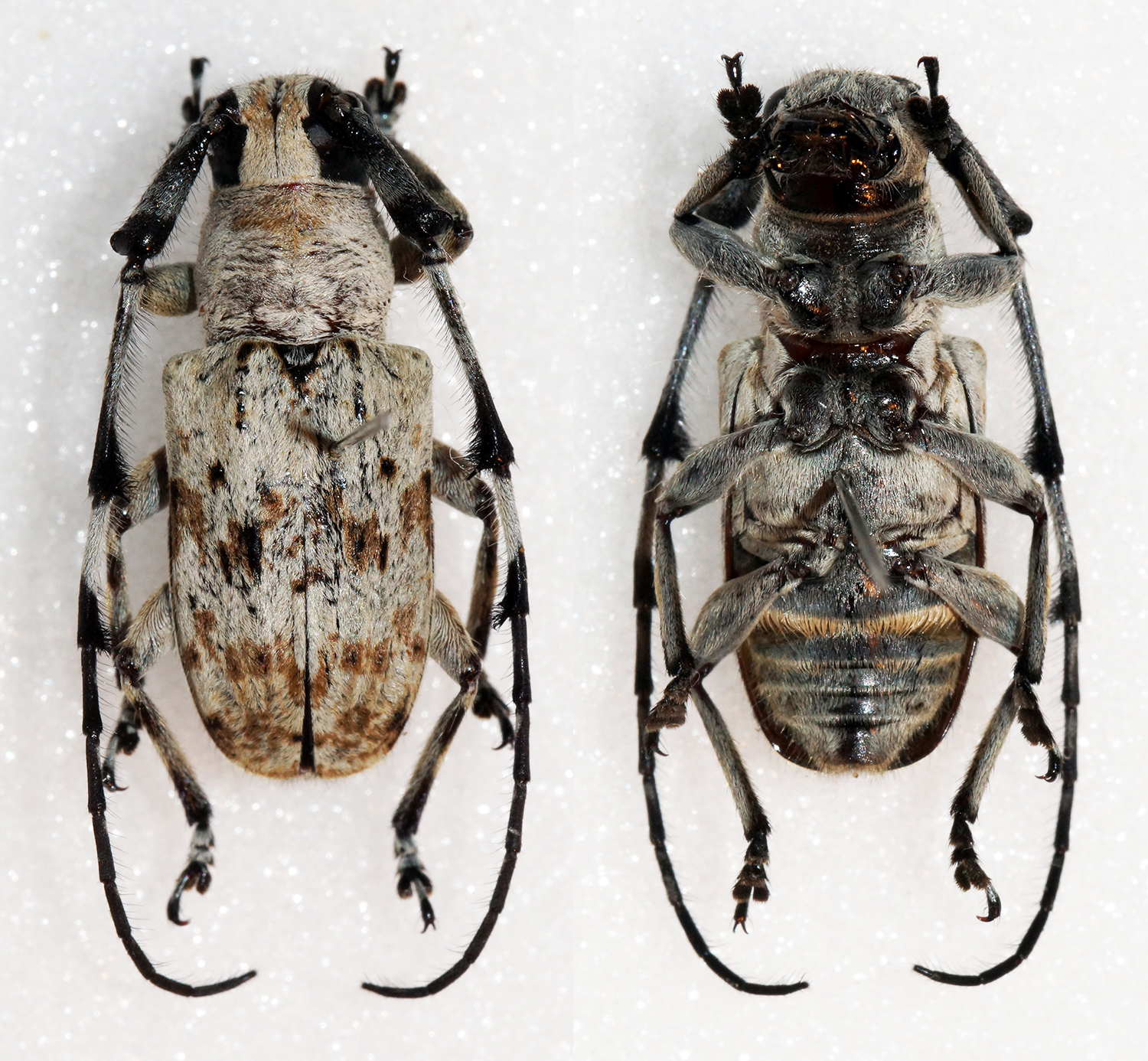

Scientific classification
- Kingdom: Animalia
- Phylum: Arthropoda
- Class: Insecta
- Order: Coleoptera
- Suborder: Polyphaga
- Infraorder: Cucujiformia
- Family: Cerambycidae
- Genus: Cacia
- Species: C. melanopsis

Binomial name
- Cacia melanopsis Pascoe, 1866

Synonyms
- Cacia pistor Pascoe, 1866

= Cacia melanopsis =

Species of beetle

Cacia melanopsis is a species of beetle in the family Cerambycidae. It was described by Francis Polkinghorne Pascoe in 1866. It is known from Borneo and Malaysia.
