= Cacia guttata =

Scientific classification
- Kingdom: Animalia
- Phylum: Arthropoda
- Clade: Pancrustacea
- Class: Insecta
- Order: Coleoptera
- Suborder: Polyphaga
- Infraorder: Cucujiformia
- Family: Cerambycidae
- Genus: Cacia
- Species: C. guttata

Binomial name
- Cacia guttata (Aurivillius, 1927)

Species of beetle

Cacia guttata is a species of beetle in the family Cerambycidae. It was described by Per Olof Christopher Aurivillius in 1927. It is known from Java and Moluccas.

== Subspecies ==
- Cacia guttata aberrans Breuning, 1939
- Cacia guttata guttata (Aurivillius, 1927)
