= Cacia fasciolata =

Scientific classification
- Kingdom: Animalia
- Phylum: Arthropoda
- Class: Insecta
- Order: Coleoptera
- Suborder: Polyphaga
- Infraorder: Cucujiformia
- Family: Cerambycidae
- Genus: Cacia
- Species: C. fasciolata

Binomial name
- Cacia fasciolata (Boisduval, 1835)

Synonyms
- Lamia fasciolata Boisduval, 1835

Species of beetle

Cacia fasciolata is a species of beetle in the family Cerambycidae. It was described by Jean Baptiste Boisduval in 1835, originally under the genus Lamia.
