= Cacia kaszabi =

Scientific classification
- Kingdom: Animalia
- Phylum: Arthropoda
- Clade: Pancrustacea
- Class: Insecta
- Order: Coleoptera
- Suborder: Polyphaga
- Infraorder: Cucujiformia
- Family: Cerambycidae
- Genus: Cacia
- Species: C. kaszabi

Binomial name
- Cacia kaszabi Breuning, 1954

Species of beetle

Cacia kaszabi is a species of beetle in the family Cerambycidae. It was described by Stephan von Breuning in 1954. It is known from Sulawesi.
