= Cacia beccarii =

Scientific classification
- Kingdom: Animalia
- Phylum: Arthropoda
- Clade: Pancrustacea
- Class: Insecta
- Order: Coleoptera
- Suborder: Polyphaga
- Infraorder: Cucujiformia
- Family: Cerambycidae
- Genus: Cacia
- Species: C. beccarii

Binomial name
- Cacia beccarii Gahan, 1907

Species of beetle

Cacia beccarii is a species of beetle in the family Cerambycidae. The species was described and named by Irish entomologist Charles Joseph Gahan in 1907. It is native and endemic to the island of Sumatra, Indonesia.
