= Cacia aspersa =

Scientific classification
- Kingdom: Animalia
- Phylum: Arthropoda
- Class: Insecta
- Order: Coleoptera
- Suborder: Polyphaga
- Infraorder: Cucujiformia
- Family: Cerambycidae
- Genus: Cacia
- Species: C. aspersa

Binomial name
- Cacia aspersa Newman, 1842

Synonyms
- Cacia aspersa m. albostictica Breuning, 1974; Cacia enganensis Breuning, 1938

Species of beetle

Cacia aspersa is a species of beetle in the family Cerambycidae. It was described by Newman in 1842. It is known from the Philippines.
