= Cacia formosana =

Scientific classification
- Kingdom: Animalia
- Phylum: Arthropoda
- Class: Insecta
- Order: Coleoptera
- Suborder: Polyphaga
- Infraorder: Cucujiformia
- Family: Cerambycidae
- Genus: Cacia
- Species: C. formosana

Binomial name
- Cacia formosana (Schwarzer, 1925)

Synonyms
- Mesosa formosana Schwarzer, 1925

Species of beetle

Cacia formosana is a species of beetle in the family Cerambycidae. It was described by Schwarzer in 1925, originally under the genus Mesosa. It is known from Taiwan.
