= Cacia vanikorensis =

Scientific classification
- Kingdom: Animalia
- Phylum: Arthropoda
- Clade: Pancrustacea
- Class: Insecta
- Order: Coleoptera
- Suborder: Polyphaga
- Infraorder: Cucujiformia
- Family: Cerambycidae
- Genus: Cacia
- Species: C. vanikorensis

Binomial name
- Cacia vanikorensis (Boisduval, 1835)

Synonyms
- Cacia ligatoides Schwarzer, 1926

Species of beetle

Cacia vanikorensis is a species of beetle in the family Cerambycidae. It was described by Jean Baptiste Boisduval in 1835. It is known from Sulawesi.
