= Cacia salomonum =

Scientific classification
- Kingdom: Animalia
- Phylum: Arthropoda
- Class: Insecta
- Order: Coleoptera
- Suborder: Polyphaga
- Infraorder: Cucujiformia
- Family: Cerambycidae
- Genus: Cacia
- Species: C. salomonum

Binomial name
- Cacia salomonum Aurivillius, 1921

Species of beetle

Cacia salomonum is a species of beetle in the family Cerambycidae. It was described by Per Olof Christopher Aurivillius in 1921 and is known from the Solomon Islands.
