= Cacia tonkinensis =

Scientific classification
- Kingdom: Animalia
- Phylum: Arthropoda
- Class: Insecta
- Order: Coleoptera
- Suborder: Polyphaga
- Infraorder: Cucujiformia
- Family: Cerambycidae
- Genus: Cacia
- Species: C. tonkinensis

Binomial name
- Cacia tonkinensis Pic, 1926

Species of beetle

Cacia tonkinensis is a species of beetle in the family Cerambycidae. It was described by Maurice Pic in 1926. It is known from Vietnam.
