= Cacia collarti =

Scientific classification
- Kingdom: Animalia
- Phylum: Arthropoda
- Class: Insecta
- Order: Coleoptera
- Suborder: Polyphaga
- Infraorder: Cucujiformia
- Family: Cerambycidae
- Genus: Cacia
- Species: C. collarti

Binomial name
- Cacia collarti Breuning, 1960

Species of beetle

Cacia collarti is a species of beetle in the family Cerambycidae. It was described by Stephan von Breuning in 1960. It originates from the island of Borneo.
