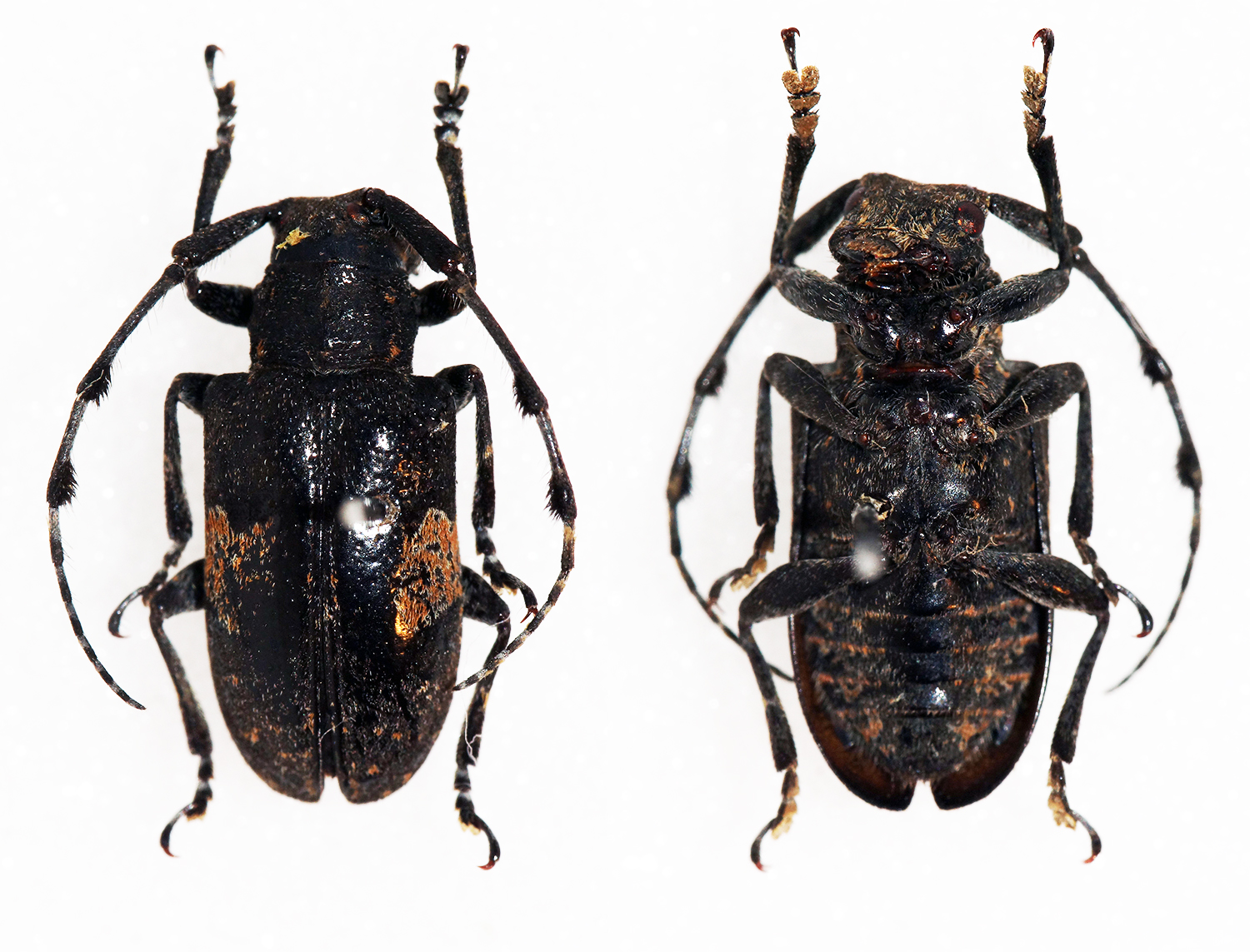

Scientific classification
- Kingdom: Animalia
- Phylum: Arthropoda
- Class: Insecta
- Order: Coleoptera
- Suborder: Polyphaga
- Infraorder: Cucujiformia
- Family: Cerambycidae
- Genus: Cacia
- Species: C. cretifera

Binomial name
- Cacia cretifera (Hope, 1831)

Synonyms
- Cacia incensa Pascoe, 1865; Lamia cretifera Hope, 1831

= Cacia cretifera =

Species of beetle

Cacia cretifera is a species of beetle in the family Cerambycidae. It was described by Frederick William Hope in 1831. It is known from Java, Cambodia, India, Myanmar, China, Nepal, Thailand, Laos, and Vietnam. It feeds on Berberis thunbergii and Albizia julibrissin.

== Subspecies ==
- Cacia cretifera cretifera (Hope, 1831)
- Cacia cretifera griseostictica Breuning, 1939
- Cacia cretifera javanica Breuning, 1963
- Cacia cretifera thibetana (Pic, 1917)
