= Cacia cephalotes =

Scientific classification
- Kingdom: Animalia
- Phylum: Arthropoda
- Class: Insecta
- Order: Coleoptera
- Suborder: Polyphaga
- Infraorder: Cucujiformia
- Family: Cerambycidae
- Genus: Cacia
- Species: C. cephalotes

Binomial name
- Cacia cephalotes (Pic, 1925)

Synonyms
- Falsoereis cephalotes Pic, 1925

Species of beetle

Cacia cephalotes is a species of beetle in the family Cerambycidae. It was described by Maurice Pic in 1925. It is known from Bhutan, India and Vietnam.
