= Cacia multiguttata =

Scientific classification
- Kingdom: Animalia
- Phylum: Arthropoda
- Clade: Pancrustacea
- Class: Insecta
- Order: Coleoptera
- Suborder: Polyphaga
- Infraorder: Cucujiformia
- Family: Cerambycidae
- Genus: Cacia
- Species: C. multiguttata

Binomial name
- Cacia multiguttata Breuning, 1968

Species of beetle

Cacia multiguttata is a species of beetle in the family Cerambycidae. It was described by Stephan von Breuning in 1968. It is known from Java.
