= Cacia shirupiti =

Scientific classification
- Kingdom: Animalia
- Phylum: Arthropoda
- Class: Insecta
- Order: Coleoptera
- Suborder: Polyphaga
- Infraorder: Cucujiformia
- Family: Cerambycidae
- Genus: Cacia
- Species: C. shirupiti

Binomial name
- Cacia shirupiti Kano, 1939

Species of beetle

Cacia shirupiti is a species of beetle in the family Cerambycidae. It was described by Kano in 1939. It is known from Taiwan.
