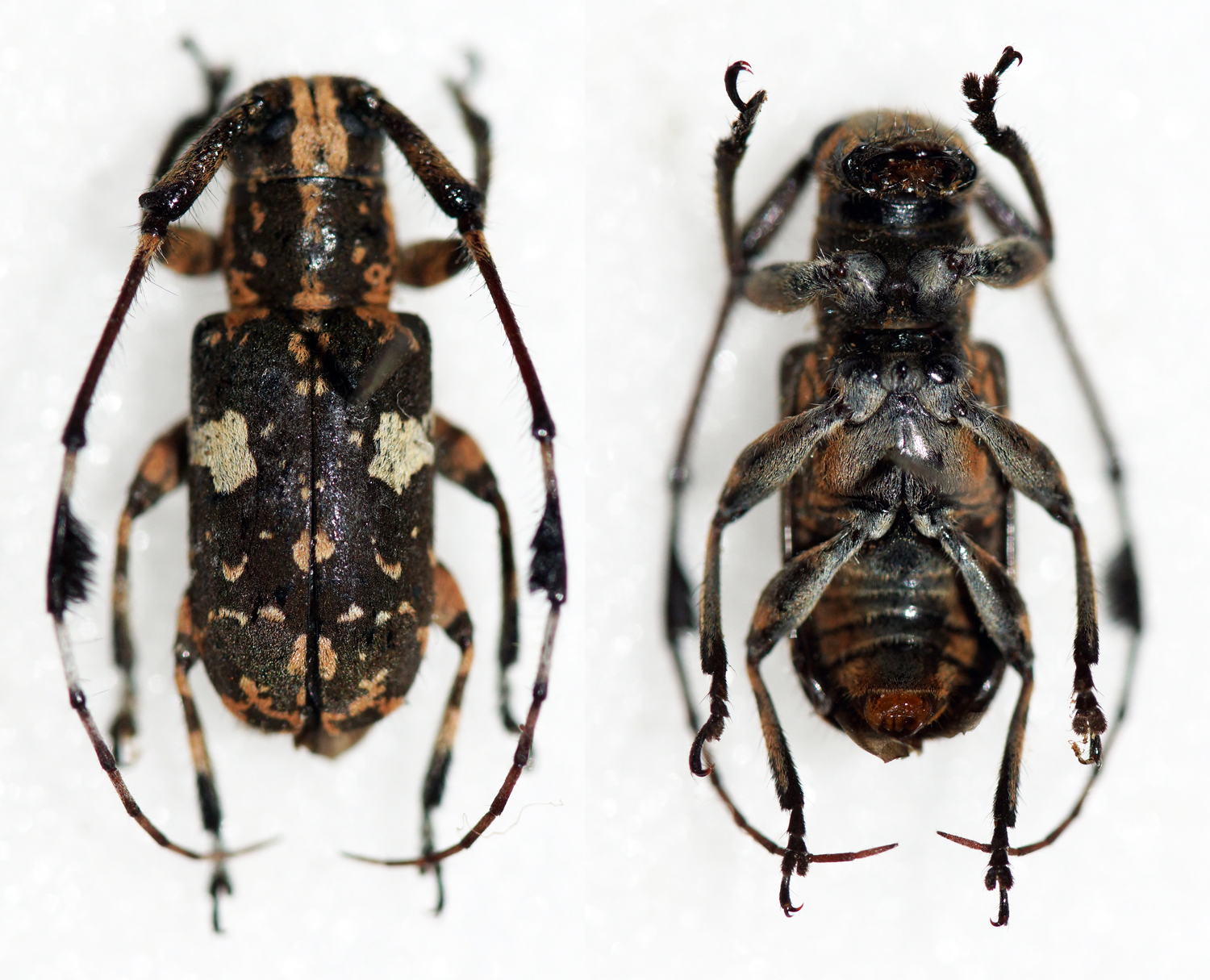
- Cacia parumpunctata

Scientific classification
- Domain: Eukaryota
- Kingdom: Animalia
- Phylum: Arthropoda
- Class: Insecta
- Order: Coleoptera
- Suborder: Polyphaga
- Infraorder: Cucujiformia
- Family: Cerambycidae
- Tribe: Mesosini
- Genus: Cacia; Newman, 1842

= Cacia (beetle) =

Genus of beetles

Cacia is a genus of longhorn beetles of the subfamily Lamiinae.

== Description ==
Cacia species typically are black with some kind of pale yellow patterns over the body and legs, usually thick spots or detailed speckles. Like other species in the subfamily Lamiinae, they have fairly pale markings, and their colors are not as bright yellow as some species within the family Cerambycidae, or longhorns. Cacia beetle antennae are slightly longer than the length of their bodies, compared to some Lamiinae with incredibly long antennae.

== Species ==
Cacia containing the following species:

subgenus Acanthocacia

- Cacia bispinosa Aurivillius, 1911
- Cacia collarti Breuning, 1960
- Cacia compta Pascoe, 1865
- Cacia flavoguttata Breuning, 1968
- Cacia flavovariegata Breuning, 1974
- Cacia guttata (Aurivillius, 1927)
- Cacia melanopsis Pascoe, 1866
- Cacia multiguttata Breuning, 1968
- Cacia picticornis Pascoe, 1858
- Cacia salomonum Aurivillius, 1921
- Cacia singaporensis Breuning, 1974

subgenus Cacia

- Cacia anancyloides Breuning, 1958
- Cacia bioculata Heller, 1923
- Cacia celebensis Breuning, 1938
- Cacia confusa Pascoe, 1857
- Cacia curta Breuning, 1935
- Cacia estrellae Hüdepohl, 1989
- Cacia evittata Breuning, 1924
- Cacia flavobasalis Breuning, 1938
- Cacia flavomaculipennis Breuning, 1974
- Cacia fruhstorferi Breuning, 1969
- Cacia griseovittata Breuning, 1974
- Cacia grossepunctata Breuning, 1980
- Cacia hebridarum Breuning, 1970
- Cacia herbacea Pascoe, 1866
- Cacia inculta Pascoe, 1857
- Cacia intermedia Heller, 1923
- Cacia intricata Pascoe, 1865
- Cacia kaszabi Breuning, 1954
- Cacia kinabaluensis Breuning, 1982
- Cacia niasica Breuning, 1974
- Cacia palawanica Breuning, 1936
- Cacia parintricata Breuning, 1982
- Cacia proteus Heller, 1915
- Cacia sarawakensis Breuning, 1938
- Cacia spinigera Newman, 1842
- Cacia strellae Hüdepohl, 1989
- Cacia triangularis Breuning, 1980
- Cacia trimaculata Breuning, 1947

subgenus Coreothrophora

- Cacia aequifasciata Heller, 1924
- Cacia albicollis Heller, 1923
- Cacia albofasciata Breuning, 1980
- Cacia aspersa Newman, 1842
- Cacia elegans Breuning, 1939
- Cacia imitatrix Heller, 1923
- Cacia interruptovittata Heller, 1923
- Cacia latefasciata Breuning, 1947
- Cacia ligata Schwarzer, 1924
- Cacia lumawigi Hüdepohl, 1989
- Cacia marionae Hüdepohl, 1989
- Cacia milagrosae Hüdepohl, 1989
- Cacia nigricollis Heller, 1923
- Cacia nigroabdominalis Heller, 1923
- Cacia ochraceomaculata Breuning, 1936
- Cacia parelegans Breuning, 1982
- Cacia parumpunctata Heller, 1923
- Cacia semiluctuosa Blanchard, 1853
- Cacia sexplagiata Heller, 1924
- Cacia shirupiti Kano, 1939
- Cacia vanikorensis (Boisduval, 1835)

subgenus Ipocregyes

- Cacia albocancellata Breuning, 1974
- Cacia albovariegata Breuning, 1935
- Cacia andamanica Breuning, 1935
- Cacia arisana (Kano, 1933)
- Cacia assamensis Breuning, 1948
- Cacia basialboantennalis Breuning, 1958
- Cacia basifasciata Breuning, 1939
- Cacia batoensis Breuning, 1956
- Cacia beccarii Gahan, 1907
- Cacia binaluanica Breuning, 1966
- Cacia bituberosa Breuning, 1935
- Cacia bootanana Breuning, 1968
- Cacia brunnea Breuning, 1939
- Cacia butuana Heller, 1923
- Cacia cephaloides Breuning, 1968
- Cacia cephalotes (Pic, 1925)
- Cacia colambugana Heller, 1923
- Cacia flavipennis Breuning, 1947
- Cacia flavomarmorata Breuning, 1939
- Cacia formosana (Schwarzer, 1925)
- Cacia grisescens Breuning, 1935
- Cacia hieroglyphica Heller, 1923
- Cacia imogenae Hüdepohl, 1989
- Cacia integricornis Schwarzer, 1930
- Cacia lacrimosa Heller, 1923
- Cacia lepesmei Gressitt, 1951
- Cacia malaccensis Breuning, 1935
- Cacia monstrabilis Heller, 1915
- Cacia newmanni Pascoe, 1857
- Cacia nigrofasciata Gressitt, 1940
- Cacia nigrohumeralis Breuning, 1939
- Cacia obliquelineata Breuning, 1950
- Cacia obsessa Pascoe, 1866
- Cacia ochreosignata Breuning, 1938
- Cacia perahensis Breuning, 1968
- Cacia postmediofasciata Breuning, 1947
- Cacia rosacea Heller, 1923
- Cacia scenica Pascoe, 1865
- Cacia semilactea Heller, 1923
- Cacia setulosa Pascoe, 1857
- Cacia sibuyana Heller, 1923
- Cacia spilota Gahan, 1907
- Cacia subcephalotes Breuning, 1968
- Cacia subfasciata Schwarzer, 1930
- Cacia suturefasciata Breuning, 1947
- Cacia suturevitta Breuning, 1963
- Cacia transversefasciata Breuning, 1947
- Cacia triangulifera Heller, 1900
- Cacia ulula Heller, 1915
- Cacia unda Heller, 1923
- Cacia vermiculata Heller, 1923
- Cacia watantakkuni (Kano, 1933)
- Cacia xenoceroides Heller, 1915
- Cacia yunnana Breuning, 1938

subgenus Pericacia

- Cacia cretifera (Hope, 1831)
- Cacia fasciolata (Boisduval, 1835)

subgenus Pseudocacia

- Cacia tonkinensis Pic, 1926

subgenus Spinocacia

- Cacia coomani Breuning, 1958
- Cacia olivacea Breuning, 1935
