= Cacia suturevitta =

Scientific classification
- Kingdom: Animalia
- Phylum: Arthropoda
- Class: Insecta
- Order: Coleoptera
- Suborder: Polyphaga
- Infraorder: Cucujiformia
- Family: Cerambycidae
- Genus: Cacia
- Species: C. suturevitta

Binomial name
- Cacia suturevitta Breuning, 1963

Species of beetle

Cacia suturevitta is a species of beetle in the family Cerambycidae. It was described by Stephan von Breuning in 1963. It is known from Laos.
