= Cacia watantakkuni =

Scientific classification
- Kingdom: Animalia
- Phylum: Arthropoda
- Class: Insecta
- Order: Coleoptera
- Suborder: Polyphaga
- Infraorder: Cucujiformia
- Family: Cerambycidae
- Genus: Cacia
- Species: C. watantakkuni

Binomial name
- Cacia watantakkuni (Kano, 1933)

Species of beetle

Cacia watantakkuni is a species of beetle in the family Cerambycidae. It was described by Kano in 1933. It is from Taiwan.
