= Cacia sexplagiata =

Scientific classification
- Kingdom: Animalia
- Phylum: Arthropoda
- Class: Insecta
- Order: Coleoptera
- Suborder: Polyphaga
- Infraorder: Cucujiformia
- Family: Cerambycidae
- Genus: Cacia
- Species: C. sexplagiata

Binomial name
- Cacia sexplagiata Heller, 1924

Species of beetle

Cacia sexplagiata is a species of beetle in the family Cerambycidae. It was described by Heller in 1924. It is known from the Philippines.
