= Cacia picticornis =

Scientific classification
- Kingdom: Animalia
- Phylum: Arthropoda
- Class: Insecta
- Order: Coleoptera
- Suborder: Polyphaga
- Infraorder: Cucujiformia
- Family: Cerambycidae
- Genus: Cacia
- Species: C. picticornis

Binomial name
- Cacia picticornis Pascoe, 1858

Synonyms
- Cacia undulata Heller, 1923

Species of beetle

Cacia picticornis is a species of beetle in the family Cerambycidae. It was described by Francis Polkinghorne Pascoe in 1858. It is known from Borneo.
