= Cacia sibuyana =

Scientific classification
- Kingdom: Animalia
- Phylum: Arthropoda
- Class: Insecta
- Order: Coleoptera
- Suborder: Polyphaga
- Infraorder: Cucujiformia
- Family: Cerambycidae
- Genus: Cacia
- Species: C. sibuyana

Binomial name
- Cacia sibuyana Heller, 1923

Species of beetle

Cacia sibuyana is a species of beetle in the family Cerambycidae. It was described by Heller in 1923. It is known from the Philippines.
