= Cacia newmanni =

Scientific classification
- Kingdom: Animalia
- Phylum: Arthropoda
- Class: Insecta
- Order: Coleoptera
- Suborder: Polyphaga
- Infraorder: Cucujiformia
- Family: Cerambycidae
- Genus: Cacia
- Species: C. newmanni

Binomial name
- Cacia newmanni Pascoe, 1857

Synonyms
- Ipocregyes newmanni (Pascoe, 1857)

Species of beetle

Cacia newmanni is a species of beetle in the family Cerambycidae first described by Francis Polkinghorne Pascoe in 1857. It occurs in Singapore, Borneo and Malaysia.
