= Cacia arisana =

Scientific classification
- Kingdom: Animalia
- Phylum: Arthropoda
- Class: Insecta
- Order: Coleoptera
- Suborder: Polyphaga
- Infraorder: Cucujiformia
- Family: Cerambycidae
- Genus: Cacia
- Species: C. arisana

Binomial name
- Cacia arisana (Kano, 1933)

Synonyms
- Cenodocus scopiferus Mitono, 1934

Species of beetle

Cacia arisana is a species of beetle in the family Cerambycidae. It was described by Kano in 1933. It is known from Taiwan.
