= Cacia flavoguttata =

Scientific classification
- Kingdom: Animalia
- Phylum: Arthropoda
- Class: Insecta
- Order: Coleoptera
- Suborder: Polyphaga
- Infraorder: Cucujiformia
- Family: Cerambycidae
- Genus: Cacia
- Species: C. flavoguttata

Binomial name
- Cacia flavoguttata Breuning, 1968

Species of beetle

Cacia flavoguttata is a species of beetle in the family Cerambycidae. It was described by Stephan von Breuning in 1968. It is known from Laos.
