= Cacia monstrabilis =

Scientific classification
- Kingdom: Animalia
- Phylum: Arthropoda
- Clade: Pancrustacea
- Class: Insecta
- Order: Coleoptera
- Suborder: Polyphaga
- Infraorder: Cucujiformia
- Family: Cerambycidae
- Genus: Cacia
- Species: C. monstrabilis

Binomial name
- Cacia monstrabilis Heller, 1915

Species of beetle

Cacia monstrabilis is a species of beetle in the family Cerambycidae. It was described by Heller in 1915. It is known from Sulawesi.
