= Cacia hebridarum =

Scientific classification
- Kingdom: Animalia
- Phylum: Arthropoda
- Class: Insecta
- Order: Coleoptera
- Suborder: Polyphaga
- Infraorder: Cucujiformia
- Family: Cerambycidae
- Genus: Cacia
- Species: C. hebridarum

Binomial name
- Cacia hebridarum Breuning, 1970

Species of beetle

Cacia hebridarum is a species of beetle in the family Cerambycidae. It was described by Stephan von Breuning in 1970. It is known from Vanuatu.
