= Cacia inculta =

Scientific classification
- Kingdom: Animalia
- Phylum: Arthropoda
- Class: Insecta
- Order: Coleoptera
- Suborder: Polyphaga
- Infraorder: Cucujiformia
- Family: Cerambycidae
- Genus: Cacia
- Species: C. inculta

Binomial name
- Cacia inculta Pascoe, 1857

Species of beetle

Cacia inculta is a species of beetle in the family Cerambycidae. It was described by Francis Polkinghorne Pascoe in 1857.

== Subspecies ==
- Cacia inculta inculta Pascoe, 1857
- Cacia inculta inspinosa Breuning, 1939
