= Cacia olivacea =

Scientific classification
- Kingdom: Animalia
- Phylum: Arthropoda
- Class: Insecta
- Order: Coleoptera
- Suborder: Polyphaga
- Infraorder: Cucujiformia
- Family: Cerambycidae
- Genus: Cacia
- Species: C. olivacea

Binomial name
- Cacia olivacea Breuning, 1935

Species of beetle

Cacia olivacea is a species of beetle in the family Cerambycidae. It was described by Stephan von Breuning in 1935. It is known from Cambodia.
