= Cacia spinigera =

Scientific classification
- Kingdom: Animalia
- Phylum: Arthropoda
- Class: Insecta
- Order: Coleoptera
- Suborder: Polyphaga
- Infraorder: Cucujiformia
- Family: Cerambycidae
- Genus: Cacia
- Species: C. spinigera

Binomial name
- Cacia spinigera Newman, 1842

Species of beetle

Cacia spinigera is a species of beetle in the family Cerambycidae. It was described by Newman in 1842. It is known from the Philippines.
