= Cacia semiluctuosa =

Scientific classification
- Kingdom: Animalia
- Phylum: Arthropoda
- Class: Insecta
- Order: Coleoptera
- Suborder: Polyphaga
- Infraorder: Cucujiformia
- Family: Cerambycidae
- Genus: Cacia
- Species: C. semiluctuosa

Binomial name
- Cacia semiluctuosa Blanchard, 1853

Synonyms
- Cacia anthriboides Pascoe, 1860; Cacia histrionica Pascoe, 1862; Corethrophora semiluctuosa Blanchard, 1855

Species of beetle

Cacia semiluctuosa is a species of beetle in the family Cerambycidae. It was described by Émile Blanchard in 1853.

== Subspecies ==
- Cacia semiluctuosa reducta Breuning, 1939
- Cacia semiluctuosa semiluctuosa Blanchard, 1853
