= List of Cryptorhynchus species =

This is a list of 488 species in Cryptorhynchus, a genus of hidden snout weevils in the family Curculionidae.

== Cryptorhynchus species ==
- Cryptorhynchus abbreviatulus Billberg, 1820^{c}
- Cryptorhynchus abdominalis Schoenherr, 1826^{c}
- Cryptorhynchus adspersus Dejean, 1821^{c}
- Cryptorhynchus aequicollis Fiedler, 1941^{c}
- Cryptorhynchus affaber Boheman, 1844^{c}
- Cryptorhynchus affinis Sturm, 1826^{c}
- Cryptorhynchus albicollis Germar, 1848^{c}
- Cryptorhynchus albifrons Boheman, 1837^{c}
- Cryptorhynchus albipes Boheman, 1837^{c}
- Cryptorhynchus albocaudatus Rosenschoeld, 1837^{c}
- Cryptorhynchus albofasciatus Dejean, 1836^{c}
- Cryptorhynchus albonotatus Klug, J.C.F., 1829^{c g}
- Cryptorhynchus alboscapularis Fiedler, 1941^{c}
- Cryptorhynchus alboscutosus Fiedler, 1941^{c}
- Cryptorhynchus albosparsus Fiedler, 1941^{c}
- Cryptorhynchus alpinus Gistl, J., 1831^{c}
- Cryptorhynchus alternans Dejean, 1821^{c}
- Cryptorhynchus altifrons Fiedler, 1941^{c}
- Cryptorhynchus amictus Boheman, 1844^{c}
- Cryptorhynchus amoenus Dejean, 1821^{c}
- Cryptorhynchus amplicollis Boheman, 1844^{c}
- Cryptorhynchus anaglypticus Say, 1831^{c}
- Cryptorhynchus anceps Boheman, 1837^{c}
- Cryptorhynchus annosus Scudder, S.H., 1876^{c g}
- Cryptorhynchus annulatus Fiedler, 1941^{c}
- Cryptorhynchus antares Erichson, 1842^{c}
- Cryptorhynchus antiquus Erichson, 1842^{c}
- Cryptorhynchus apicalis Klug, J.C.F., 1829^{c g}
- Cryptorhynchus apicatus Germar, 1824^{c}
- Cryptorhynchus apicipennis Lea, 1913^{c}
- Cryptorhynchus apiculatus Gyllenhal, 1837^{c}
- Cryptorhynchus arachnodes Erichson, 1834^{c}
- Cryptorhynchus aratus Germar, 1824^{c}
- Cryptorhynchus areneus Schoenherr, 1825^{c}
- Cryptorhynchus argula Schoenherr, 1826^{c}
- Cryptorhynchus armigerus Cristofori & Jan, 1832^{c}
- Cryptorhynchus armipes Boheman, 1837^{c}
- Cryptorhynchus arnoldi Kirby, 1819^{c}
- Cryptorhynchus asper Boheman, 1837^{c}
- Cryptorhynchus asperatus Dejean, 1821^{c}
- Cryptorhynchus aspericollis Rosenschoeld, 1837^{c}
- Cryptorhynchus aspis Schoenherr, 1825^{c}
- Cryptorhynchus assimilans Walker, 1859^{c}
- Cryptorhynchus atricapillus ^{c}
- Cryptorhynchus atrobrunneus Fiedler, 1941^{c}
- Cryptorhynchus atrofasciatus Fiedler, 1941^{c}
- Cryptorhynchus atromaculatus Fiedler, 1941^{c}
- Cryptorhynchus atroplagiatus Fiedler, 1941^{c}
- Cryptorhynchus atropos Boheman, 1844^{c}
- Cryptorhynchus auritarsis Sturm, 1826^{c}
- Cryptorhynchus austerus Boheman, 1837^{c}
- Cryptorhynchus australis Boisduval, 1835^{c}
- Cryptorhynchus aversandus Boheman, 1837^{c}
- Cryptorhynchus axillaris Sturm, 1826^{c}
- Cryptorhynchus balteatus Dejean, 1821^{c}
- Cryptorhynchus batatae Waterhouse, 1850^{c}
- Cryptorhynchus betulinus Klug,^{c}
- Cryptorhynchus biangularis Rosenschoeld, 1837^{c}
- Cryptorhynchus bicaudatus Dejean, 1821^{c}
- Cryptorhynchus bicirculus Kirsch, 1869^{c}
- Cryptorhynchus bicoloratus Fiedler, 1941^{c}
- Cryptorhynchus bicostatus Sturm, 1826^{c}
- Cryptorhynchus bifasciatus Hope,^{c}
- Cryptorhynchus biguttulus Fiedler, 1941^{c}
- Cryptorhynchus bilunaris Erichson, 1847^{c}
- Cryptorhynchus binotatus Schneider, 1828^{c}
- Cryptorhynchus biornatus Fiedler, 1941^{c}
- Cryptorhynchus bisignatus Say, 1831^{c}
- Cryptorhynchus bistrigirostris Boheman, 1837^{c}
- Cryptorhynchus bitrapezoides Fiedler, 1941^{c}
- Cryptorhynchus bitriangulum Fiedler, 1941^{c}
- Cryptorhynchus bituberculatus White, 1843^{c}
- Cryptorhynchus bohemani Boheman, 1837^{c}
- Cryptorhynchus bombina Dejean, 1821^{c}
- Cryptorhynchus bonsdorffii Rosenschoeld, 1837^{c}
- Cryptorhynchus borraginis Billberg, 1820^{c}
- Cryptorhynchus brevipes Sturm, 1826^{c}
- Cryptorhynchus brevirostris Fiedler, 1941^{c}
- Cryptorhynchus brevis Rosenschoeld, 1837^{c}
- Cryptorhynchus breyeri Brèthes, 1910^{c}
- Cryptorhynchus brunneus Fiedler, 1941^{c}
- Cryptorhynchus bullatus Germar,^{c}
- Cryptorhynchus calcaratus Boheman, 1844^{c}
- Cryptorhynchus calidus Germar, 1824^{c}
- Cryptorhynchus camelus Dejean, 1821^{c}
- Cryptorhynchus capensis Dejean,^{c}
- Cryptorhynchus capistratus Sturm, 1826^{c}
- Cryptorhynchus capucinus Chevrolat, 1880^{c}
- Cryptorhynchus carbonarius Sturm, 1826^{c}
- Cryptorhynchus carinatus Dejean, 1821^{c}
- Cryptorhynchus carinellus Boheman, 1837^{c}
- Cryptorhynchus cariosus Erichson, 1842^{c}
- Cryptorhynchus castigatus Boheman, 1837^{c}
- Cryptorhynchus caudex Boheman, 1837^{c}
- Cryptorhynchus cavernosus Boheman, 1837^{c}
- Cryptorhynchus cerdo Fiedler, 1941^{c}
- Cryptorhynchus cinctellus Rosenschoeld, 1837^{c}
- Cryptorhynchus cingillum Gyllenhal, 1837^{c}
- Cryptorhynchus cingulum Gemminger & Harold, 1871^{c}
- Cryptorhynchus circulus Boheman, 1837^{c}
- Cryptorhynchus clathratus Schoenherr, 1825^{c g}
- Cryptorhynchus clericus Chevrolat, 1880^{c}
- Cryptorhynchus clitellarius Boheman, 1837^{c}
- Cryptorhynchus clunifex Chevrolat,^{c}
- Cryptorhynchus coecus Schoenherr, 1837^{c}
- Cryptorhynchus coloradensis Wickham, H.F., 1912^{c g}
- Cryptorhynchus compactus Dejean, 1821^{c}
- Cryptorhynchus compernis Germar, 1824^{c}
- Cryptorhynchus concretus Dejean, 1821^{c}
- Cryptorhynchus conicollis Boheman, 1844^{c}
- Cryptorhynchus consobrinus Rosenschoeld, 1837^{c}
- Cryptorhynchus cordifer Boheman, 1844^{c}
- Cryptorhynchus cordiger Suffrian, 1876^{c}
- Cryptorhynchus corosus Boisduval, 1835^{c}
- Cryptorhynchus corruscans Kirby, 1819^{c}
- Cryptorhynchus corticalis Boheman, 1837^{c}
- Cryptorhynchus coruscans Kirby, W., 1818^{c}
- Cryptorhynchus costatus Dejean, 1821^{c}
- Cryptorhynchus costicollis Dejean, 1821^{c}
- Cryptorhynchus costiger Schneider, 1828^{c}
- Cryptorhynchus crassipes Schneider, 1828^{c}
- Cryptorhynchus cribricollis Say, 1831^{c}
- Cryptorhynchus crinitarsis Sturm, 1826^{c}
- Cryptorhynchus cristatus Dejean, 1821^{c}
- Cryptorhynchus crucifer Brèthes, 1910^{c}
- Cryptorhynchus crudus Boheman, 1837^{c}
- Cryptorhynchus crux Billberg, 1820^{c}
- Cryptorhynchus cubae Boheman, 1844^{c}
- Cryptorhynchus cucullatus Rosenschoeld, 1837^{c}
- Cryptorhynchus cylindraceus Boheman, 1837^{c}
- Cryptorhynchus cylindricornis Germar, 1824^{c}
- Cryptorhynchus cynicus Sturm, 1826^{c}
- Cryptorhynchus declaratus Walker, 1859^{c}
- Cryptorhynchus definitus Boheman, 1837^{c}
- Cryptorhynchus degluptus Germar, 1824^{c}
- Cryptorhynchus delirus Boheman, 1837^{c}
- Cryptorhynchus delumbatus Rosenschoeld, 1837^{c}
- Cryptorhynchus delumbis Germar, 1824^{c}
- Cryptorhynchus dentatus Sturm, 1826^{c}
- Cryptorhynchus denticollis Germar, 1824^{c}
- Cryptorhynchus dentipes Dejean, 1821^{c}
- Cryptorhynchus denutatus Sturm, 1826^{c}
- Cryptorhynchus depressirostris Germar, 1824^{c}
- Cryptorhynchus diabolicus Fiedler, 1941^{c}
- Cryptorhynchus didymus Billberg, 1820^{c}
- Cryptorhynchus difficilis Boheman, 1837^{c}
- Cryptorhynchus difformis Dejean, 1821^{c}
- Cryptorhynchus dimidiatus Dejean, 1821^{c}
- Cryptorhynchus diocletianus Germar, 1824^{c}
- Cryptorhynchus discicollis Rosenschoeld, 1837^{c}
- Cryptorhynchus discretus Fiedler, 1941^{c}
- Cryptorhynchus divergens Germar, 1824^{c}
- Cryptorhynchus diversus Boheman, 1837^{c}
- Cryptorhynchus dorsalis Dejean, 1821^{c}
- Cryptorhynchus dromedarius Boisduval, 1835^{c}
- Cryptorhynchus dubius Fiedler, 1941^{c}
- Cryptorhynchus duplicatus Rosenschoeld, 1837^{c}
- Cryptorhynchus echii Billberg, 1820^{c}
- Cryptorhynchus echinatus Dejean, 1821^{c}
- Cryptorhynchus elegans Say, 1831^{c}
- Cryptorhynchus elevatus Dejean, 1821^{c}
- Cryptorhynchus eminens Cristofori & Jan, 1832^{c}
- Cryptorhynchus ephippiatus Boheman, 1844^{c}
- Cryptorhynchus ephippiger Boisduval, 1835^{c}
- Cryptorhynchus equestris Fiedler, 1941^{c}
- Cryptorhynchus erinaceus Schoenherr, 1837^{c}
- Cryptorhynchus exasperatus Sturm, 1826^{c}
- Cryptorhynchus excavatus Dejean, 1821^{c}
- Cryptorhynchus exsculpticollis Fiedler, 1941^{c}
- Cryptorhynchus exter Kuschel, 1955^{c}
- Cryptorhynchus fallii Wickham, H.F., 1912^{c g}
- Cryptorhynchus fasciatus Sturm, 1826^{c}
- Cryptorhynchus fasciculaticollis Marshall, 1930^{c}
- Cryptorhynchus fasciculatus Dejean, 1821^{c}
- Cryptorhynchus fasciculifer Boheman, 1844^{c}
- Cryptorhynchus fasciculosus Rosenschoeld, 1837^{c}
- Cryptorhynchus femoralis Erichson, 1842^{c}
- Cryptorhynchus ferratus Say, 1831^{c}
- Cryptorhynchus fictus Boheman, 1837^{c}
- Cryptorhynchus fiedleri Papp, 1979^{c}
- Cryptorhynchus figulinus Germar,^{c}
- Cryptorhynchus flavescens Rosenschoeld, 1837^{c}
- Cryptorhynchus flavoscutellatus Boheman, 1844^{c}
- Cryptorhynchus foveaticollis Fiedler, 1941^{c}
- Cryptorhynchus foveatus Boheman, 1844^{c}
- Cryptorhynchus foveolatus Say, 1831^{c}
- Cryptorhynchus frigidus Schoenherr, 1837^{c}
- Cryptorhynchus frontalis Sturm, 1826^{c g}
- Cryptorhynchus fuliginosus Boisduval, 1835^{c}
- Cryptorhynchus fullo Steven, 1829^{c}
- Cryptorhynchus fumatus Sturm, 1826^{c}
- Cryptorhynchus fumosus Schneider, 1828^{c}
- Cryptorhynchus funebris Boheman, 1844^{c}
- Cryptorhynchus fuscatus LeConte, 1876^{i g b}
- Cryptorhynchus fuscus Sturm, 1826^{c}
- Cryptorhynchus gausapatus Boheman, 1837^{c}
- Cryptorhynchus gelasimus Boheman, 1837^{c}
- Cryptorhynchus geminatus Boheman, 1844^{c}
- Cryptorhynchus geminus Boheman, 1837^{c}
- Cryptorhynchus gentilis Fiedler, 1941^{c}
- Cryptorhynchus germari Boheman, 1837^{c}
- Cryptorhynchus gibber Dejean, 1821^{c}
- Cryptorhynchus gibbosus Cristofori & Jan, 1832^{c}
- Cryptorhynchus gibbus Schneider, 1828^{c}
- Cryptorhynchus globosus Dejean, 1821^{c}
- Cryptorhynchus gracilis Boheman, 1859^{c}
- Cryptorhynchus graminis Billberg, 1820^{c}
- Cryptorhynchus granosus Rosenschoeld, 1837^{c}
- Cryptorhynchus grisescens Sturm, 1826^{c}
- Cryptorhynchus griseus Sturm, 1826^{c}
- Cryptorhynchus grypus Illiger,^{c}
- Cryptorhynchus guadelupensis Rosenschoeld, 1837^{c}
- Cryptorhynchus guadulpensis Boheman, 1844^{c}
- Cryptorhynchus guttifer Boheman, 1844^{c}
- Cryptorhynchus gypsi Oustalet, E., 1874^{c g}
- Cryptorhynchus haemorrhoes Schoenherr, 1825^{c}
- Cryptorhynchus harrisoni Pool, 1917^{c}
- Cryptorhynchus hebes Dejean, 1821^{c}
- Cryptorhynchus helvus LeConte, 1878^{i g b}
- Cryptorhynchus hexacanthus Germar,^{c}
- Cryptorhynchus hirtus Cristofori & Jan, 1832^{c}
- Cryptorhynchus hispidulus Fiedler, 1941^{c}
- Cryptorhynchus hispidus Sturm, 1826^{c}
- Cryptorhynchus histrio Sturm, 1826^{c}
- Cryptorhynchus horridus Boheman, 1837^{c}
- Cryptorhynchus hospes Schoenherr,^{c}
- Cryptorhynchus humeralis Gyllenhal, 1837^{c}
- Cryptorhynchus humilis Dejean, 1821^{c}
- Cryptorhynchus hurdi Zimmerman, 1972^{c}
- Cryptorhynchus hypocrita Dejean, 1821^{c}
- Cryptorhynchus illex Germar, 1824^{c}
- Cryptorhynchus illicitus Boheman, 1837^{c}
- Cryptorhynchus illotus Boheman, 1837^{c}
- Cryptorhynchus imbellis Germar, 1824^{c}
- Cryptorhynchus impexus Boheman, 1837^{c}
- Cryptorhynchus impluviatus Germar, 1824^{c}
- Cryptorhynchus impuratus Boheman, 1837^{c}
- Cryptorhynchus inaequalis Dejean, 1821^{c}
- Cryptorhynchus incertus Fiedler, 1941^{c}
- Cryptorhynchus indecorus Rosenschoeld, 1837^{c}
- Cryptorhynchus ineptus Boheman, 1837^{c}
- Cryptorhynchus infarctus Boheman, 1837^{c}
- Cryptorhynchus informis Germar, 1824^{c}
- Cryptorhynchus infulatus Erichson, 1842^{c}
- Cryptorhynchus inglorius Boheman, 1837^{c}
- Cryptorhynchus inquinatus Schoenherr, 1826^{c}
- Cryptorhynchus insanius Boheman, 1844^{c}
- Cryptorhynchus insubidus Germar, 1824^{c}
- Cryptorhynchus insularis Rosenschoeld, 1837^{c}
- Cryptorhynchus interruptus Dejean, 1821^{c}
- Cryptorhynchus interstitialis Chevrolat, 1880^{c}
- Cryptorhynchus irroratus Schoenherr, 1825^{c}
- Cryptorhynchus jamaicensis Germar, 1824^{c}
- Cryptorhynchus kerri Scudder, 1893^{c}
- Cryptorhynchus kunzei Boheman, 1844^{c}
- Cryptorhynchus lacunicollis Boheman, 1844^{c}
- Cryptorhynchus lapathi (Linnaeus, 1758)^{i c g b} (poplar-and-willow borer)
- Cryptorhynchus lateralis Sturm, 1826^{c}
- Cryptorhynchus leachii Kirby, 1819^{c}
- Cryptorhynchus lemniscatus Boheman, 1837^{c}
- Cryptorhynchus lemur Germar, 1824^{c}
- Cryptorhynchus lentiginosus Germar, 1824^{c}
- Cryptorhynchus lepidotus Boheman, 1837^{c}
- Cryptorhynchus leucocephalus Boheman, 1844^{c}
- Cryptorhynchus leucocoma Latreille, 1813^{c}
- Cryptorhynchus leucomelas Boheman, 1837^{c}
- Cryptorhynchus leucophaeus Erichson, 1847^{c}
- Cryptorhynchus levidipus Boheman, 1837^{c}
- Cryptorhynchus levipidus Boheman, 1844^{c}
- Cryptorhynchus linariae Billberg, 1820^{c}
- Cryptorhynchus lineatocollis Sturm, 1826^{c}
- Cryptorhynchus lineola Sturm, 1826^{c}
- Cryptorhynchus liratus Boheman, 1837^{c}
- Cryptorhynchus lirinus Boheman, 1844^{c}
- Cryptorhynchus lithodermus Boisduval, 1835^{c}
- Cryptorhynchus litura Billberg, 1820^{c}
- Cryptorhynchus longus Blatchley & Leng, 1916^{c}
- Cryptorhynchus luctuosus Boheman, 1837^{c}
- Cryptorhynchus lutosus LeConte, 1884^{i g}
- Cryptorhynchus macropus Dejean, 1821^{c}
- Cryptorhynchus maculatus Sturm, 1826^{c}
- Cryptorhynchus mamillatus Say, 1831^{c}
- Cryptorhynchus mangiferae Dejean, 1821^{c}
- Cryptorhynchus marci Boheman, 1844^{c}
- Cryptorhynchus marginatus Billberg, 1820^{c}
- Cryptorhynchus metallinus Schoenherr, 1825^{c}
- Cryptorhynchus miles Cristofori & Jan, 1832^{c}
- Cryptorhynchus miniatus Boheman, 1837^{c}
- Cryptorhynchus minutissimus LeConte, 1876^{i g}
- Cryptorhynchus misellus Boheman, 1837^{c}
- Cryptorhynchus mitis Germar, 1824^{c}
- Cryptorhynchus modestus Dejean, 1821^{c}
- Cryptorhynchus moestus Boheman, 1844^{c}
- Cryptorhynchus monachus Boisduval, 1835^{c}
- Cryptorhynchus morbillosus Dejean, 1821^{c}
- Cryptorhynchus morio Boheman, 1837^{c}
- Cryptorhynchus muriceus Germar, 1824^{c}
- Cryptorhynchus mutabilis Boheman, 1837^{c}
- Cryptorhynchus nasutus Fiedler, 1941^{c}
- Cryptorhynchus nebulosus Dejean, 1821^{c}
- Cryptorhynchus nenuphar Sturm, 1826^{c}
- Cryptorhynchus nigridorsis Sturm, 1826^{c}
- Cryptorhynchus nigrobrunneus Fiedler, 1941^{c}
- Cryptorhynchus nigromaculatus Fiedler, 1941^{c}
- Cryptorhynchus nitidulus Brèthes, 1910^{c}
- Cryptorhynchus niveifrons Schoenherr, 1845^{c}
- Cryptorhynchus nodulosus Sturm, 1826^{c}
- Cryptorhynchus nota Sturm, 1826^{c}
- Cryptorhynchus notabilis Walker, 1858^{c}
- Cryptorhynchus novalis Schoenherr, 1826^{c}
- Cryptorhynchus nubifer Boheman, 1837^{c}
- Cryptorhynchus nubilus Schneider, 1829^{c}
- Cryptorhynchus nudirostris Rosenschoeld, 1837^{c}
- Cryptorhynchus obliquefasciatus Boheman, 1844^{c}
- Cryptorhynchus obliquus Say, 1831^{i c b}
- Cryptorhynchus obsoletus Dejean, 1821^{c}
- Cryptorhynchus occatus Germar, 1824^{c}
- Cryptorhynchus ocellopunctatus Thomson, 1858^{c}
- Cryptorhynchus ochraceus Boheman, 1844^{c}
- Cryptorhynchus ochroleucus Germar, 1824^{c}
- Cryptorhynchus oculatus Say, 1824^{c}
- Cryptorhynchus opacus Fiedler, 1941^{g}
- Cryptorhynchus operculatus Say, 1824^{c}
- Cryptorhynchus orthodoxus Chevrolat, 1880^{c}
- Cryptorhynchus orthomastius Germar, 1824^{c}
- Cryptorhynchus otiosus Boheman, 1837^{c}
- Cryptorhynchus pallidicornis Chevrolat, 1880^{c}
- Cryptorhynchus palmacollis Say, 1831^{c}
- Cryptorhynchus palpebra Schoenherr, 1826^{c}
- Cryptorhynchus panchezi Hustache, 1936^{c}
- Cryptorhynchus papuanus Heller, 1916^{c}
- Cryptorhynchus pardalinus Dejean, 1821^{c}
- Cryptorhynchus pauper Fiedler, 1941^{c}
- Cryptorhynchus pavefactus Boheman, 1837^{c}
- Cryptorhynchus pectorestriatus Chevrolat,^{c}
- Cryptorhynchus perforatus Boheman, 1837^{c}
- Cryptorhynchus perinsignis Boheman, 1837^{c}
- Cryptorhynchus pertusus Boheman, 1844^{c}
- Cryptorhynchus piger Schoenherr, 1825^{c}
- Cryptorhynchus pilipes Schoenherr, 1825^{c}
- Cryptorhynchus pilosellus Boheman, 1844^{c}
- Cryptorhynchus pilosus Dejean, 1835^{c}
- Cryptorhynchus pinguis Fiedler, 1941^{c}
- Cryptorhynchus plagiatus Rosenschoeld, 1837^{c}
- Cryptorhynchus plagifer Boheman, 1844^{c}
- Cryptorhynchus planatus Fairmaire, 1849^{c}
- Cryptorhynchus planicollis Fiedler, 1941^{c}
- Cryptorhynchus planidorsis Thomson, 1858^{c}
- Cryptorhynchus planirostris Sturm, 1826^{c}
- Cryptorhynchus plumipes Champion, 1906^{c}
- Cryptorhynchus podagrosus Germar, 1824^{c}
- Cryptorhynchus poecilus Fiedler, 1941^{c}
- Cryptorhynchus pollinarius Billberg, 1820^{c}
- Cryptorhynchus pollinosus Dejean, 1821^{c}
- Cryptorhynchus porcatus Dejean, 1821^{c}
- Cryptorhynchus porcinus Dejean, 1821^{c}
- Cryptorhynchus porculeti Germar, 1824^{c}
- Cryptorhynchus porcus Schneider, 1828^{c}
- Cryptorhynchus porifer Rosenschoeld, 1837^{c}
- Cryptorhynchus porosus Boheman, 1837^{c}
- Cryptorhynchus porriginosus Germar, 1824^{c}
- Cryptorhynchus postfasciatus Fairmaire, 1849^{c}
- Cryptorhynchus posthumus Boheman, 1844^{c}
- Cryptorhynchus posticatus Say, 1831^{c}
- Cryptorhynchus posticus Boheman, 1844^{c}
- Cryptorhynchus postularius Boheman, 1844^{c}
- Cryptorhynchus profusus Scudder, 1893^{c}
- Cryptorhynchus protensus Fiedler, 1954^{g}
- Cryptorhynchus pudens Schoenherr, 1844^{c}
- Cryptorhynchus pumilus Boheman, 1837^{c}
- Cryptorhynchus punctulatus Sturm,^{c}
- Cryptorhynchus pusio Schoenherr, 1837^{c}
- Cryptorhynchus pustulatus Sturm,^{c}
- Cryptorhynchus quadrifoveatus Chevrolat, 1880^{c}
- Cryptorhynchus quadripunctatus Chevrolat, 1880^{c}
- Cryptorhynchus quadrivittatus Schoenherr, 1844^{c}
- Cryptorhynchus quercicola Billberg, 1820^{c}
- Cryptorhynchus querulus Boheman, 1837^{c}
- Cryptorhynchus raucus Dejean, 1821^{c}
- Cryptorhynchus ravus Boheman, 1844^{c}
- Cryptorhynchus reichei Boheman, 1844^{c}
- Cryptorhynchus renudus Heyden, C. von, 1862^{c g}
- Cryptorhynchus retentus Say, 1831^{c}
- Cryptorhynchus retusus Boheman, 1844^{c}
- Cryptorhynchus rhinoceros Chevrolat,^{c}
- Cryptorhynchus rigidus Rosenschoeld, 1837^{c}
- Cryptorhynchus roboris Curtis, 1829^{c}
- Cryptorhynchus rotundicollis Boheman, 1844^{c}
- Cryptorhynchus rubiginosus Dejean, 1821^{c}
- Cryptorhynchus rudis Rosenschoeld, 1837^{c}
- Cryptorhynchus ruficornis Sturm, 1826^{c}
- Cryptorhynchus rufoapicalis Fiedler, 1941^{c}
- Cryptorhynchus rufoscapularis Fiedler, 1941^{c}
- Cryptorhynchus rugatus Dejean, 1821^{c}
- Cryptorhynchus rugicollis Wibmer & O'Brien, 1986^{c}
- Cryptorhynchus rugulosus Billberg, 1820^{c}
- Cryptorhynchus rusticus Dejean, 1821^{c}
- Cryptorhynchus salicorniae Dejean, 1821^{c}
- Cryptorhynchus sanguinicollis Germar, E.F., 1824^{c}
- Cryptorhynchus scabratus Dejean, 1821^{c}
- Cryptorhynchus scapularis Rosenschoeld, 1837^{c}
- Cryptorhynchus sceleratus Boheman, 1837^{c}
- Cryptorhynchus schwarzi Blatchley & Leng, 1916^{c}
- Cryptorhynchus scorpio Dejean, 1821^{c}
- Cryptorhynchus scotias Germar,^{c}
- Cryptorhynchus scrobiculatus Motschulsky, 1853^{c}
- Cryptorhynchus scutellaris Fiedler, 1941^{c}
- Cryptorhynchus scutellatus Fiedler, 1941^{c}
- Cryptorhynchus sellatus Dejean, 1821^{c}
- Cryptorhynchus semicinctus Fiedler, 1941^{c}
- Cryptorhynchus semicircularis Champion, 1906^{c}
- Cryptorhynchus semicostatus Germar, 1824^{c}
- Cryptorhynchus senilis Schneider, 1828^{c}
- Cryptorhynchus septemtuberculatus Schoenherr, 1837^{c}
- Cryptorhynchus serius Rosenschoeld, 1837^{c}
- Cryptorhynchus serratus Germar, 1824^{c}
- Cryptorhynchus setarius Thomson, 1858^{c}
- Cryptorhynchus setifer Boh. in Schoenh., 1844^{c}
- Cryptorhynchus setiferus Boheman, 1844^{c}
- Cryptorhynchus setiger Boheman, 1837^{c}
- Cryptorhynchus setosus Sturm, 1826^{c}
- Cryptorhynchus sexlineatus Boheman, 1837^{c}
- Cryptorhynchus sextuberculatus Schoenherr, 1837^{c}
- Cryptorhynchus signatus Sturm, 1826^{c}
- Cryptorhynchus signifer Boheman, 1837^{c}
- Cryptorhynchus signum Sturm, 1826^{c}
- Cryptorhynchus simulatus Boheman, 1844^{c}
- Cryptorhynchus sirius Erichson, 1842^{c}
- Cryptorhynchus soleatus Germar, 1824^{c}
- Cryptorhynchus solidus Erichson, 1842^{c}
- Cryptorhynchus sordidulus Boheman, 1837^{c}
- Cryptorhynchus sparsipes Germar, 1824^{c}
- Cryptorhynchus spiculator Latreille, 1809^{c}
- Cryptorhynchus spiralis Fiedler, 1941^{c}
- Cryptorhynchus squalidus Dejean,^{c}
- Cryptorhynchus statua Germar, 1822^{c}
- Cryptorhynchus stephensi Hope,^{c}
- Cryptorhynchus sticticus Germar, 1824^{c}
- Cryptorhynchus stigma Dejean, 1821^{c}
- Cryptorhynchus stigmaticollis Dejean,^{c}
- Cryptorhynchus stipator Boheman, 1837^{c}
- Cryptorhynchus stipitosus Sturm, 1826^{c}
- Cryptorhynchus stipulator Schoenherr, 1844^{c}
- Cryptorhynchus strangulatus Boheman, 1844^{c}
- Cryptorhynchus strictus Rosenschoeld, 1837^{c}
- Cryptorhynchus striga Guerin-Meneville, 1831^{c}
- Cryptorhynchus stultus (Fabricius, J.C., 1787)^{c g}
- Cryptorhynchus subcarinatus Fiedler, 1941^{c}
- Cryptorhynchus subfasciatus Fiedler, 1941^{c}
- Cryptorhynchus subgibbosus Fiedler, 1941^{c}
- Cryptorhynchus submixtus Fiedler, 1941^{c}
- Cryptorhynchus subnotatus Boheman, 1837^{c}
- Cryptorhynchus subtuberculatus Fiedler, 1941^{c}
- Cryptorhynchus succisus Erichson, 1842^{c}
- Cryptorhynchus sulcicollis Billberg, 1820^{c}
- Cryptorhynchus superbus Dejean, 1821^{c}
- Cryptorhynchus suturalis Germar, 1821^{c}
- Cryptorhynchus terminatus Klug,^{c}
- Cryptorhynchus tesselatus Dejean, 1821^{c}
- Cryptorhynchus tibialis Schoenherr, 1825^{c}
- Cryptorhynchus tirunculus Boheman, 1837^{c}
- Cryptorhynchus torpescus Rosenschoeld, 1837^{c}
- Cryptorhynchus torvus Schoenherr,^{c}
- Cryptorhynchus triangularis Boheman, 1837^{c}
- Cryptorhynchus tribulosus Boheman, 1844^{c}
- Cryptorhynchus trilineatus Sturm, 1826^{c}
- Cryptorhynchus triloratus Germar,^{c}
- Cryptorhynchus trimaculatus Billberg, 1820^{c}
- Cryptorhynchus tristis LeConte, 1876^{i c g b}
- Cryptorhynchus troglodytes Billberg, 1820^{c}
- Cryptorhynchus tuberculatus Sturm, 1826^{c}
- Cryptorhynchus tubulatus Say, 1831^{c}
- Cryptorhynchus turpiculus Boheman, 1837^{c}
- Cryptorhynchus typhae Illiger,^{c}
- Cryptorhynchus umbrinus Fiedler, 1941^{c}
- Cryptorhynchus umbrosus Boheman, 1837^{c}
- Cryptorhynchus unicolor Rosenschoeld, 1837^{c}
- Cryptorhynchus urens Hoffmannsegg,^{c}
- Cryptorhynchus uroleucus Fiedler, 1941^{c}
- Cryptorhynchus vacca Sturm, 1826^{c}
- Cryptorhynchus vacillatus Boheman, 1837^{c}
- Cryptorhynchus vaginalis Dejean, 1821^{c}
- Cryptorhynchus variolosus Dejean, 1821^{c}
- Cryptorhynchus varipes Schoenherr, 1825^{c}
- Cryptorhynchus verruca Schoenherr, 1837^{c}
- Cryptorhynchus vestitus Rosenschoeld, 1837^{c}
- Cryptorhynchus woodruffi (Sleeper, 1955)^{i c}
- Cryptorhynchus ypsilon Boheman, 1837^{c}

Data sources: i = ITIS, c = Catalogue of Life, g = GBIF, b = Bugguide.net
