= Cryptorhynchus helvus =

Scientific classification
- Kingdom: Animalia
- Phylum: Arthropoda
- Class: Insecta
- Order: Coleoptera
- Suborder: Polyphaga
- Infraorder: Cucujiformia
- Family: Curculionidae
- Genus: Cryptorhynchus
- Species: C. helvus

Binomial name
- Cryptorhynchus helvus LeConte, 1878

Species of beetle

Cryptorhynchus helvus is a species of hidden snout weevil in the beetle family Curculionidae. It is found in North America.
