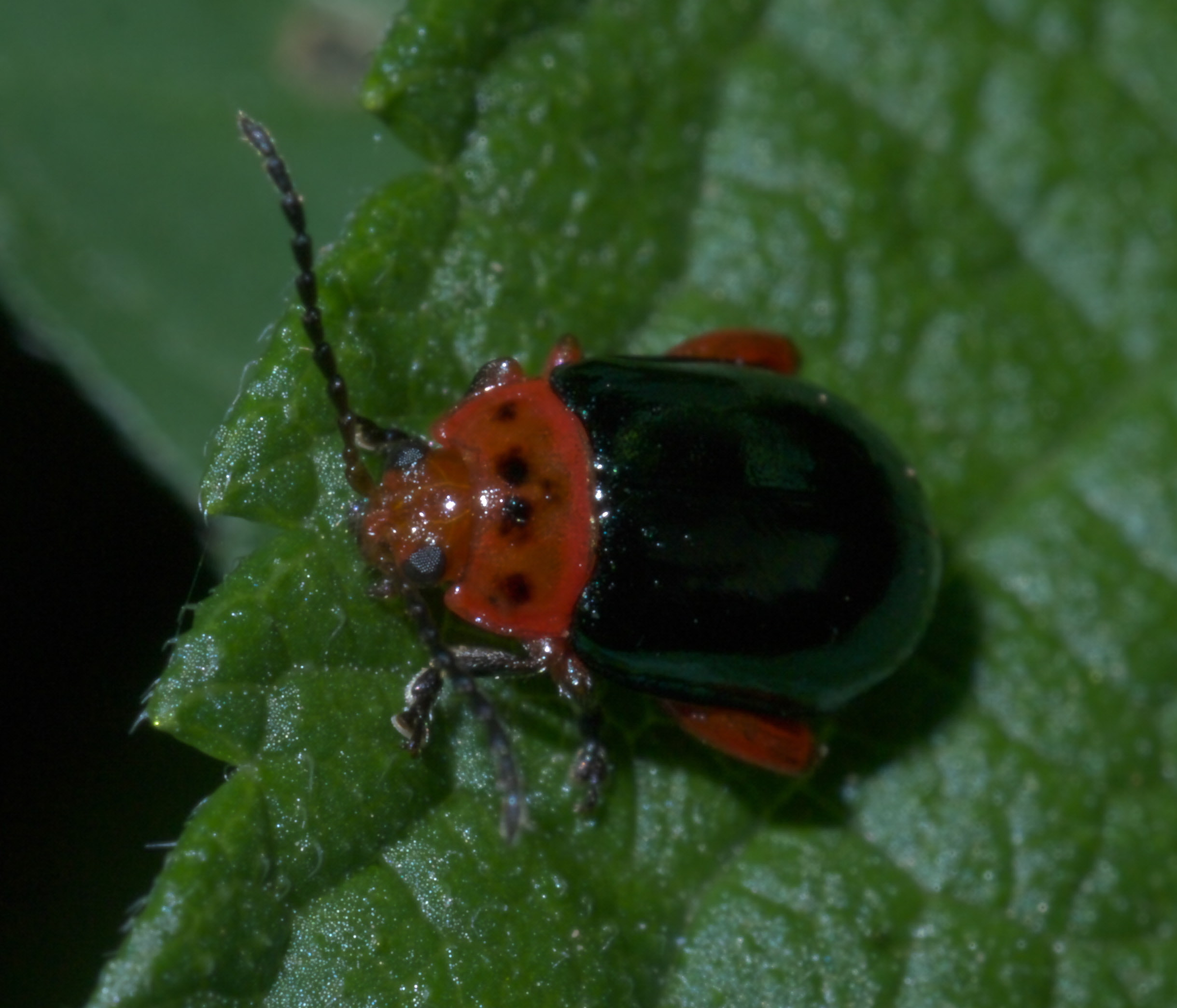

Scientific classification
- Kingdom: Animalia
- Phylum: Arthropoda
- Class: Insecta
- Order: Coleoptera
- Suborder: Polyphaga
- Infraorder: Cucujiformia
- Family: Chrysomelidae
- Genus: Kuschelina
- Species: K. gibbitarsa

Binomial name
- Kuschelina gibbitarsa (Say, 1824)

= Kuschelina gibbitarsa =

Species of beetle

Kuschelina gibbitarsa is a species of flea beetle in the family Chrysomelidae. It is found in North America.
