= Cryptorhynchus obliquus =

Scientific classification
- Domain: Eukaryota
- Kingdom: Animalia
- Phylum: Arthropoda
- Class: Insecta
- Order: Coleoptera
- Suborder: Polyphaga
- Infraorder: Cucujiformia
- Family: Curculionidae
- Genus: Cryptorhynchus
- Species: C. obliquus

Binomial name
- Cryptorhynchus obliquus Say, 1831

Synonyms
- Cryptorhynchus umbrosus Boheman, 1837

Species of beetle

Cryptorhynchus obliquus is a species of hidden snout weevil in the beetle family Curculionidae. It is found in North America.
