= Cryptorhynchus fuscatus =

Scientific classification
- Kingdom: Animalia
- Phylum: Arthropoda
- Class: Insecta
- Order: Coleoptera
- Suborder: Polyphaga
- Infraorder: Cucujiformia
- Family: Curculionidae
- Genus: Cryptorhynchus
- Species: C. fuscatus

Binomial name
- Cryptorhynchus fuscatus LeConte, 1876

Species of beetle

Cryptorhynchus fuscatus is a species of hidden snout weevil in the beetle family Curculionidae. It is found in North America.
