= Kuschelina ulkei =

Scientific classification
- Kingdom: Animalia
- Phylum: Arthropoda
- Class: Insecta
- Order: Coleoptera
- Suborder: Polyphaga
- Infraorder: Cucujiformia
- Family: Chrysomelidae
- Tribe: Alticini
- Genus: Kuschelina
- Species: K. ulkei

Binomial name
- Kuschelina ulkei (Horn, 1889)

Species of beetle

Kuschelina ulkei is a species of flea beetle in the family Chrysomelidae. It is found in North America.
