= Kuschelina lugens =

Scientific classification
- Kingdom: Animalia
- Phylum: Arthropoda
- Clade: Pancrustacea
- Class: Insecta
- Order: Coleoptera
- Suborder: Polyphaga
- Infraorder: Cucujiformia
- Family: Chrysomelidae
- Tribe: Alticini
- Genus: Kuschelina
- Species: K. lugens

Binomial name
- Kuschelina lugens (J. L. LeConte, 1859)

Species of beetle

Kuschelina lugens is a species of flea beetle in the family Chrysomelidae. It is found in North America.
