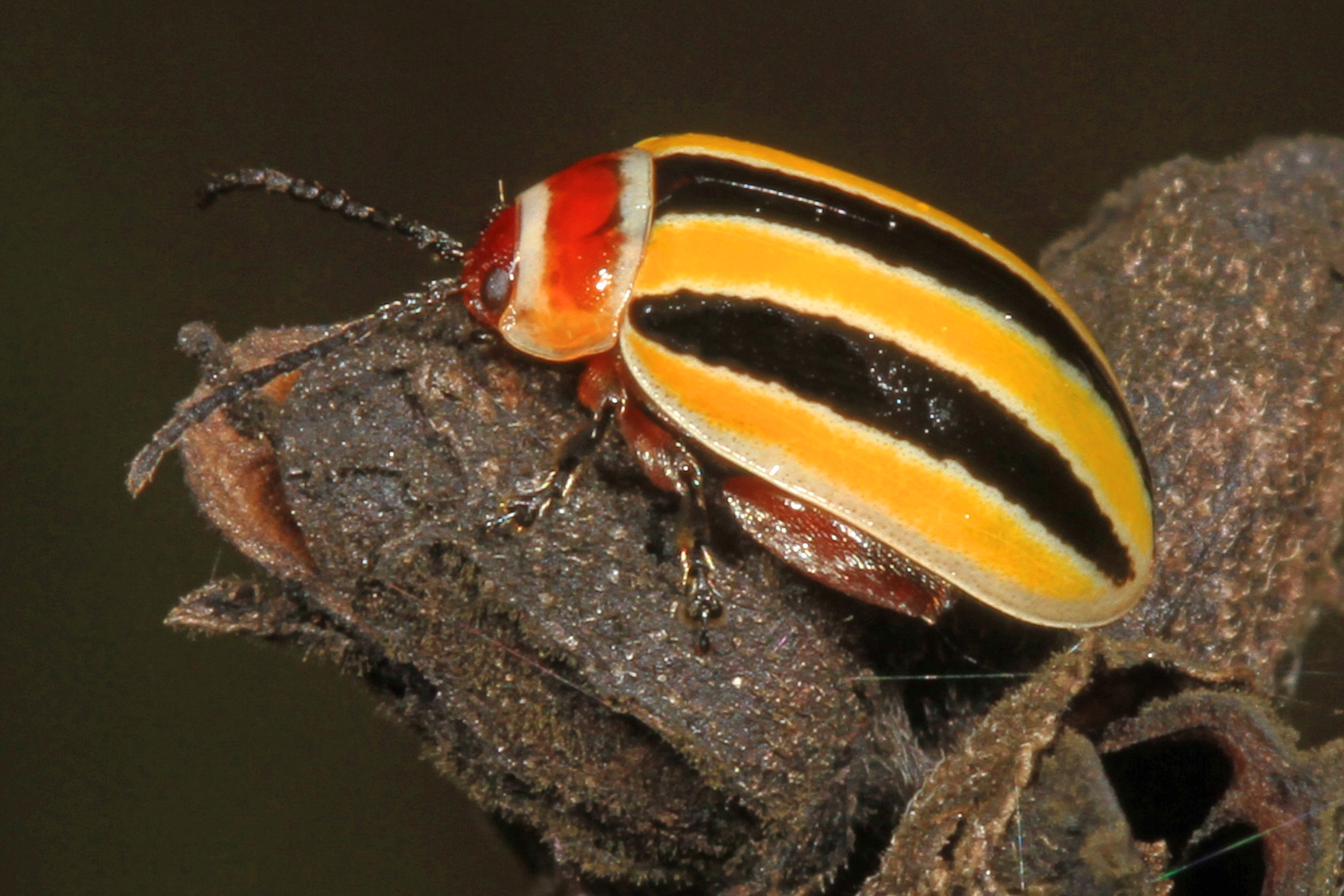
- Kuschelina floridana

Scientific classification
- Kingdom: Animalia
- Phylum: Arthropoda
- Class: Insecta
- Order: Coleoptera
- Suborder: Polyphaga
- Infraorder: Cucujiformia
- Family: Chrysomelidae
- Tribe: Alticini
- Genus: Kuschelina; J. Bechyné, 1951

= Kuschelina =

Genus of beetles

Kuschelina is a genus of flea beetles in the family Chrysomelidae. There are some 30 described species, from the Nearctic and Neotropics.

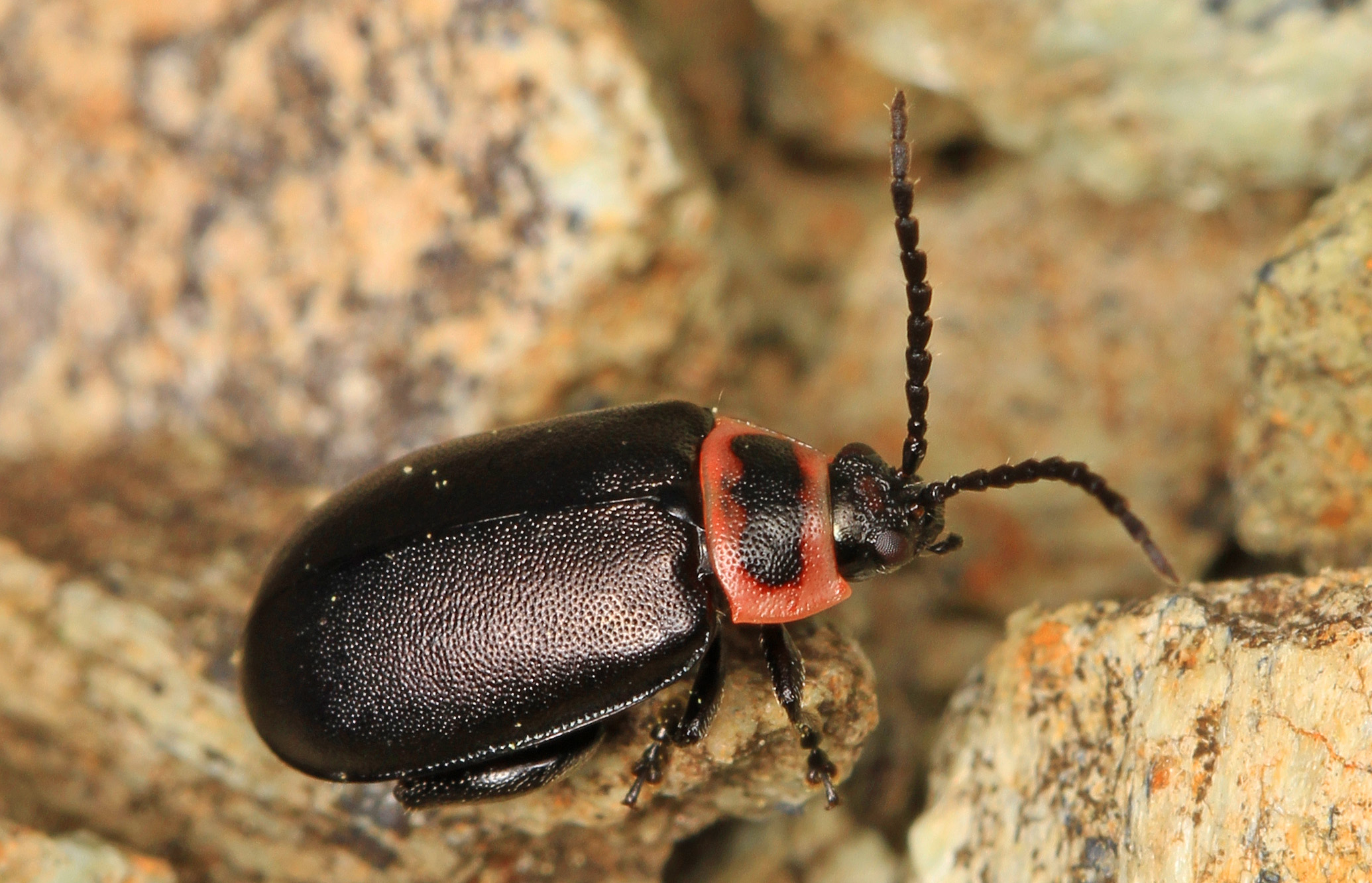
Kuschelina vians

== Selected species ==
- Kuschelina aemula (Horn, 1889)
- Kuschelina amplivittata (Blake, 1927)
- Kuschelina barberi (Blake, 1954)
- Kuschelina brachyscela (Blake, 1965)
- Kuschelina concinna (Fabricius, 1801)
- Kuschelina discicollis (Crotch, 1873)
- Kuschelina fallax (F. E. Melsheimer, 1847)
- Kuschelina fimbriata (Forster, 1771)
- Kuschelina flavocyanea (Crotch, 1873)
- Kuschelina floridana (Blake, 1954)
- Kuschelina gibbitarsa (Say, 1824) (flea beetle)
- Kuschelina horni (Harold, 1881)
- Kuschelina jacobiana (Horn, 1889)
- Kuschelina laeta (Perbosc, 1839)
- Kuschelina lateralis (Jacoby, 1886)
- Kuschelina lepida (Boheman 1859)
- Kuschelina lugens (J. L. LeConte, 1859)
- Kuschelina miniata (Fabricius, 1801)
- Kuschelina perplexa (Blake, 1954)
- Kuschelina petaurista (Fabricius, 1801)
- Kuschelina rhabdota (Blake, 1954)
- Kuschelina scripticollis (Say, 1824)
- Kuschelina suturella (Say, 1826)
- Kuschelina tenuilineata (Horn, 1889)
- Kuschelina thoracica (Fabricius, 1775)
- Kuschelina ulkei (Horn, 1889)
- Kuschelina vians (Illiger, 1807)
- Kuschelina violascens (J. L. LeConte, 1859)
- Kuschelina weismani (Blake, 1954)
