= Kuschelina thoracica =

Scientific classification
- Kingdom: Animalia
- Phylum: Arthropoda
- Class: Insecta
- Order: Coleoptera
- Suborder: Polyphaga
- Infraorder: Cucujiformia
- Family: Chrysomelidae
- Genus: Kuschelina
- Species: K. thoracica

Binomial name
- Kuschelina thoracica (Fabricius, 1775)

Species of beetle

Kuschelina thoracica is a species of flea beetle in the family Chrysomelidae.
