= Cryptorhynchus elegans =

Scientific classification
- Domain: Eukaryota
- Kingdom: Animalia
- Phylum: Arthropoda
- Class: Insecta
- Order: Coleoptera
- Suborder: Polyphaga
- Infraorder: Cucujiformia
- Family: Curculionidae
- Genus: Cryptorhynchus
- Species: C. elegans

Binomial name
- Cryptorhynchus elegans Say, 1831

Species of beetle

Cryptorhynchus elegans is a species of weevils in the subfamily Cryptorhynchinae. It is found in North America.
