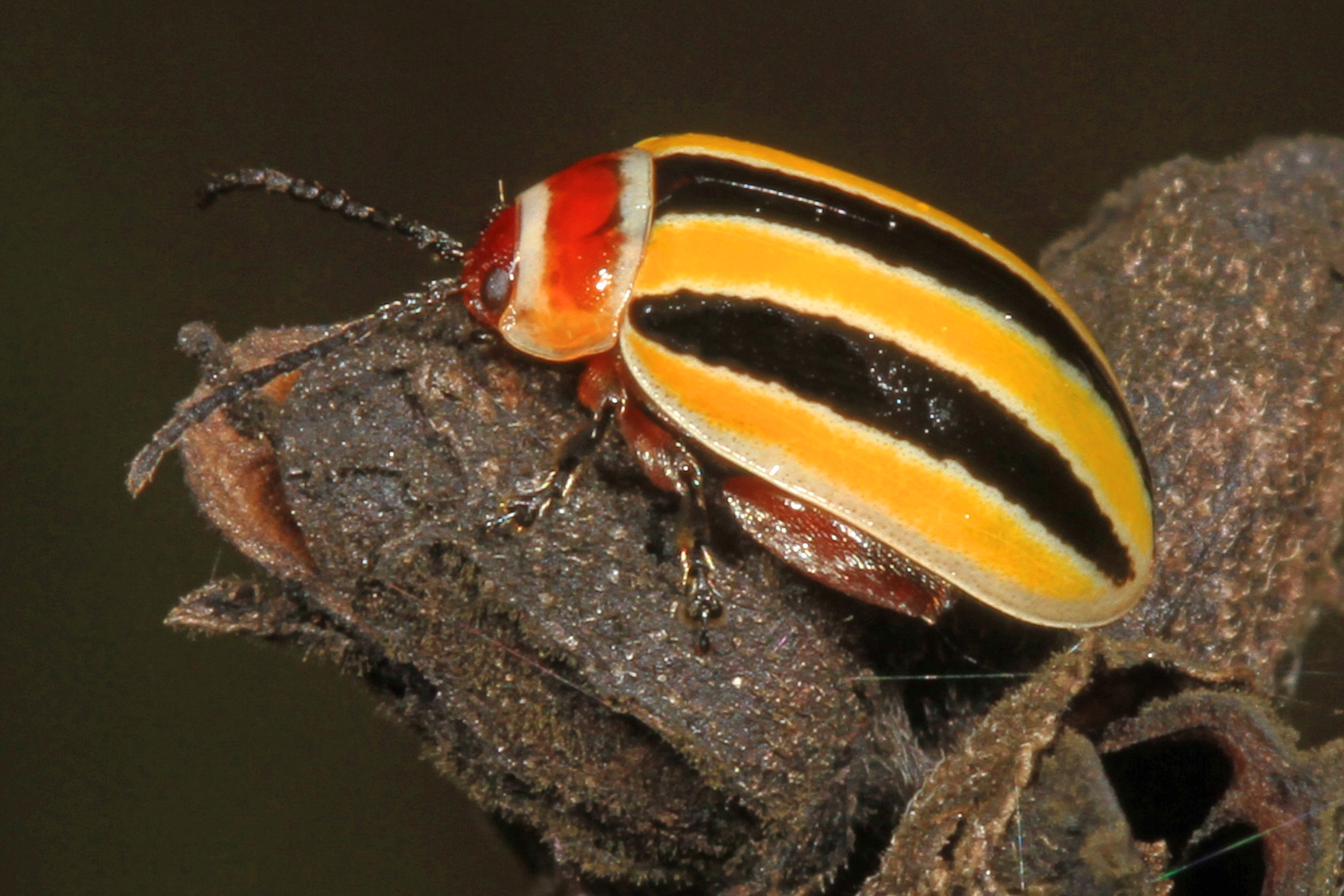

Scientific classification
- Kingdom: Animalia
- Phylum: Arthropoda
- Class: Insecta
- Order: Coleoptera
- Suborder: Polyphaga
- Infraorder: Cucujiformia
- Family: Chrysomelidae
- Tribe: Alticini
- Genus: Kuschelina
- Species: K. floridana

Binomial name
- Kuschelina floridana (Blake, 1954)

= Kuschelina floridana =

Species of beetle

Kuschelina floridana is a species of flea beetle in the family Chrysomelidae. It is found in North America.

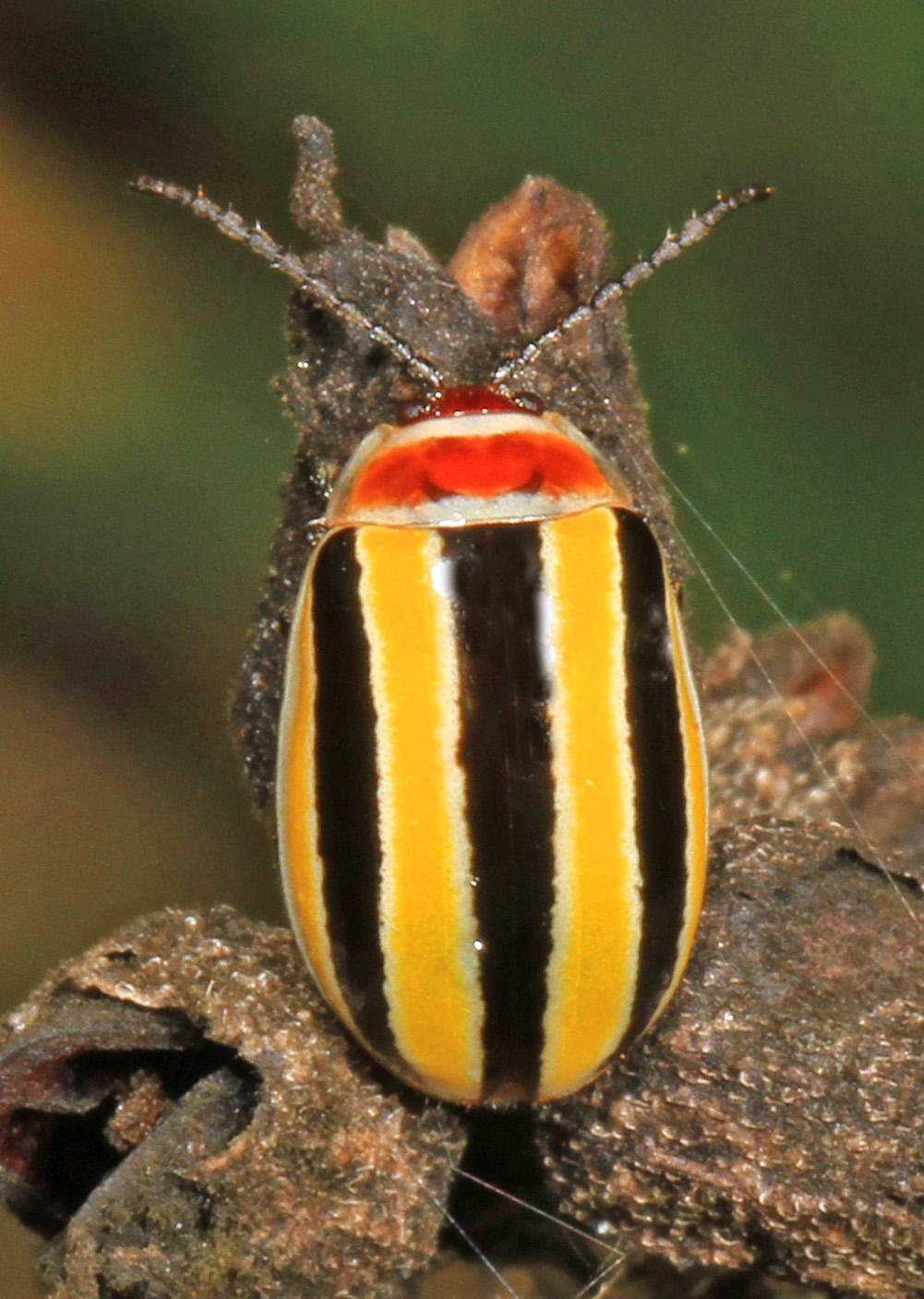
