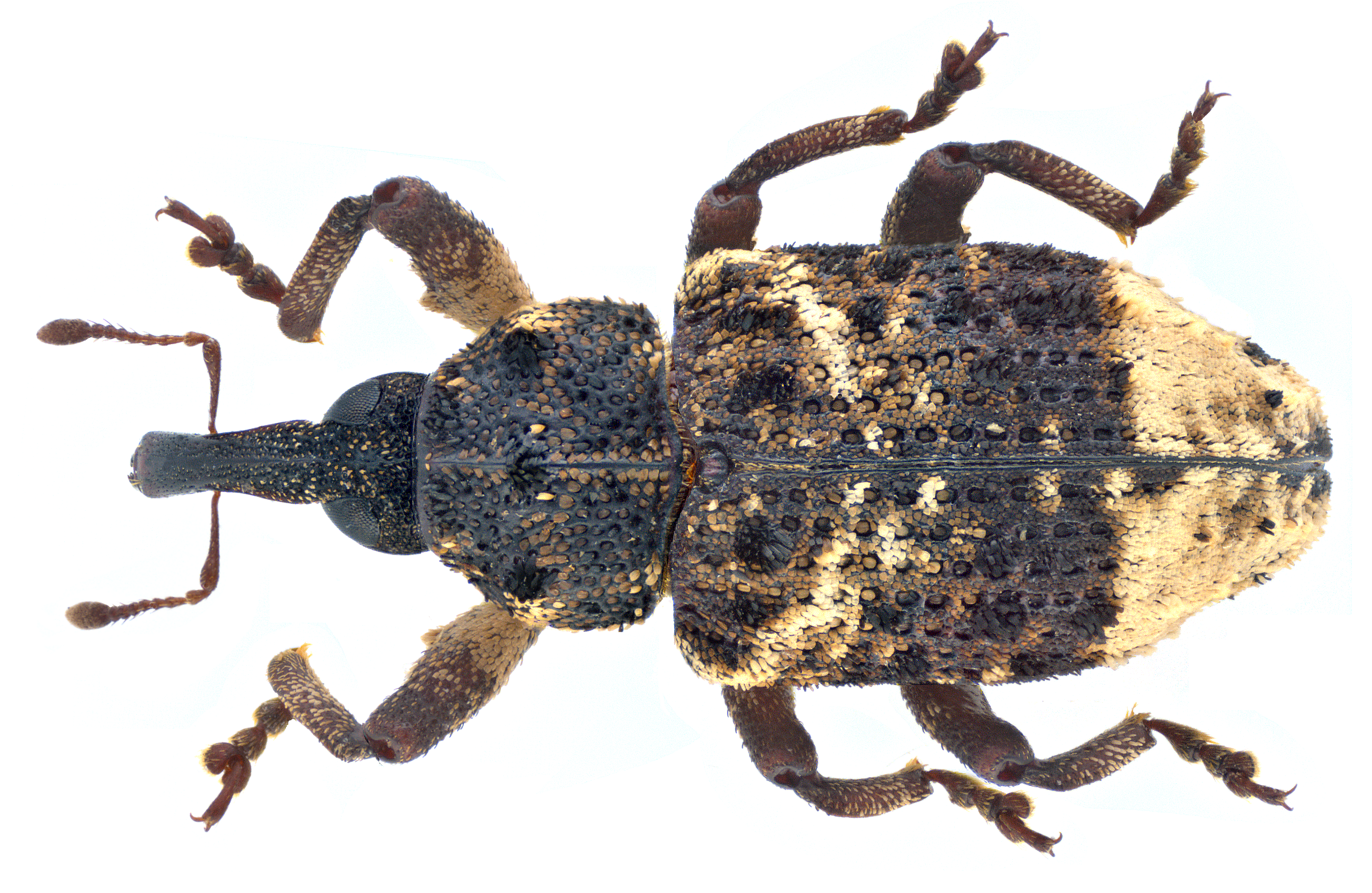
- Cryptorhynchus lapathi 7,4 mm (5,0-8,5 mm)

Scientific classification
- Kingdom: Animalia
- Phylum: Arthropoda
- Class: Insecta
- Order: Coleoptera
- Suborder: Polyphaga
- Infraorder: Cucujiformia
- Family: Curculionidae
- Genus: Cryptorhynchus
- Species: C. lapathi

Binomial name
- Cryptorhynchus lapathi (Linnaeus, 1758)

= Cryptorhynchus lapathi =

Species of beetle

Cryptorhynchus lapathi is a species of weevil native to Europe. Its common names include poplar and willow borer, osier weevil, and willow weevil.

This weevil has long been known as a pest insect of willows cultivated for basketry.
