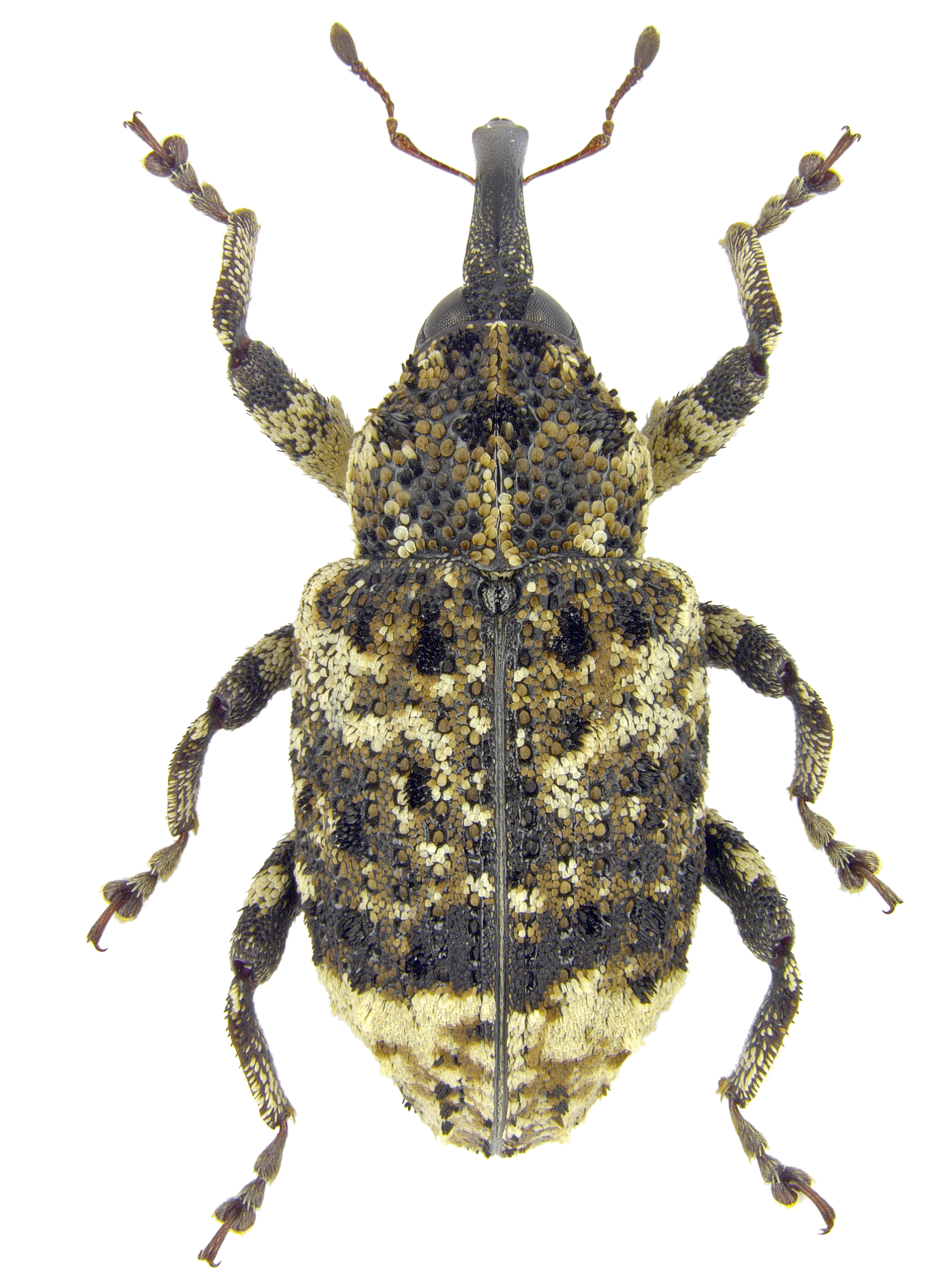
- Cryptorhynchus lapathi

Scientific classification
- Kingdom: Animalia
- Phylum: Arthropoda
- Class: Insecta
- Order: Coleoptera
- Suborder: Polyphaga
- Infraorder: Cucujiformia
- Family: Curculionidae
- Subfamily: Cryptorhynchinae
- Tribe: Cryptorhynchini
- Subtribe: Cryptorhynchina
- Genus: Cryptorhynchus; Illiger, 1807

Diversity
- at least 480 species

= Cryptorhynchus =

Genus of beetles

Cryptorhynchus, from Ancient Greek κρυπτός (kruptós), meaning "hidden", and ῥύγχος (rhúnkos), meaning "snout", is a genus of hidden snout weevils in the beetle family Curculionidae. There are at least 480 described species in Cryptorhynchus.

== Gallery ==
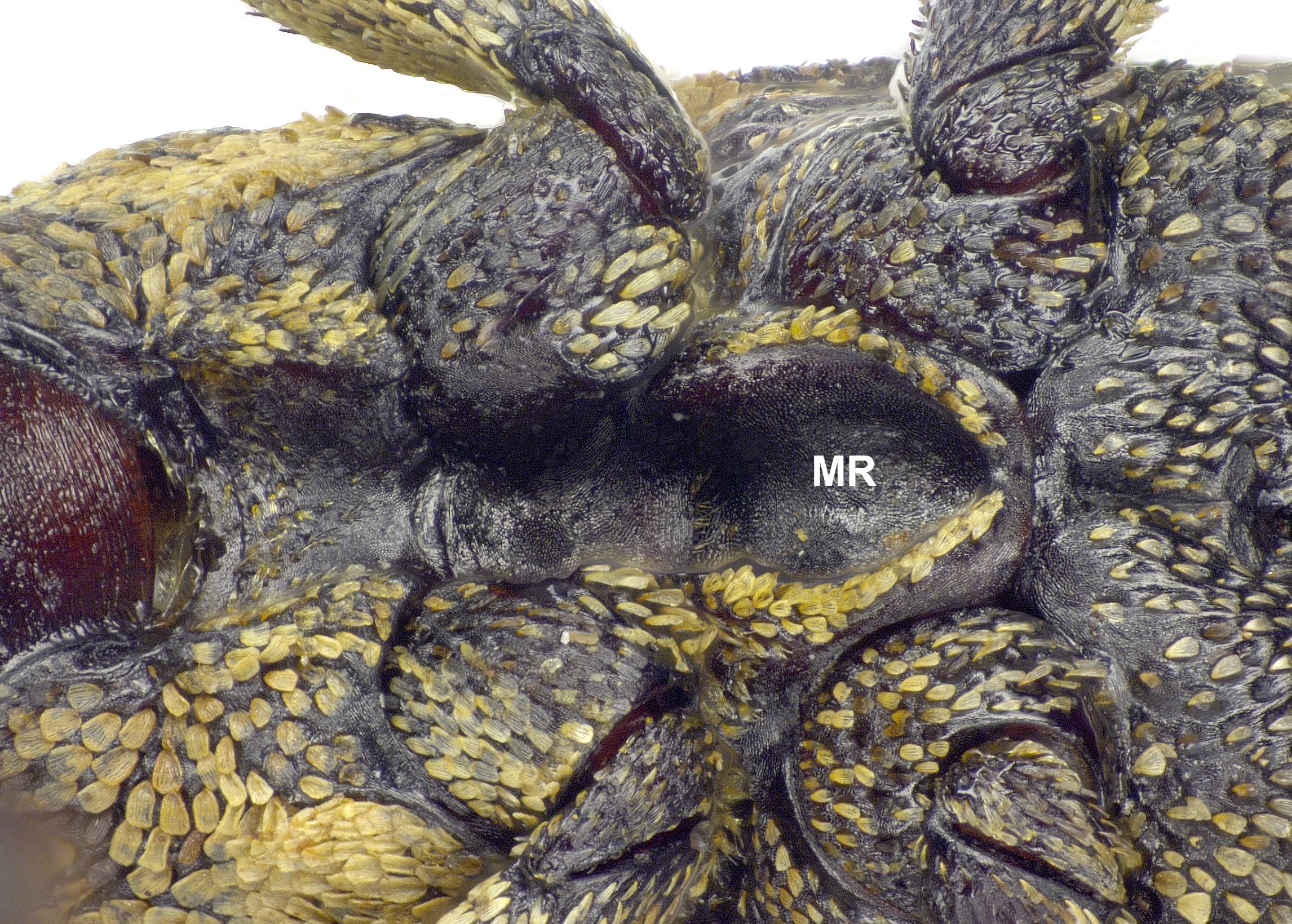
Cryptorhynchus lapathi; rostral furrow with mesoventral receptacle (MR), the diagnostic character of the Cryptorhynchinae sensu stricto

== See also ==
- List of Cryptorhynchus species
