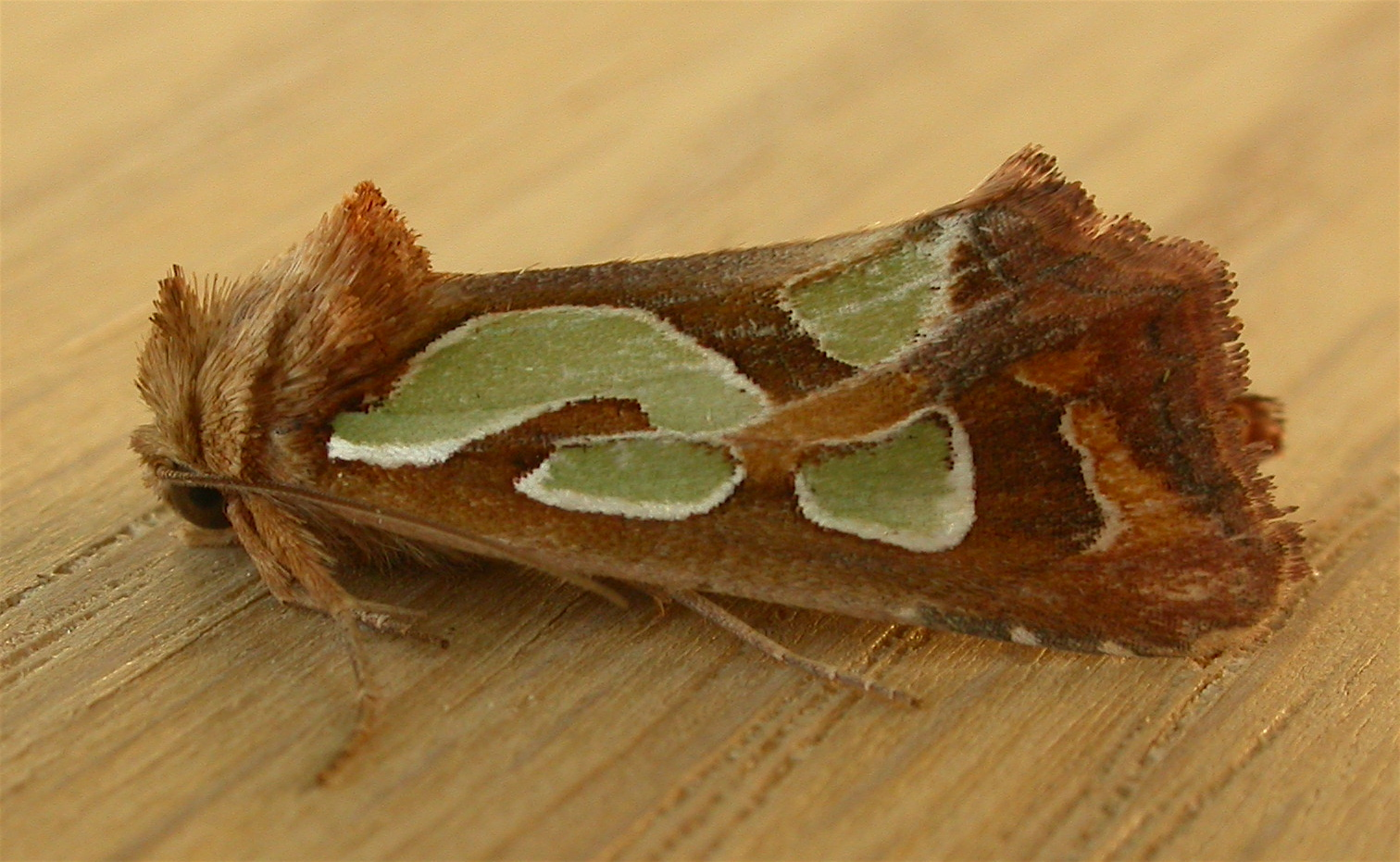
- Cosmodes elegans

Scientific classification
- Kingdom: Animalia
- Phylum: Arthropoda
- Class: Insecta
- Order: Lepidoptera
- Superfamily: Noctuoidea
- Family: Noctuidae
- Subfamily: Acronictinae
- Genus: Cosmodes; Guenée in Boisduval & Guenée, 1852

= Cosmodes =

Genus of moths

Cosmodes is a genus of moths of the family Noctuidae. It has a single species Cosmodes elegans, found mainly in Australia and New Zealand.

== Species ==
- Cosmodes elegans (Donovan, 1805)
