= Penthea lichenosa =

Scientific classification
- Domain: Eukaryota
- Kingdom: Animalia
- Phylum: Arthropoda
- Class: Insecta
- Order: Coleoptera
- Suborder: Polyphaga
- Infraorder: Cucujiformia
- Family: Cerambycidae
- Tribe: Pteropliini
- Genus: Penthea
- Species: P. lichenosa

Binomial name
- Penthea lichenosa McKeown, 1942

Synonyms
- Penthea lichenosus McKeown, 1942

Species of beetle

Penthea lichenosa is a species of beetle in the family Cerambycidae. It was described by McKeown in 1942. It is known from Australia.
