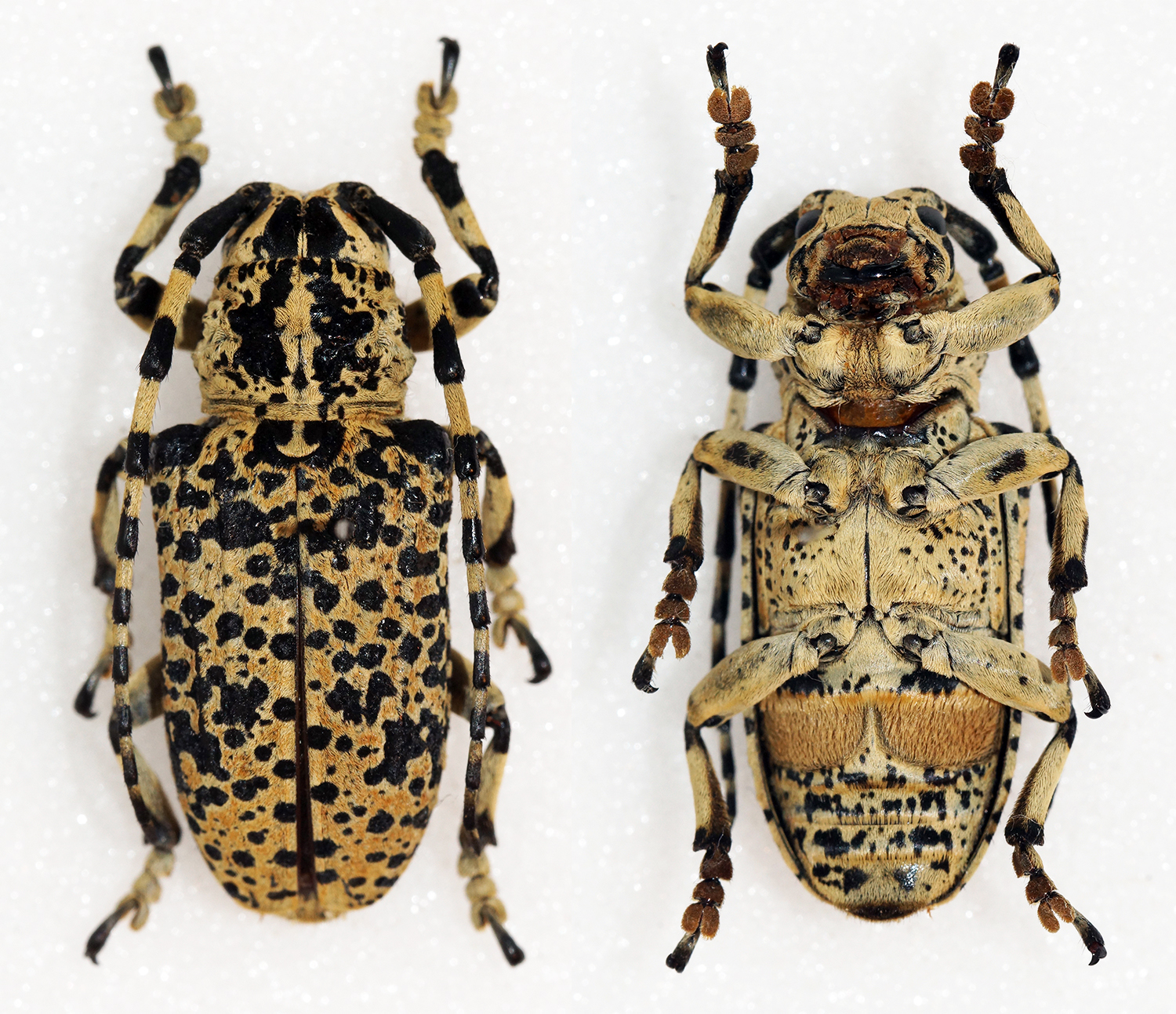

Scientific classification
- Domain: Eukaryota
- Kingdom: Animalia
- Phylum: Arthropoda
- Class: Insecta
- Order: Coleoptera
- Suborder: Polyphaga
- Infraorder: Cucujiformia
- Family: Cerambycidae
- Tribe: Pteropliini
- Genus: Penthea
- Species: P. pardalis

Binomial name
- Penthea pardalis (Newman, 1842)

Synonyms
- Lamia pardalis Newman, 1842

= Penthea pardalis =

Species of beetle

Penthea pardalis is a species of beetle in the family Cerambycidae. It was described by Newman in 1842. It is known from Australia. It contains the varietas Penthea pardalis var. occidentalis.
