= Penthea saga =

Scientific classification
- Domain: Eukaryota
- Kingdom: Animalia
- Phylum: Arthropoda
- Class: Insecta
- Order: Coleoptera
- Suborder: Polyphaga
- Infraorder: Cucujiformia
- Family: Cerambycidae
- Tribe: Pteropliini
- Genus: Penthea
- Species: P. saga

Binomial name
- Penthea saga {Pascoe, 1865}

Synonyms
- Rhytiphora saga Pascoe, 1865

Species of beetle

Penthea saga is a species of beetle in the family Cerambycidae. It was described by Francis Polkinghorne Pascoe in 1865. It is known from Australia.
