= Penthea vermicularia =

Scientific classification
- Kingdom: Animalia
- Phylum: Arthropoda
- Class: Insecta
- Order: Coleoptera
- Suborder: Polyphaga
- Infraorder: Cucujiformia
- Family: Cerambycidae
- Genus: Penthea
- Species: P. vermicularia

Binomial name
- Penthea vermicularia (Donovan, 1805)

Synonyms
- Penthea vermicularis (Donovan) Boisduval, 1835; Lamia vermicularia Donovan, 1805

Species of beetle

Penthea vermicularia is a species of beetle in the family Cerambycidae. It was described by Edward Donovan in 1805. It is known from Australia. It feeds on Acacia decurrens.
