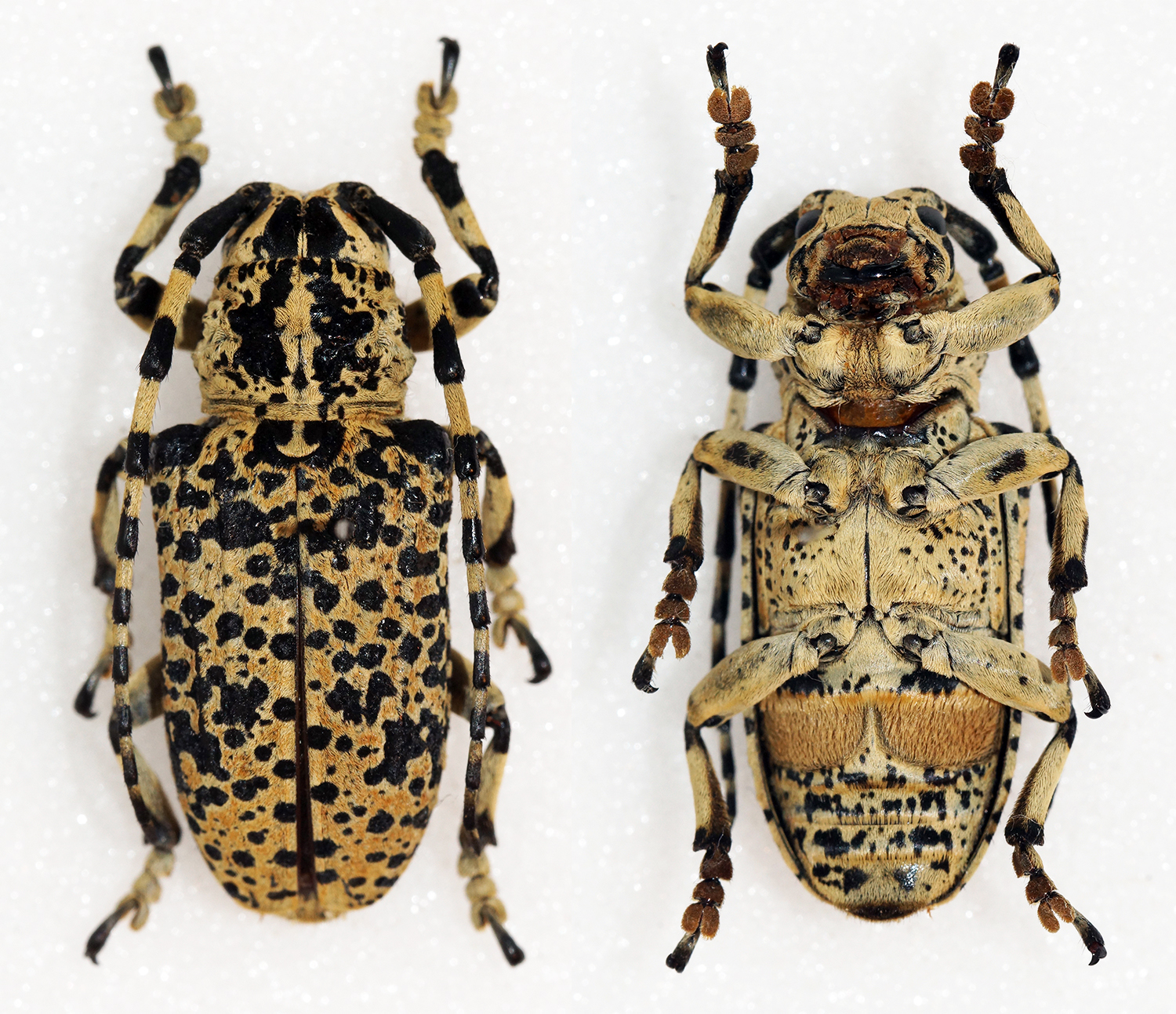
- Penthea pardalis

Scientific classification
- Domain: Eukaryota
- Kingdom: Animalia
- Phylum: Arthropoda
- Class: Insecta
- Order: Coleoptera
- Suborder: Polyphaga
- Infraorder: Cucujiformia
- Family: Cerambycidae
- Tribe: Pteropliini
- Genus: Penthea

= Penthea (beetle) =

Genus of beetles

Penthea is a genus of longhorn beetles of the subfamily Lamiinae, containing the following species:

- Penthea adamsae McKeown, 1938
- Penthea costata Pascoe, 1863
- Penthea intricata Pascoe, 1864
- Penthea lichenosa McKeown, 1942
- Penthea macularia Pascoe, 1867
- Penthea mastersi Blackburn, 1897
- Penthea melanosticta Pascoe, 1875
- Penthea militaris Pascoe, 1863
- Penthea pardalina Breuning, 1942
- Penthea pardalis (Newman, 1842)
- Penthea pullina Pascoe, 1863
- Penthea saga (Pascoe, 1865)
- Penthea scenica Pascoe, 1863
- Penthea solida Pascoe, 1863
- Penthea tigrina Blackburn, 1901
- Penthea vermicularia (Donovan, 1805)
