= Penthea mastersi =

Scientific classification
- Domain: Eukaryota
- Kingdom: Animalia
- Phylum: Arthropoda
- Class: Insecta
- Order: Coleoptera
- Suborder: Polyphaga
- Infraorder: Cucujiformia
- Family: Cerambycidae
- Tribe: Pteropliini
- Genus: Penthea
- Species: P. mastersi

Binomial name
- Penthea mastersi Blackburn, 1897

Species of beetle

Penthea mastersi is a species of beetle in the family Cerambycidae. It was described by Thomas Blackburn in 1897. It is known from Australia.
