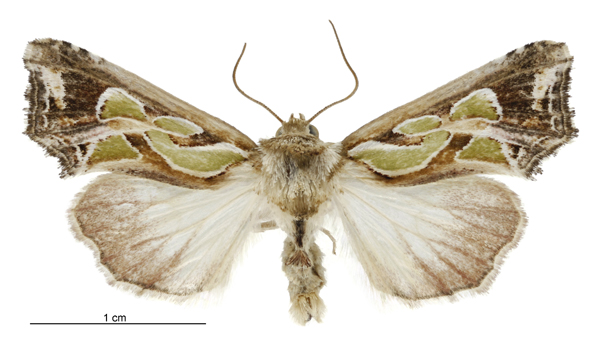
- Male
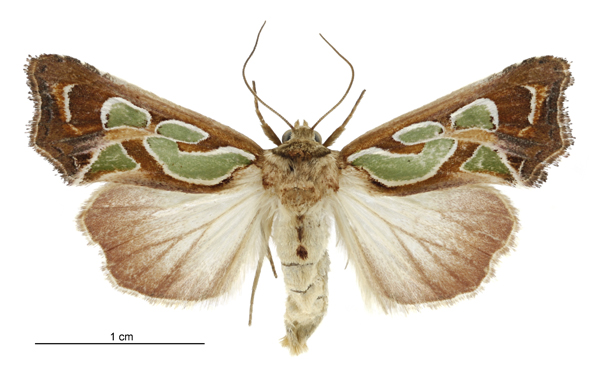
- Female

Scientific classification
- Domain: Eukaryota
- Kingdom: Animalia
- Phylum: Arthropoda
- Class: Insecta
- Order: Lepidoptera
- Superfamily: Noctuoidea
- Family: Noctuidae
- Subfamily: Acronictinae
- Genus: Cosmodes
- Species: C. elegans

Binomial name
- Cosmodes elegans (Donovan, 1805)

Synonyms
- Phalaena elegans Donovan, 1805

= Cosmodes elegans =

Species of moth

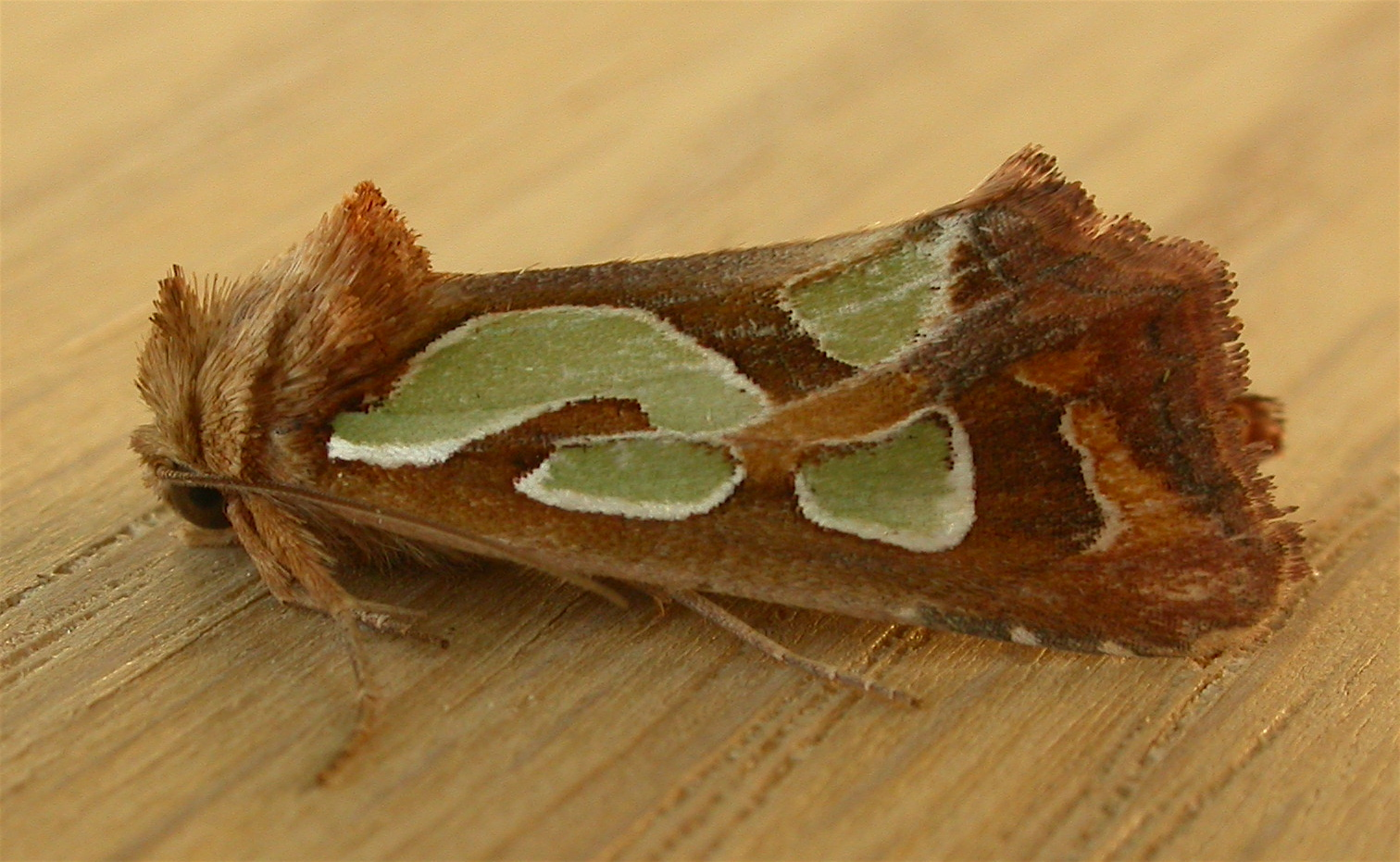
Cosmodes elegans, Australia

Cosmodes elegans, the green blotched moth, is a moth of the family Noctuidae. It is found in New South Wales, Norfolk Island, Queensland, South Australia, Victoria, Western Australia and New Zealand.

== Taxonomy ==
This species was first described by Edward Donovan in 1805 under the name Phalaena elegans. Robert Hoare was unable to locate the type specimen for his 2017 publication.

Cosmodes elegans is the only species of the genus Cosmodes.

== Description ==
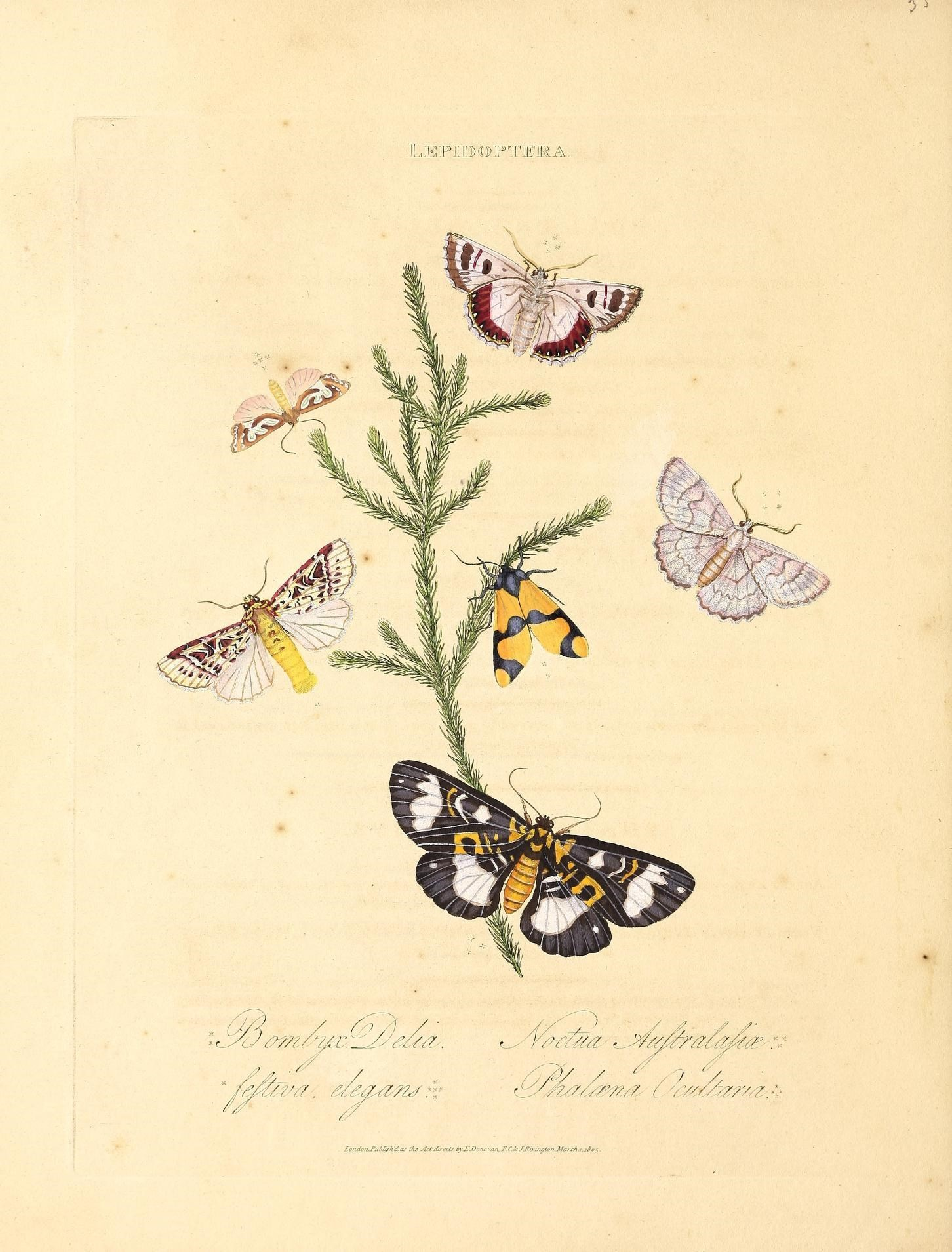
The illustration that accompanied the original description of this species.

Donovan originally described the species as follows:

First wings ferruginous, with three greenish spots edged with silver, the anterior one hooked : posterior wings reddish.

The caterpillars of this species grow to a length of about 3 cm (1.2 in) and are bright green with dark spiracles on both sides. Adult moths are brown with sinuous green markings on their forewings, white hindwings fading to light brown along the edges, and a hairy crest just behind their heads. The adult's wingspan is about 4 cm (1.6 in). The green blotched moth has a distinctively shaped forewing and this and the characteristic patterns on its forewings ensures that this species is unlikely to be confused with any other.

== Habitat ==
The green blotched moth is native to Australia, although it sometimes arrives in New Zealand as a migrant or vagrant during the summer establishing temporary colonies. The adult moth lives in forest clearings from January to May and this is where its larvae cocoons among the foliage of its preferred food source.

== Behaviour ==
This species is on the wing throughout the year but in New Zealand is more frequently recorded during the months of February to April.

== Diet ==
The larvae feed on Lobelia species, Verbena species and Wahlenbergia species.
