= Stilboma =

Scientific classification
- Domain: Eukaryota
- Kingdom: Animalia
- Phylum: Arthropoda
- Class: Insecta
- Order: Coleoptera
- Suborder: Adephaga
- Family: Carabidae
- Subtribe: Pericalina
- Genus: Stilboma; Andrewes, 1933

Genus of beetles

Stilboma is a genus of beetles in the subtribe Pericalina of the family Carabidae. They occur in the Malay Archipelago. They are similar to Pericalus but smaller, up to 5 mm (0.20 in) in length.

== Species ==
There are two species:

- Stilboma smaragdus Andrewes, 1933
- Stilboma viridis Andrewes, 1933
