= Stilboma viridis =

Scientific classification
- Domain: Eukaryota
- Kingdom: Animalia
- Phylum: Arthropoda
- Class: Insecta
- Order: Coleoptera
- Suborder: Adephaga
- Family: Carabidae
- Genus: Stilboma
- Species: S. viridis

Binomial name
- Stilboma viridis Andrewes, 1933

Species of beetles

Stilboma viridis is a species of beetle in the family Carabidae. It occurs in Indonesia, with the holotype originating from Sumatra.

Stilboma viridis is a small, winged beetle with bright green upper surfaces. It measures 4.6 mm (0.18 in) in length.
