= Stilboma smaragdus =

Scientific classification
- Kingdom: Animalia
- Phylum: Arthropoda
- Class: Insecta
- Order: Coleoptera
- Suborder: Adephaga
- Family: Carabidae
- Genus: Stilboma
- Species: S. smaragdus

Binomial name
- Stilboma smaragdus Andrewes, 1933

Species of beetles

Stilboma smaragdus is a species of beetle in the family Carabidae. It occurs in Sumatra, Java, and Borneo.

Stilboma smaragdus is a small, winged beetle. The upper surfaces are bright green, with a faint bluish tinge on head and prothorax. It measures 5 mm (0.20 in) in length.
