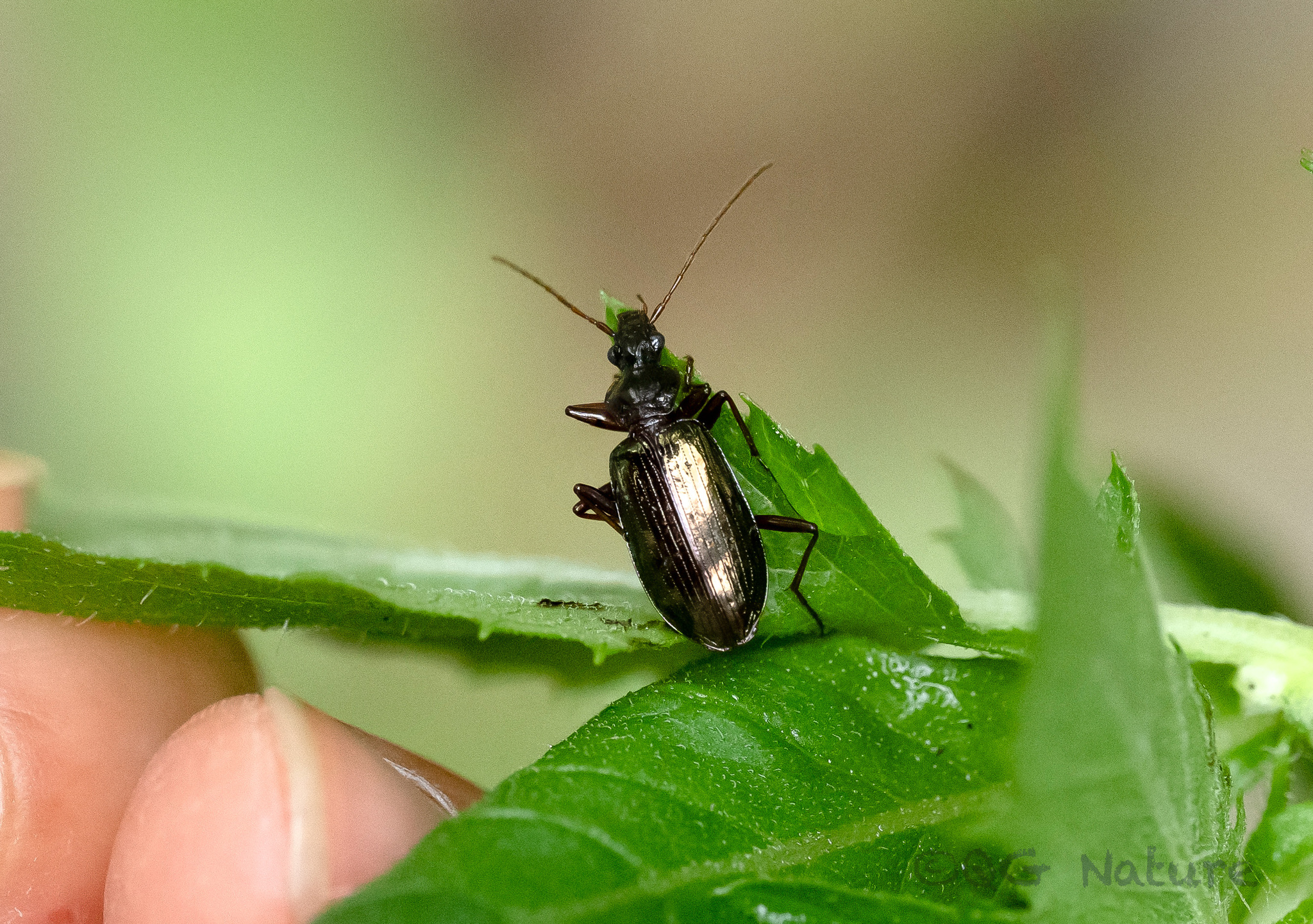
- Colpodes, China

Scientific classification
- Kingdom: Animalia
- Phylum: Arthropoda
- Class: Insecta
- Order: Coleoptera
- Suborder: Adephaga
- Family: Carabidae
- Subfamily: Platyninae
- Tribe: Platynini
- Subtribe: Platynina
- Genus: Colpodes; W.S.Macleay, 1825

= Colpodes =

Genus of beetles

Colpodes is a genus in the beetle family Carabidae. There are more than 240 described species in Colpodes, found in Asia.

== Species ==
These species are members of the genus Colpodes:

- Colpodes abropoides Chaudoir, 1879 (Philippines)
- Colpodes abruptus Andrewes, 1931 (Indonesia and Borneo)
- Colpodes acanthodes Andrewes, 1930 (Indonesia)
- Colpodes acroglyptus Bates, 1892 (Taiwan, India, Myanmar, Laos, Vietnam)
- Colpodes acuticauda Darlington, 1952 (Indonesia and New Guinea)
- Colpodes adonis Tschitscherine, 1895 (North Korea)
- Colpodes aeneipennis (Dejean, 1831) (Indonesia)
- Colpodes aeneolus Andrewes, 1931 (Indonesia and Borneo)
- Colpodes aenescens Chaudoir, 1879 (India)
- Colpodes aeruginosus Landin, 1955 (Myanmar)
- Colpodes anachoreta (Fairmaire, 1849) (Tahiti)
- Colpodes andrewesi Heller, 1926 (Philippines)
- Colpodes andrewesianus Jedlicka, 1932 (China)
- Colpodes angustus Andrewes, 1930 (Indonesia)
- Colpodes anomalus Andrewes, 1927 (Samoa)
- Colpodes antedens Darlington, 1952 (Indonesia and New Guinea)
- Colpodes antennatus Louwerens, 1953 (Myanmar)
- Colpodes apotomus Andrewes, 1931 (Indonesia and Borneo)
- Colpodes arrowi Jedlicka, 1934 (Philippines)
- Colpodes asemus Jedlicka, 1934 (Philippines)
- Colpodes asthenes Andrewes, 1931 (Indonesia and Borneo)
- Colpodes atrocyaneus Landin, 1955 (Myanmar)
- Colpodes attenuatus Louwerens, 1953 (Indonesia)
- Colpodes azurescens Landin, 1955 (Myanmar)
- Colpodes baconi Chaudoir, 1878 (India)
- Colpodes balthasari Jedlicka, 1940 (Taiwan)
- Colpodes beccarii Andrewes, 1929 (Indonesia and Borneo)
- Colpodes beckingi Louwerens, 1953 (Indonesia)
- Colpodes bennigseni Sloane, 1907 (Indonesia and New Guinea)
- Colpodes bilineatus Andrewes, 1931 (Indonesia and Borneo)
- Colpodes bipars (Walker, 1858) (Sri Lanka)
- Colpodes bipunctatus Jedlicka, 1935 (Philippines)
- Colpodes bispinus (Motschulsky, 1860) (Indonesia)
- Colpodes bloetei Louwerens, 1953 (Indonesia)
- Colpodes boninensis Kasahara, 1991 (Japan)
- Colpodes brittoni Louwerens, 1953 (Indonesia)
- Colpodes brunneus (W.S.MacLeay, 1825) (Indonesia)
- Colpodes brunnicolor Louwerens, 1955 (Indonesia)
- Colpodes caelitis Bates, 1892 (Myanmar)
- Colpodes cardioderus Fairmaire, 1889 (China)
- Colpodes castaniventris Bates, 1892 (Myanmar)
- Colpodes caudoimpressus Louwerens, 1969
- Colpodes celebensis Csiki, 1931 (Indonesia)
- Colpodes chalceus Andrewes, 1930 (Indonesia)
- Colpodes chalcochiton Andrewes, 1929 (Indonesia)
- Colpodes chinensis Jedlicka, 1934 (China)
- Colpodes chlorodes Andrewes, 1947 (China and Myanmar)
- Colpodes chloropterus Chaudoir, 1879 (Indonesia)
- Colpodes cimmerius Andrewes, 1930 (Indonesia)
- Colpodes coelestinus (Motschulsky, 1865) (Nepal, India, Myanmar)
- Colpodes concolor Louwerens, 1955 (Indonesia)
- Colpodes convexitarsis Louwerens, 1953 (Indonesia)
- Colpodes corpulentus Louwerens, 1953 (India)
- Colpodes crassus Andrewes, 1947 (Myanmar)
- Colpodes csikii Jedlicka, 1954 (Taiwan)
- Colpodes davidis Fairmaire, 1889 (China)
- Colpodes decorticatus Landin, 1955 (Myanmar)
- Colpodes deductus Landin, 1955 (Myanmar)
- Colpodes deliae Morvan, 1996 (Nepal)
- Colpodes dilatipennis Emden, 1936 (Indonesia)
- Colpodes doesburgi Louwerens, 1949 (Indonesia)
- Colpodes dohertyi Louwerens, 1953 (India)
- Colpodes drescheri Louwerens, 1953 (Indonesia)
- Colpodes dulit Louwerens, 1955 (Indonesia and Borneo)
- Colpodes edax Andrewes, 1947 (Myanmar)
- Colpodes elegans Andrewes, 1929 (Indonesia)
- Colpodes elegantellus Lorenz, 1998 (India)
- Colpodes emdeni Louwerens, 1953 (Indonesia)
- Colpodes emmerichi Jedlicka, 1932 (China)
- Colpodes enganoensis Louwerens, 1955 (Indonesia and Philippines)
- Colpodes eremita (Fairmaire, 1849) (Tahiti)
- Colpodes esetosus Morvan, 2006 (China)
- Colpodes eucnemis Bates, 1892 (Myanmar)
- Colpodes euparyphus Andrewes, 1923 (India)
- Colpodes eurous (Andrewes, 1924) (India)
- Colpodes excisus Baehr, 2012 (Indonesia and New Guinea)
- Colpodes falcus Jedlicka, 1935 (China)
- Colpodes felix Andrewes, 1930 (Indonesia and Philippines)
- Colpodes ferus Andrewes, 1947 (Myanmar)
- Colpodes flavicornis Andrewes, 1947 (Myanmar)
- Colpodes flavipes Jedlicka, 1935 (China)
- Colpodes fletcheri Andrewes, 1923 (Sri Lanka)
- Colpodes florensis Louwerens, 1953 (Indonesia)
- Colpodes formosanus Jedlicka, 1939 (Taiwan)
- Colpodes foveatus Andrewes, 1947 (Myanmar)
- Colpodes frontalis Morvan, 2006 (China)
- Colpodes fruhstorferi Louwerens, 1955 (Indonesia)
- Colpodes fukiensis Jedlicka, 1956 (China)
- Colpodes fulgidus Andrewes, 1947 (Myanmar)
- Colpodes fulvipes Jedlicka, 1934 (Philippines)
- Colpodes fulvus Jedlicka, 1934 (Philippines)
- Colpodes furculosus Landin, 1955 (Myanmar)
- Colpodes fuscus Andrewes, 1931 (Indonesia and Borneo)
- Colpodes ganssuensis Semenov, 1889 (China)
- Colpodes giganteus Fairmaire, 1891 (China)
- Colpodes gracilipennis Emden, 1936 (Indonesia)
- Colpodes guega Darlington, 1971 (Indonesia and New Guinea)
- Colpodes halurgus Andrewes, 1937 (Indonesia)
- Colpodes handschini Louwerens, 1953 (Indonesia)
- Colpodes hauseri Jedlicka, 1931 (China)
- Colpodes heyrovskyi Jedlicka, 1940 (Taiwan)
- Colpodes hirmocoelus Chaudoir, 1879 (Nepal and India)
- Colpodes humilis Andrewes, 1931 (Indonesia and Borneo)
- Colpodes imitator Andrewes, 1930 (China)
- Colpodes impressiceps Louwerens, 1953 (India)
- Colpodes impunctatus Andrewes, 1923 (India)
- Colpodes incertus Chaudoir, 1879 (India)
- Colpodes indiae Louwerens, 1953 (India)
- Colpodes infirmus Andrewes, 1947 (Myanmar)
- Colpodes infuscatus Jedlicka, 1940 (Taiwan)
- Colpodes intenuatus Landin, 1955 (Myanmar)
- Colpodes isomorphus Louwerens, 1953 (India)
- Colpodes iteratus Bates, 1886 (Sri Lanka)
- Colpodes javanus Louwerens, 1953 (Indonesia)
- Colpodes kanak Fauvel, 1903 (New Caledonia)
- Colpodes klickai Jedlicka, 1934 (China)
- Colpodes klossi Andrewes, 1931 (Indonesia and Borneo)
- Colpodes klynstrai Andrewes, 1929 (Indonesia)
- Colpodes knapperti Andrewes, 1930 (Indonesia)
- Colpodes komala Andrewes, 1932 (India)
- Colpodes komarovi (Lafer, 1976) (North Korea)
- Colpodes latus Louwerens, 1949 (Indonesia)
- Colpodes lautulus Andrewes, 1931 (Indomalaya)
- Colpodes leuroides Jedlicka, 1965 (Nepal)
- Colpodes leurus Andrewes, 1947 (Myanmar)
- Colpodes levator Andrewes, 1947 (Myanmar)
- Colpodes lieftincki Louwerens, 1953 (Indonesia)
- Colpodes lokayi Jedlicka, 1940 (Taiwan)
- Colpodes lonchites Andrewes, 1937 (Indonesia)
- Colpodes longicornis Landin, 1955 (Myanmar)
- Colpodes longitarsalis Morvan, 2006 (China)
- Colpodes longulus Louwerens, 1953 (Myanmar)
- Colpodes lutescens Jedlicka, 1940 (Taiwan)
- Colpodes luzonicus Chaudoir, 1879 (Philippines)
- Colpodes macerellus Lorenz, 1998 (Taiwan)
- Colpodes maculatus Jedlicka, 1934 (Philippines)
- Colpodes maculicollis Chaudoir, 1879 (Indonesia)
- Colpodes malaisei Louwerens, 1953 (Indonesia)
- Colpodes mandibularis Landin, 1955 (Myanmar)
- Colpodes mantillerianus Morvan, 2006 (China)
- Colpodes marani Jedlicka, 1935 (China)
- Colpodes matsumurai (Habu, 1973) (Nepal)
- Colpodes membrosus Andrewes, 1947 (Myanmar)
- Colpodes metabolus Andrewes, 1937 (Indonesia and Philippines)
- Colpodes microps Andrewes, 1931 (Indonesia and Borneo)
- Colpodes mirabilis Jedlicka, 1935 (Philippines)
- Colpodes mirificus Jedlicka, 1940 (Taiwan)
- Colpodes miwai Jedlicka, 1940 (Taiwan)
- Colpodes mixtus Jedlicka, 1940 (Taiwan)
- Colpodes mobilis Andrewes, 1947 (Myanmar)
- Colpodes modestus Andrewes, 1947 (Myanmar)
- Colpodes modiglianii Andrewes, 1929 (Indonesia)
- Colpodes muelleri Louwerens, 1953 (Indonesia)
- Colpodes muleyitus Bates, 1892 (Myanmar)
- Colpodes nathani Jedlicka, 1969 (India)
- Colpodes neolevator Landin, 1955 (Myanmar)
- Colpodes nepalensis Morvan, 1996 (Nepal)
- Colpodes nigratus Fairmaire, 1881 (Fiji)
- Colpodes nigriceps (Motschulsky, 1865) (India)
- Colpodes nyctobius Andrewes, 1947 (Myanmar)
- Colpodes obesus Andrewes, 1947 (Myanmar)
- Colpodes occipitalis Morvan, 2006 (China)
- Colpodes ocylus Jedlicka, 1934 (China)
- Colpodes olearis Andrewes, 1931 (Indonesia and Borneo)
- Colpodes orientalis Louwerens, 1953 (Indonesia)
- Colpodes orinomus Andrewes, 1929 (Indonesia)
- Colpodes overbecki Emden, 1936 (Indonesia)
- Colpodes paradisiacus (Kirschenhofer, 1990) (China)
- Colpodes pecirkai Jedlicka, 1934 (Indonesia and Borneo)
- Colpodes pelius Jedlicka, 1934 (Philippines)
- Colpodes peridus Jedlicka, 1934 (Philippines)
- Colpodes perigonoides Louwerens, 1953 (Indonesia)
- Colpodes phaeoderus Chaudoir, 1879 (Indonesia)
- Colpodes phengodes Andrewes, 1947 (Myanmar)
- Colpodes phoenix Andrewes, 1930 (Indonesia)
- Colpodes pilosus Morvan, 2006 (China)
- Colpodes placidus Heller, 1900 (Indonesia)
- Colpodes plagioderus Chaudoir, 1879 (India)
- Colpodes planops Louwerens, 1953 (Nepal)
- Colpodes plicatus Louwerens, 1953 (Indonesia)
- Colpodes pohnerti Jedlicka, 1934 (China)
- Colpodes porphyrodes Andrewes, 1931 (Indonesia and Borneo)
- Colpodes pronotosetosus Morvan, 2006 (China)
- Colpodes punctatus Jedlicka, 1934 (Taiwan)
- Colpodes punctulicollis Bates, 1892 (Myanmar)
- Colpodes purkynei Jedlicka, 1934 (China)
- Colpodes purpurascens Andrewes, 1929 (Indonesia and Borneo)
- Colpodes quadratus Landin, 1955 (Myanmar)
- Colpodes rectangulus Morvan, 2006 (China)
- Colpodes repletus Bates, 1886 (Sri Lanka)
- Colpodes retusus Bates, 1886 (Sri Lanka)
- Colpodes rex Darlington, 1952 (Indonesia and New Guinea)
- Colpodes roepkei Louwerens, 1953 (Indonesia)
- Colpodes rougeriei Morvan, 2006 (China)
- Colpodes rubescens Andrewes, 1931 (Indonesia and Borneo)
- Colpodes rufitarsis (Chaudoir, 1850) (Indomalaya)
- Colpodes rufithorax Jedlicka, 1934 (Philippines)
- Colpodes rupex Andrewes, 1947 (Myanmar)
- Colpodes sadonis Landin, 1955 (Myanmar)
- Colpodes salsus Jedlicka, 1934 (Philippines)
- Colpodes salvazae Louwerens, 1955 (Myanmar and Laos)
- Colpodes sandalodes Andrewes, 1931 (Indonesia and Borneo)
- Colpodes saphyripennis Chaudoir, 1878 (China, India, Indonesia)
- Colpodes sarcodes Andrewes, 1947 (Myanmar)
- Colpodes scoriaceus Landin, 1955 (Myanmar)
- Colpodes sebosus Andrewes, 1926 (Sri Lanka)
- Colpodes semistriatus Chaudoir, 1879 (Pakistan and India)
- Colpodes semiviridis Louwerens, 1953 (India)
- Colpodes septemlineatus Jedlicka, 1934 (China)
- Colpodes setiporus (Reitter, 1893) (Tadzhikistan)
- Colpodes shebbearei Andrewes, 1930 (India)
- Colpodes simplicicauda Darlington, 1952 (Indonesia and New Guinea)
- Colpodes sinuicauda Darlington, 1952 (Indonesia and New Guinea)
- Colpodes sjostedti Andrewes, 1930 (Indonesia)
- Colpodes smaragdinipennis Chaudoir, 1859 (Indonesia)
- Colpodes spectans Jedlicka, 1934 (Taiwan and Philippines)
- Colpodes spinulifer Bates, 1892 (India and Myanmar)
- Colpodes stepaneki Jedlicka, 1940 (Taiwan)
- Colpodes sterbai Jedlicka, 1940 (Taiwan)
- Colpodes straneoi Jedlicka, 1963 (India)
- Colpodes subviridis Andrewes, 1947 (Myanmar)
- Colpodes sumatrensis Louwerens, 1953 (Indonesia)
- Colpodes sutteri Louwerens, 1953 (Indonesia)
- Colpodes tantus Jedlicka, 1934 (Philippines)
- Colpodes tarsalis Landin, 1955 (Myanmar)
- Colpodes teledoides Jedlicka, 1935 (Philippines)
- Colpodes teledus Jedlicka, 1934 (Philippines)
- Colpodes tenggerensis Louwerens, 1953 (Indonesia)
- Colpodes tetricus Andrewes, 1947 (Myanmar)
- Colpodes tibang Louwerens, 1964 (Indonesia and Borneo)
- Colpodes tjambae Louwerens, 1955 (Indonesia)
- Colpodes toxopei Andrewes, 1930 (Indonesia)
- Colpodes trapezoides Jedlicka, 1934 (Philippines)
- Colpodes undulipennis Bates, 1892 (Myanmar and Singapore)
- Colpodes vietnami Jedlicka, 1968 (Vietnam)
- Colpodes violis Jedlicka, 1934 (China)
- Colpodes viridis Jedlicka, 1940 (Taiwan)
- Colpodes wangi Morvan & Tian, 2001 (China)
- Colpodes wardi Louwerens, 1953 (Myanmar)
- Colpodes wassulandi (Jedlicka, 1962) (China)
- Colpodes wegeneri Emden, 1936 (Indonesia)
- Colpodes wolfi (Heyden, 1915) (New Guinea and Papua)
- Colpodes xanthocnemus Fairmaire, 1881 (Fiji)
- Colpodes xenos Bates, 1886 (Sri Lanka)
- Colpodes yamaguchii Kasahara, 1991 (Japan)
