= Colpodes elegans =

Scientific classification
- Domain: Eukaryota
- Kingdom: Animalia
- Phylum: Arthropoda
- Class: Insecta
- Order: Coleoptera
- Suborder: Adephaga
- Family: Carabidae
- Genus: Colpodes
- Species: C. elegans

Binomial name
- Colpodes elegans Andrewes, 1929

Synonyms
- Colpodes (Colpodes) elegans

Species of beetle

Colpodes elegans is a species of ground beetles (insects in the family Carabidae).
