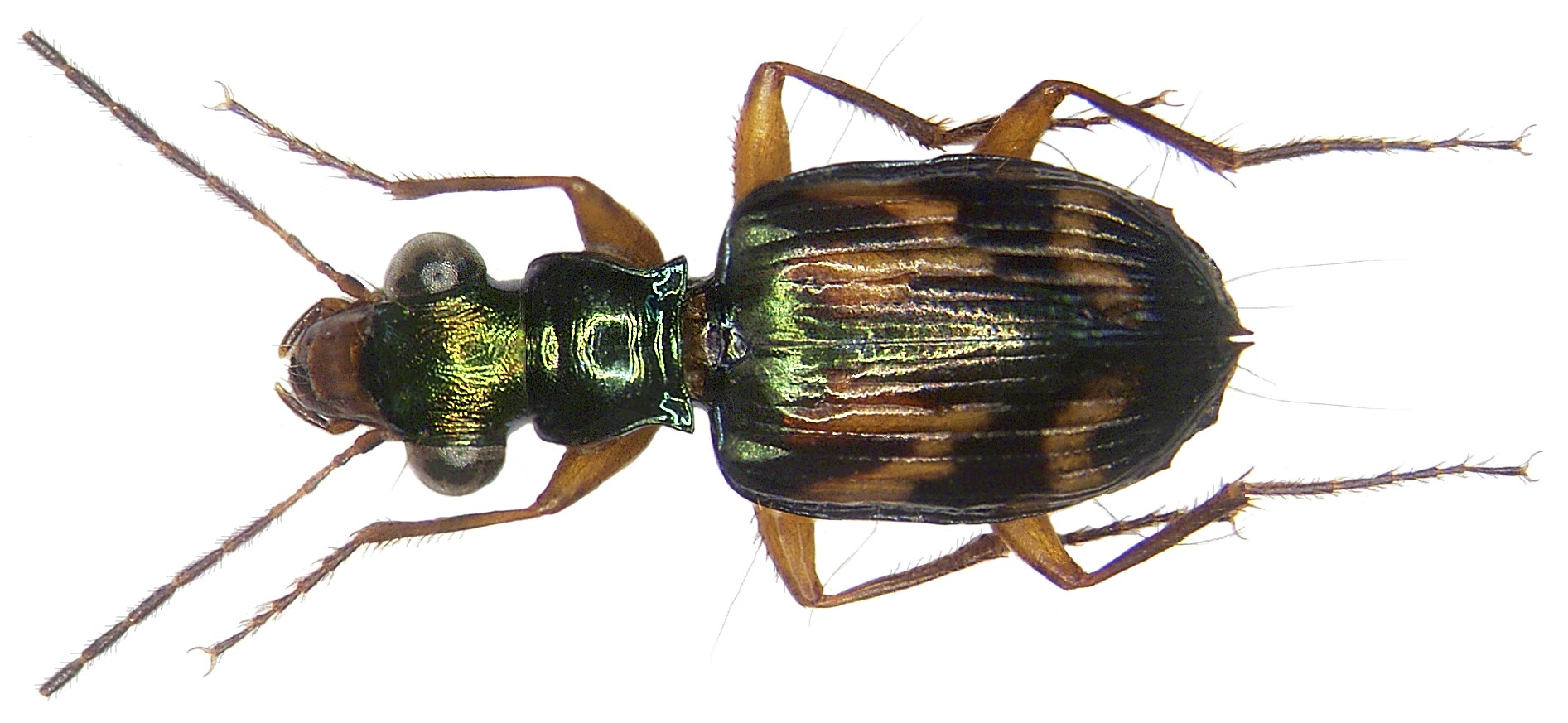
- Pericalus figuratus

Scientific classification
- Domain: Eukaryota
- Kingdom: Animalia
- Phylum: Arthropoda
- Class: Insecta
- Order: Coleoptera
- Suborder: Adephaga
- Family: Carabidae
- Subfamily: Lebiinae
- Tribe: Lebiini
- Subtribe: Pericalina
- Genus: Pericalus; W.S.MacLeay, 1825

Subgenera
- Coeloprosopus Chaudoir, 1842; Pericalus W.S.MacLeay, 1825

= Pericalus =

Genus of beetles

Pericalus is a genus in the beetle family Carabidae. There are at least 40 described species in Pericalus, found in the south, southeast, and east of Asia.

== Species ==
These 40 species belong to the genus Pericalus:

- Pericalus acutidens Shi & Liang, 2018 (China, Myanmar, Vietnam)
- Pericalus aeneipennis Louwerens, 1964 (Indonesia and Borneo)
- Pericalus amplus Andrewes, 1937 (China, India, Myanmar, Vietnam)
- Pericalus angusticollis Baehr, 1994 (Indonesia and Borneo)
- Pericalus atricornis Baehr, 1994 (Indonesia)
- Pericalus baehri Fedorenko, 2017 (Indonesia and Borneo)
- Pericalus cicindeloides (W.S.MacLeay, 1825) (Southeast Asia)
- Pericalus cordicollis Andrewes, 1931 (Indonesia and Borneo)
- Pericalus cuprascens Baehr, 1994 (Indonesia and New Guinea)
- Pericalus depressus Andrewes, 1926 (Southeast Asia)
- Pericalus distinctus Dupuis, 1913 (India and Myanmar)
- Pericalus dux Andrewes, 1920 (China and Laos)
- Pericalus elegans Shi & Liang, 2018 (China)
- Pericalus fascinator Andrewes, 1937 (India)
- Pericalus figuratus Chaudoir, 1861 (Indonesia and New Guinea)
- Pericalus formosanus Dupuis, 1913 (Taiwan)
- Pericalus funestus Andrewes, 1926 (Indonesia)
- Pericalus gibbosus Shi & Liang, 2018 (China and Myanmar)
- Pericalus gratus Schaum in Chaudoir, 1861 (Indonesia)
- Pericalus guttatus Chevrolat, 1833 (Indomalaya)
- Pericalus klapperichi Jedlicka, 1953
- Pericalus laetus Schaum, 1860 (Indonesia and Borneo)
- Pericalus levifrons Heller, 1916 (Philippines)
- Pericalus longicollis Chaudoir, 1870 (Southeast Asia)
- Pericalus magnus Baehr, 1994 (Indonesia)
- Pericalus mariaarquezae Anichtchenko & Cabras, 2018 (Philippines)
- Pericalus nigripes Baehr, 2000 (Indonesia and Borneo)
- Pericalus novaeirlandiae Baehr, 2003 (New Guinea and Papua)
- Pericalus obscuratus Shi & Liang, 2018 (China)
- Pericalus obtusipennis Fedorenko, 2017 (China, Laos, Vietnam)
- Pericalus ornatus Schmidt-Goebel, 1846 (China, Taiwan, Indomalaya)
- Pericalus philippinus Heller, 1916 (Philippines)
- Pericalus picturatus Chaudoir, 1870 (Indonesia)
- Pericalus quadrimaculatus (W.S.MacLeay, 1825) (Southeast Asia)
- Pericalus robustus Baehr, 1994 (Indonesia)
- Pericalus signatus Jedlicka, 1936 (Philippines)
- Pericalus tetrastigma Chaudoir, 1861 (Malaysia, Singapore, Indonesia, Borneo)
- Pericalus undatus Chaudoir, 1848 (Philippines)
- Pericalus violaceus Andrewes, 1926 (Malaysia and Indonesia)
- Pericalus xanthopus Schaum, 1860 (Malaysia, Indonesia, Borneo)
