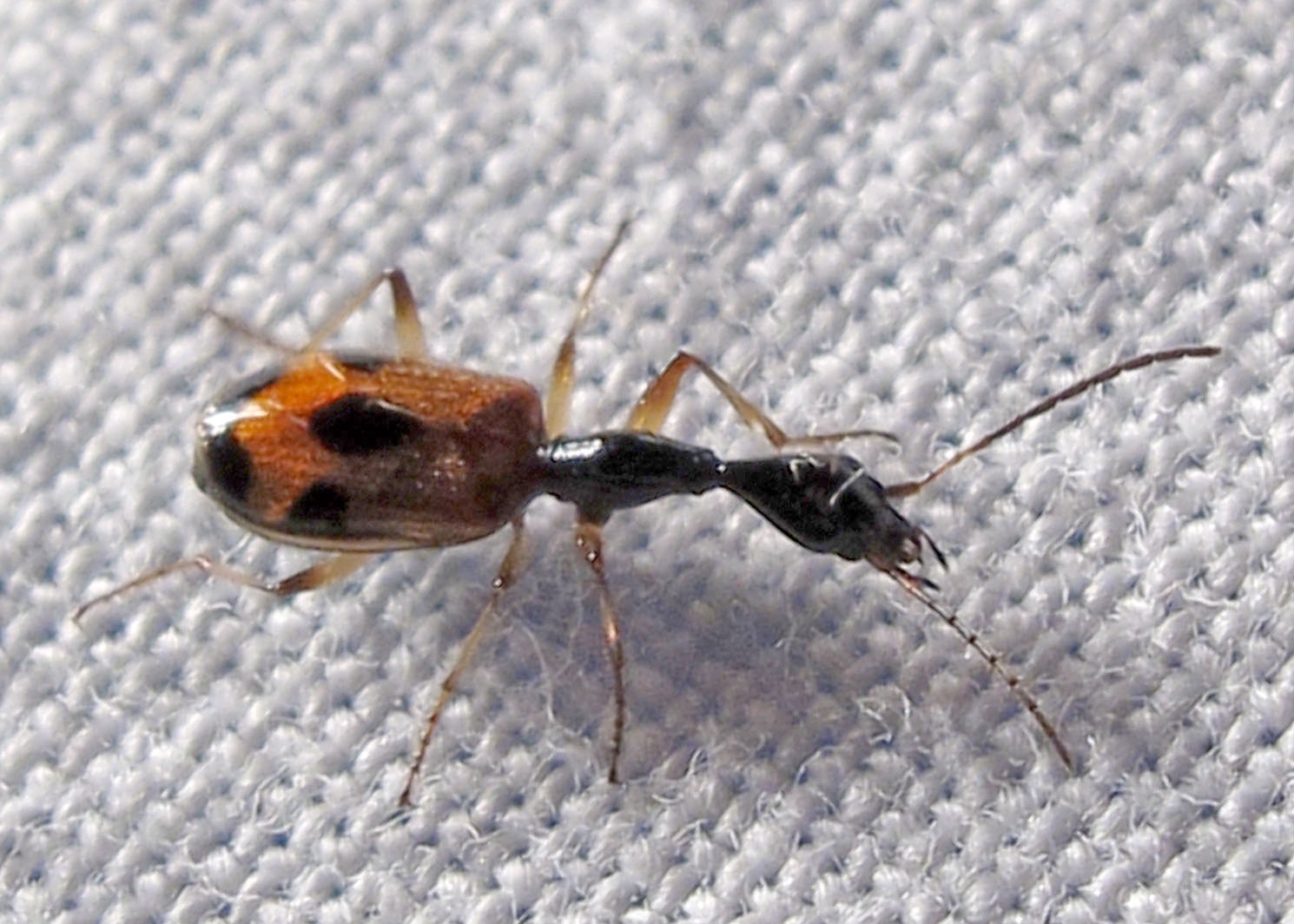

Scientific classification
- Kingdom: Animalia
- Phylum: Arthropoda
- Class: Insecta
- Order: Coleoptera
- Suborder: Adephaga
- Family: Carabidae
- Genus: Colliuris
- Species: C. pensylvanica

Binomial name
- Colliuris pensylvanica (Linnaeus, 1758)

Synonyms
- Colliuris picta (Chaudoir, 1843)

= Colliuris pensylvanica =

Species of beetle

Colliuris pensylvanica, also known as the long-necked ground beetle, is a species of ground beetle in the family Carabidae. They range in size between 5.8-7.2mm long and mainly live in open places.

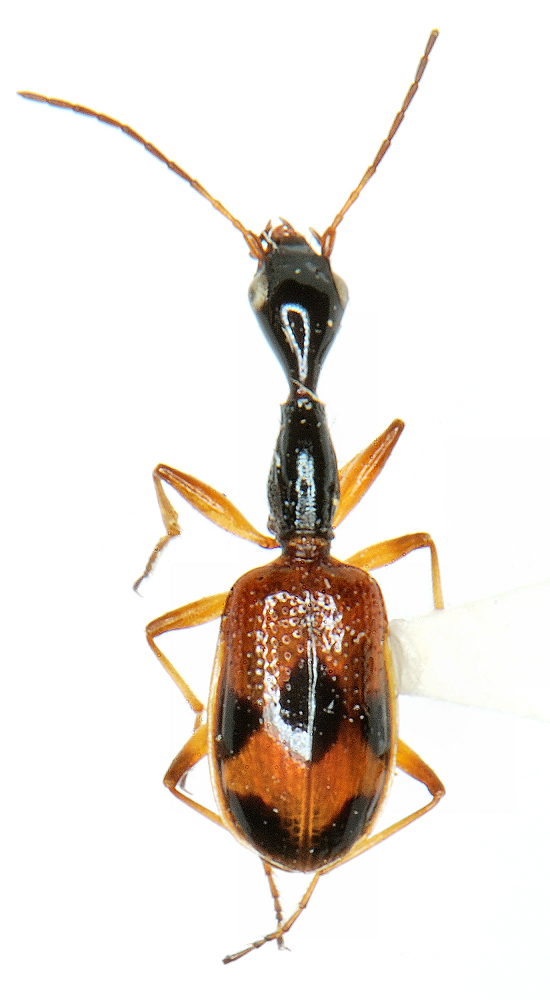
Long-necked ground beetle, Colliuris pensylvanica
