= Colliuris elegans =

Scientific classification
- Domain: Eukaryota
- Kingdom: Animalia
- Phylum: Arthropoda
- Class: Insecta
- Order: Coleoptera
- Suborder: Adephaga
- Family: Carabidae
- Genus: Colliuris
- Species: C. elegans

Binomial name
- Colliuris elegans (Guerin-Meneville, 1855)

Synonyms
- Colliuris (Plagiorhytis) elegans

Species of beetle

Colliuris elegans is a species of ground beetle in the genus Colliuris found in Brazil.

Note that Colliuris elegans Vanderl., 1829, is a synonym for Collyris elegans, a species found in Java.
