= Colliuris caymanensis =

Scientific classification
- Domain: Eukaryota
- Kingdom: Animalia
- Phylum: Arthropoda
- Class: Insecta
- Order: Coleoptera
- Suborder: Adephaga
- Family: Carabidae
- Genus: Colliuris
- Species: C. caymanensis

Binomial name
- Colliuris caymanensis Darlington, 1947

Species of beetle

Colliuris caymanensis is a species of ground beetle in the family Carabidae.
