= Colliuris lengi =

Scientific classification
- Domain: Eukaryota
- Kingdom: Animalia
- Phylum: Arthropoda
- Class: Insecta
- Order: Coleoptera
- Suborder: Adephaga
- Family: Carabidae
- Genus: Colliuris
- Species: C. lengi

Binomial name
- Colliuris lengi (Schaeffer, 1910)

Species of beetle

Colliuris lengi is a species of ground beetle in the family Carabidae.
