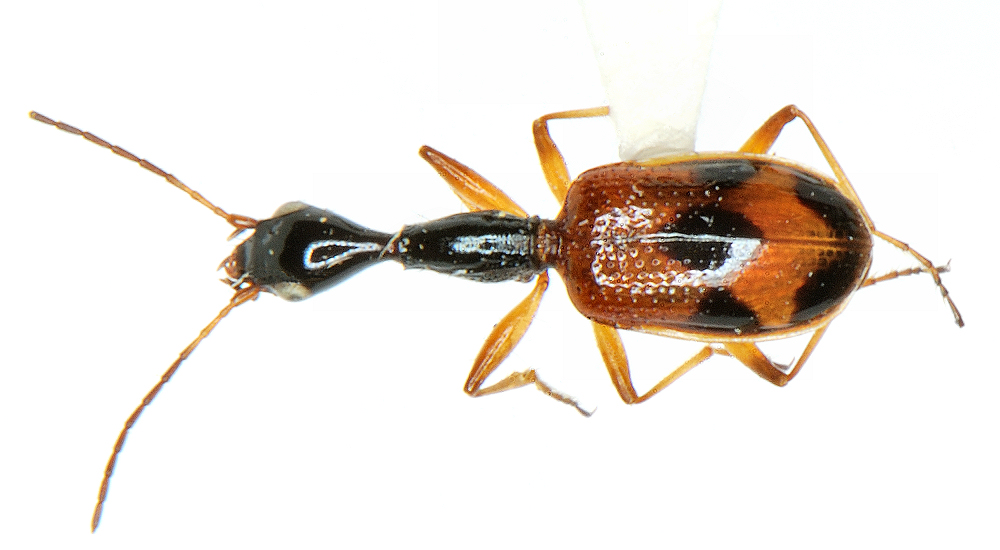
- Colliuris pensylvanica

Scientific classification
- Domain: Eukaryota
- Kingdom: Animalia
- Phylum: Arthropoda
- Class: Insecta
- Order: Coleoptera
- Suborder: Adephaga
- Family: Carabidae
- Subfamily: Lebiinae
- Tribe: Odacanthini
- Genus: Colliuris; DeGeer, 1774

Subgenera
- Anapiodera Liebke, 1938; Anaplagiorrhytis Liebke, 1930; Apiodera Chaudoir, 1848; Apioderella Liebke, 1938; Apioderina Liebke, 1938; Calocolliuris Liebke, 1938; Casnoniella Liebke, 1938; Colliurella Liebke, 1930; Colliurina Liebke, 1930; Colliuris DeGeer, 1774; Cosnania Dejean, 1821; Isocasnonia Liebke, 1938; Mimocasnonia Liebke, 1938; Odacanthina Liebke, 1938; Odacanthomimus Liebke, 1938; Paracolliuris Liebke, 1930; Plagiorhytis Chaudoir, 1848; Pseudocasnonia Liebke, 1930; Pseudoplagiorrhytis Liebke, 1930

Synonyms
- Cosnania Dejean, 1821

= Colliuris =

Genus of beetles

Colliuris is a genus of ground beetles in the family Carabidae. There are more than 90 described species in Colliuris.

== Species ==
These 99 species belong to the genus Colliuris:

- Colliuris academica Liebke, 1933
- Colliuris aenea Laporte, 1835
- Colliuris affinis (Chaudoir, 1863)
- Colliuris amoena (Chaudoir, 1863)
- Colliuris arrowi Liebke, 1930
- Colliuris batesii (Chaudoir, 1863)
- Colliuris bierigi Liebke, 1932
- Colliuris bivittis (Chaudoir, 1872)
- Colliuris brevipennis (Chaudoir, 1863)
- Colliuris bruchi Liebke, 1936
- Colliuris bucephala Liebke, 1930
- Colliuris canoae Liebke, 1933
- Colliuris caymanensis Darlington, 1947
- Colliuris championi (Bates, 1883)
- Colliuris corrusca (Chaudoir, 1863)
- Colliuris cosciniodera (Chaudoir, 1852)
- Colliuris crispa Klug, 1834
- Colliuris crispella Liebke, 1930
- Colliuris cuyabana Liebke, 1930
- Colliuris cyanea Liebke, 1930
- Colliuris cyanella Liebke, 1930
- Colliuris cyanescens (Chaudoir, 1863)
- Colliuris demerarae Liebke, 1930
- Colliuris elegans (Guérin-Méneville, 1855)
- Colliuris ellipticeps Liebke, 1930
- Colliuris elongata (Fabricius, 1801)
- Colliuris emdeni Liebke, 1930
- Colliuris excellens Liebke, 1930
- Colliuris flavicornis Brullé, 1834
- Colliuris flavipes (Chaudoir, 1850)
- Colliuris funckii (Putzeys, 1845)
- Colliuris fusca (Reiche, 1842)
- Colliuris geniculata (Gory, 1833)
- Colliuris gestroi Liebke, 1930
- Colliuris gibba (Chaudoir, 1863)
- Colliuris gratiosa Liebke, 1930
- Colliuris gundlachi Darlington, 1934
- Colliuris horni Liebke, 1930
- Colliuris hubenthali Liebke, 1930
- Colliuris humboldti Liebke, 1930
- Colliuris immaculipennis Liebke, 1930
- Colliuris inaequalis (Dejean & Boisduval, 1829)
- Colliuris irregularis (Bates, 1883)
- Colliuris kuntzeni Liebke, 1930
- Colliuris laeviceps Liebke, 1930
- Colliuris lagoenicollis Liebke, 1930
- Colliuris lengi (Schaeffer, 1910)
- Colliuris leprieurii Laporte, 1835
- Colliuris lineolata (Bates, 1884)
- Colliuris liodiscus (Chaudoir, 1872)
- Colliuris lioptera (Bates, 1891)
- Colliuris longipennis (Chaudoir, 1863)
- Colliuris ludoviciana (Sallé, 1849)
- Colliuris lugubris Liebke, 1930
- Colliuris maculipennis Liebke, 1930
- Colliuris marginestriata (Putzeys, 1845)
- Colliuris marmorata (Chaudoir, 1863)
- Colliuris multifoveata Liebke, 1930
- Colliuris noah Darlington, 1934
- Colliuris oglobini Liebke, 1938
- Colliuris olivacea (Chaudoir, 1863)
- Colliuris pensylvanica (Linnaeus, 1758)
- Colliuris peruana (Erichson, 1847)
- Colliuris pilatei (Chaudoir, 1848)
- Colliuris plicaticollis (Reiche, 1842)
- Colliuris portoricensis Liebke, 1930
- Colliuris puberula Liebke, 1930
- Colliuris pubescens (Chaudoir, 1863)
- Colliuris punctatostriata (Chaudoir, 1872)
- Colliuris puncticollis (Chaudoir, 1863)
- Colliuris quadrimaculata (Gory, 1833)
- Colliuris quadrisignata Laporte, 1832
- Colliuris quadrispinosa (Chaudoir, 1863)
- Colliuris robusta Liebke, 1930
- Colliuris rudis (Chaudoir, 1872)
- Colliuris rufipes (Dejean, 1825)
- Colliuris rugicollis (Dejean, 1825)
- Colliuris santarema (Chaudoir, 1872)
- Colliuris signata (Chaudoir, 1872)
- Colliuris sipolisi Oberthür, 1884
- Colliuris spinigera (Chaudoir, 1863)
- Colliuris strandi Liebke, 1938
- Colliuris strasseni (Liebke, 1927)
- Colliuris subdistincta (Chaudoir, 1863)
- Colliuris subtilis (R.F.Sahlberg, 1847)
- Colliuris sulcicauda (Bates, 1883)
- Colliuris sulcicollis (Bates, 1891)
- Colliuris surinamensis (Linnaeus, 1758)
- Colliuris tetrastigma (Chaudoir, 1863)
- Colliuris trimaculata Liebke, 1930
- Colliuris tripustulata (Chaudoir, 1863)
- Colliuris tristigma (Bates, 1883)
- Colliuris tubulifera (Bates, 1878)
- Colliuris umbrigera (Chaudoir, 1872)
- Colliuris variabilis Liebke, 1930
- Colliuris varicornis Perty, 1830
- Colliuris variolosa (Chaudoir, 1863)
- Colliuris vianai Liebke, 1938
- Colliuris viridicollis (Chaudoir, 1863)
