= Colliuris lioptera =

Scientific classification
- Domain: Eukaryota
- Kingdom: Animalia
- Phylum: Arthropoda
- Class: Insecta
- Order: Coleoptera
- Suborder: Adephaga
- Family: Carabidae
- Genus: Colliuris
- Species: C. lioptera

Binomial name
- Colliuris lioptera (Bates, 1891)

Species of beetle

Colliuris lioptera is a species of ground beetle in the family Carabidae.
