= Colliuris ludoviciana =

Scientific classification
- Domain: Eukaryota
- Kingdom: Animalia
- Phylum: Arthropoda
- Class: Insecta
- Order: Coleoptera
- Suborder: Adephaga
- Family: Carabidae
- Genus: Colliuris
- Species: C. ludoviciana

Binomial name
- Colliuris ludoviciana (Sallé, 1849)

Species of beetle

Colliuris ludoviciana is a species of ground beetle in the family Carabidae. It is found in North America.
