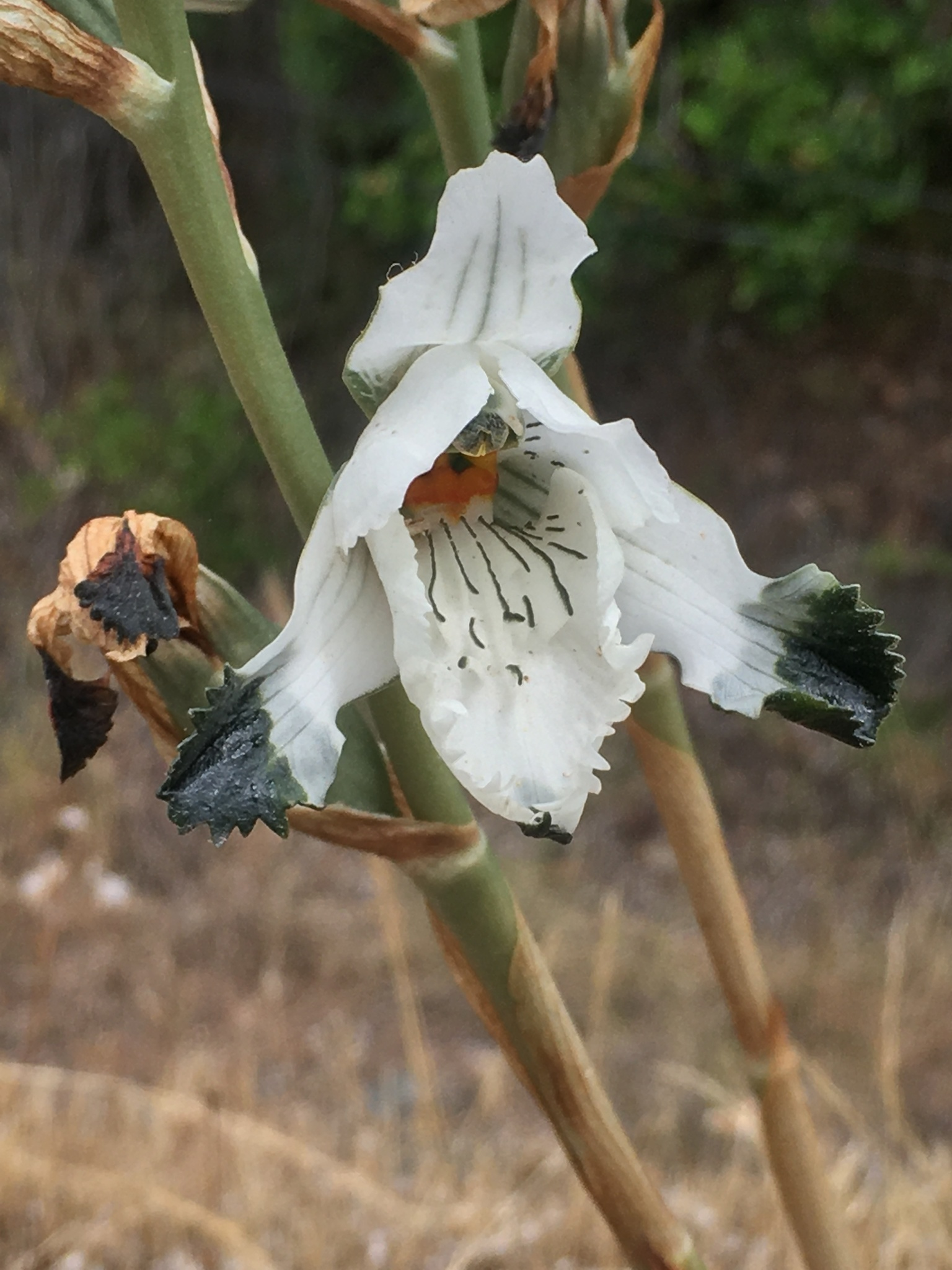

Scientific classification
- Kingdom: Plantae
- Clade: Tracheophytes
- Clade: Angiosperms
- Clade: Monocots
- Order: Asparagales
- Family: Orchidaceae
- Subfamily: Orchidoideae
- Tribe: Cranichideae
- Genus: Chloraea
- Species: C. bletioides

Binomial name
- Chloraea bletioides Lindl.

= Chloraea bletioides =

Species of plant

Chloraea bletioides is a species of orchid. It is endemic to Chile where it is distributed between the Valparaíso and Ñuble regions.
