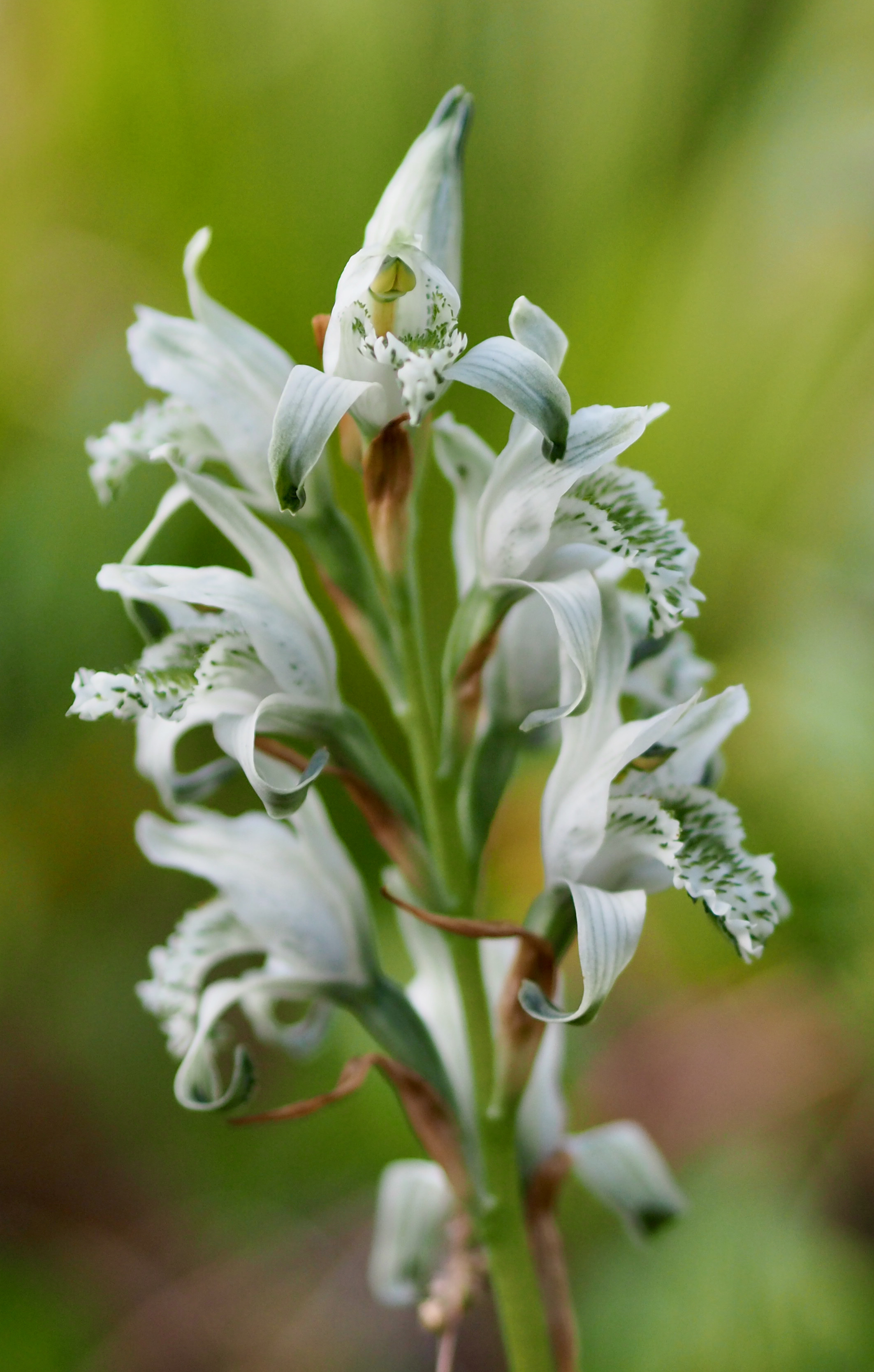

Scientific classification
- Kingdom: Plantae
- Clade: Tracheophytes
- Clade: Angiosperms
- Clade: Monocots
- Order: Asparagales
- Family: Orchidaceae
- Subfamily: Orchidoideae
- Tribe: Cranichideae
- Genus: Chloraea
- Species: C. volkmannii

Binomial name
- Chloraea volkmannii Phil. ex Kraenzl.

= Chloraea volkmannii =

Species of orchid

Chloraea volkmannii is a species of orchid. This species is endemic to Chile where it is found in the Bio Bio and Araucanía regions.
