= Chloraea elegans =

Scientific classification
- Kingdom: Plantae
- Clade: Tracheophytes
- Clade: Angiosperms
- Clade: Monocots
- Order: Asparagales
- Family: Orchidaceae
- Subfamily: Orchidoideae
- Tribe: Cranichideae
- Genus: Chloraea
- Species: C. elegans

Binomial name
- Chloraea elegans M.N.Correa

Species of flowering plant

Chloraea elegans is an orchid species endemic to the Salta region of Argentina.
