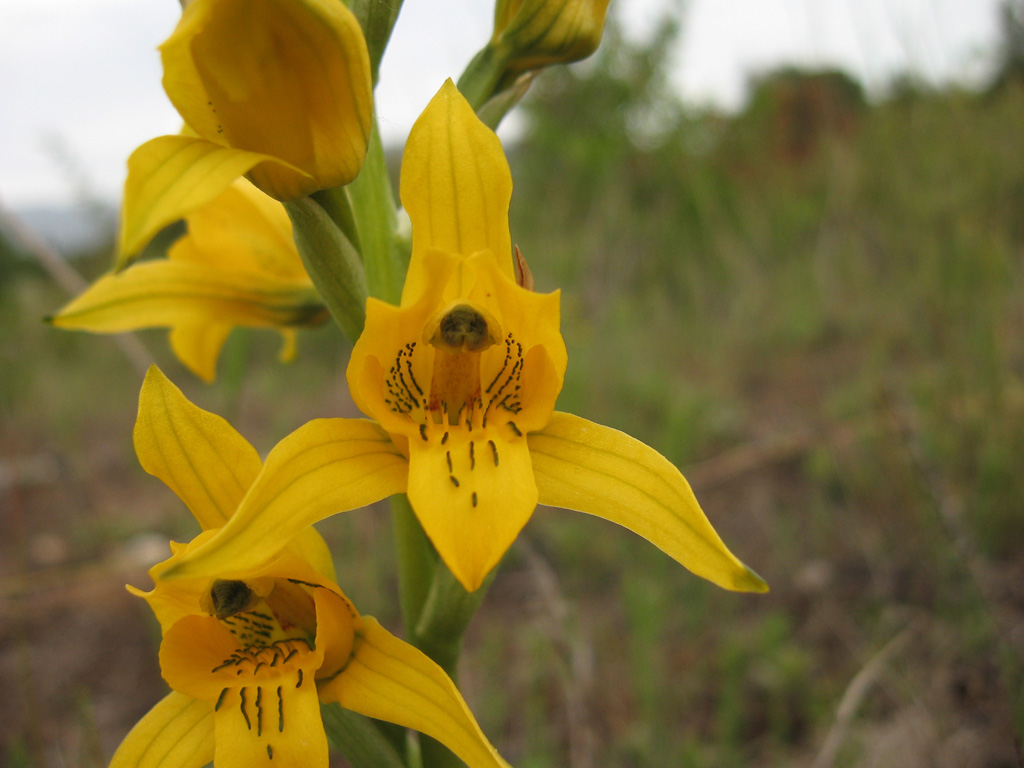
- Chloraea gavilu

Scientific classification
- Kingdom: Plantae
- Clade: Tracheophytes
- Clade: Angiosperms
- Clade: Monocots
- Order: Asparagales
- Family: Orchidaceae
- Subfamily: Orchidoideae
- Tribe: Cranichideae
- Subtribe: Chloraeinae
- Genus: Chloraea; Lindl.

Type species
- Chloraea virescens (Willd.) Lindl.

Synonyms
- Asarca Poepp. ex Lindl.; Ulantha Hook.; Bieneria Rchb.f.; Chileorchis Szlach.; Correorchis Szlach.

= Chloraea =

Genus of flowering plants

Chloraea is a genus of flowering plants from the orchid family, Orchidaceae. It contains 52 recognized species, native to South America and to the Falkland Islands.

== Species ==
1. Chloraea alpina
2. Chloraea apinnula
3. Chloraea barbata
4. Chloraea bella
5. Chloraea bidentata
6. Chloraea biserialis
7. Chloraea bletioides
8. Chloraea boliviana
9. Chloraea calantha
10. Chloraea castillonii
11. Chloraea chica
12. Chloraea chrysantha
13. Chloraea cogniauxii
14. Chloraea crispa
15. Chloraea cristata
16. Chloraea cuneata
17. Chloraea curicana
18. Chloraea cylindrostachya
19. Chloraea deflexa
20. Chloraea densipapillosa
21. Chloraea disoides
22. Chloraea elegans
23. Chloraea fiebrigiana
24. Chloraea fonkii
25. Chloraea galeata
26. Chloraea gavilu
27. Chloraea grandiflora
28. Chloraea heteroglossa
29. Chloraea lamellata
30. Chloraea laxiflora
31. Chloraea lechleri
32. Chloraea longipetala
33. Chloraea magellanica
34. Chloraea major
35. Chloraea membranacea
36. Chloraea multiflora
37. Chloraea multilineolata
38. Chloraea nudilabia
39. Chloraea philippii
40. Chloraea phoenicea
41. Chloraea piquichen
42. Chloraea praecincta
43. Chloraea prodigiosa
44. Chloraea reticulata
45. Chloraea septentrionalis
46. Chloraea speciosa
47. Chloraea subpandurata
48. Chloraea tectata
49. Chloraea undulata
50. Chloraea venosa
51. Chloraea viridiflora
52. Chloraea volkmannii

== See also ==
- List of Orchidaceae genera
