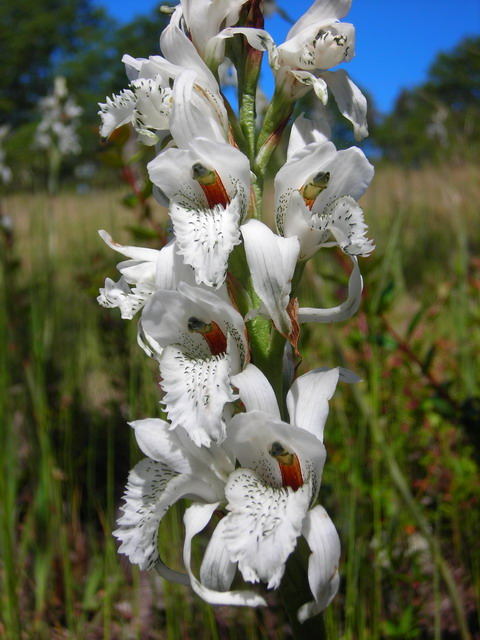

Scientific classification
- Kingdom: Plantae
- Clade: Tracheophytes
- Clade: Angiosperms
- Clade: Monocots
- Order: Asparagales
- Family: Orchidaceae
- Subfamily: Orchidoideae
- Tribe: Cranichideae
- Genus: Chloraea
- Species: C. piquichen

Binomial name
- Chloraea piquichen Lindl. 1827

= Chloraea piquichen =

Species of orchid

Chloraea piquichen is a species of orchid in the genus Chloraea. It is a tuberous geophyte native to central and southern Chile and southern Argentina.
