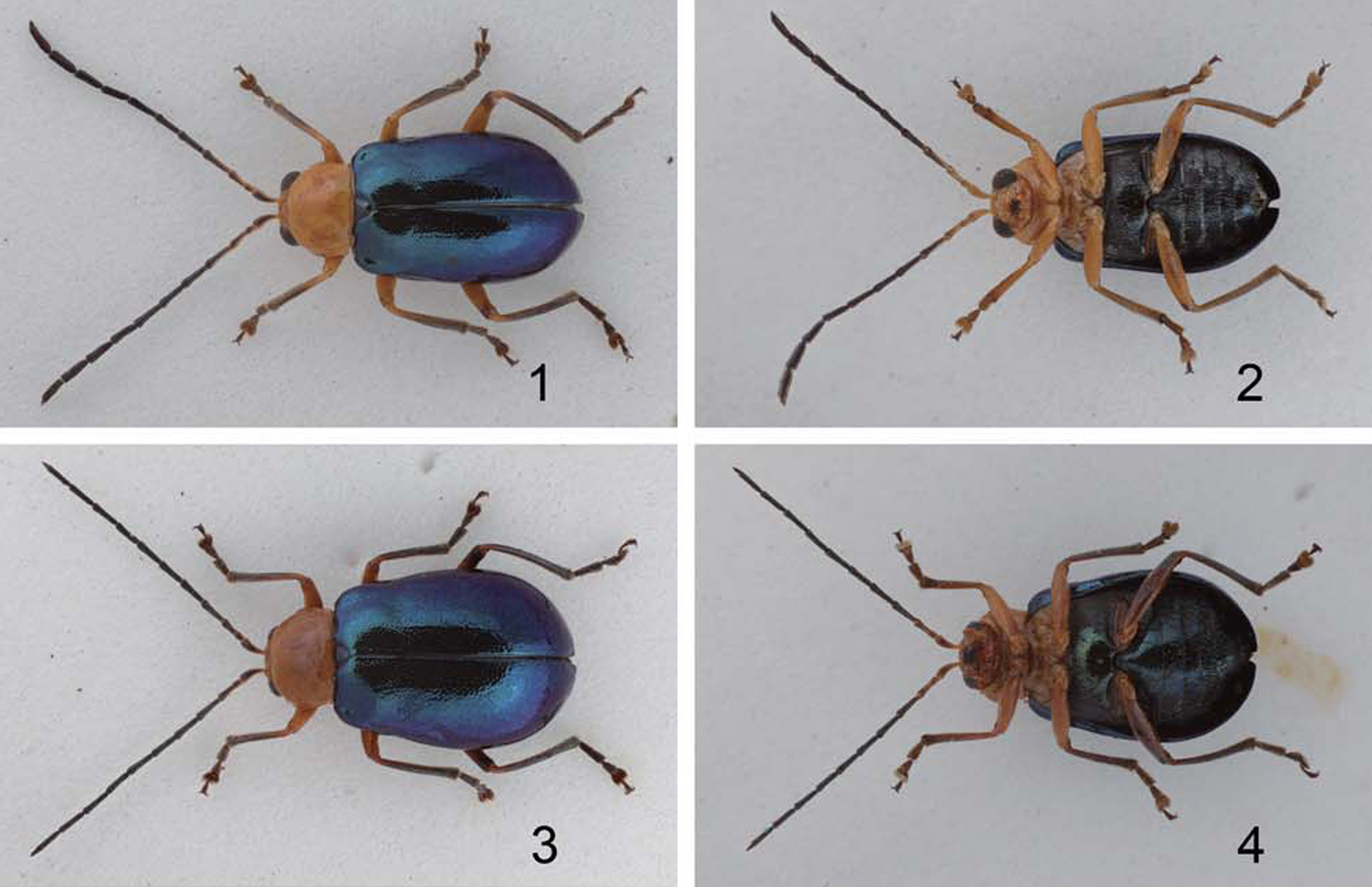
- C. elegans, male, (1) dorsal and (2) ventral views; C. elegans, female, (3) dorsal and (4) ventral views

Scientific classification
- Kingdom: Animalia
- Phylum: Arthropoda
- Clade: Pancrustacea
- Class: Insecta
- Order: Coleoptera
- Suborder: Polyphaga
- Infraorder: Cucujiformia
- Family: Chrysomelidae
- Genus: Cneorane
- Species: C. elegans

Binomial name
- Cneorane elegans Baly, 1874

= Cneorane elegans =

Species of beetle

Cneorane elegans (Korean: No-rang-ga-seum-cheong-saeg-ip-beol-re or Japanese: Kimune Ao Hamushi) is a leaf beetle species in the genus Cneorane found in Japan and Korea.
