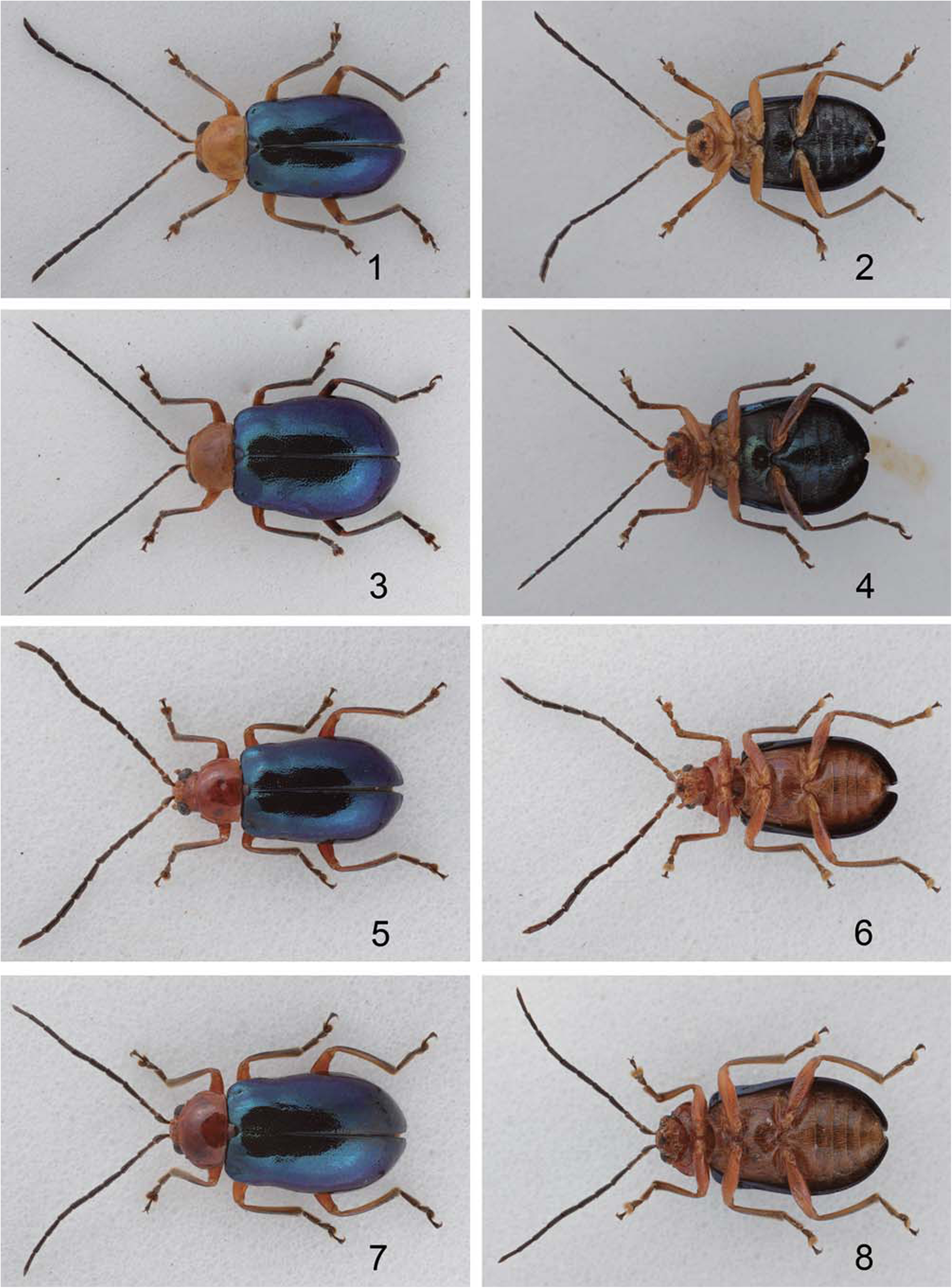
- C. elegans, male, (1) dorsal and (2) ventral views; C. elegans, female, (3) dorsal and (4) ventral views; C. violaceipennis, male, (5) dorsal and (6) ventral views; C. violaceipennis, female, (7) dorsal and (8) ventral views.

Scientific classification
- Kingdom: Animalia
- Phylum: Arthropoda
- Clade: Pancrustacea
- Class: Insecta
- Order: Coleoptera
- Suborder: Polyphaga
- Infraorder: Cucujiformia
- Family: Chrysomelidae
- Tribe: Luperini
- Genus: Cneorane; Baly, 1865

Species
- see text

= Cneorane =

Genus of beetles

Cneorane is a leaf beetle genus in the family Chrysomelidae.

== Species list ==
- Cneorane abdominalis (Jacoby, 1890)
- Cneorane alutacea Allard, 1889
- Cneorane apicicornis (Jacoby, 1890)
- Cneorane birmanica Jacoby, 1900
- Cneorane braeti Duvivier, 1892
- Cneorane burchardi (Weise, 1922)
- Cneorane cariosipennis (Fairmaire, 1888)
- Cneorane crassicornis (Fairmaire, 1889)
- Cneorane cribratissima (Fairmaire, 1888)
- Cneorane dohertyi Maulik, 1936
- Cneorane elegans Baly, 1874
- Cneorane ephippiata (Laboissiere, 1930)
- Cneorane episcopalis (Fairmaire, 1889)
- Cneorane erytrocephala (Fabricius, 1781)
- Cneorane feae Jacoby, 1892
- Cneorane femoralis Jacoby, 1888
- Cneorane fokiensis Weise, 1922
- Cneorane fulvicornis (Jacoby, 1889)
- Cneorane intermedia Fairmaire, 1889
- Cneorane malaisei Bryant, 1954
- Cneorane manipurana (Maulik, 1936)
- Cneorane minuta Medvedev, 1992
- Cneorane modesta Jacoby, 1886
- Cneorane nigripennis Medvedev, 2004
- Cneorane orientalis Jacoby, 1892
- Cneorane piceonotata Allard, 1899
- Cneorane rubicollis Hope, 1831
- Cneorane rubyana Maulik, 1936
- Cneorane rufocoerulea Fairmaire, 1888
- Cneorane rugulipennis Baly, 1886
- Cneorane semipurpurea Jacoby, 1886
- Cneorane siamensis Laboissiere, 1929
- Cneorane sikanga (Gressitt & Kimoto, 1963)
- Cneorane subaenea Jacoby, 1892
- Cneorane subcoerulescens Fairmaire, 1888
- Cneorane sudha Maulik, 1936
- Cneorane varipes Jacoby, 1896
- Cneorane violaceipennis Allard, 1889
- Cneorane wittmeri Kimoto, 2004
