= Caledonomorpha elegans =

Scientific classification
- Kingdom: Animalia
- Phylum: Arthropoda
- Class: Insecta
- Order: Coleoptera
- Suborder: Adephaga
- Family: Cicindelidae
- Tribe: Cicindelini
- Subtribe: Dromicina
- Genus: Caledonomorpha
- Species: C. elegans

Binomial name
- Caledonomorpha elegans Deuve, 1980

Species of beetle

Caledonomorpha elegans is a species in the beetle family Cicindelidae. It is found on the island of New Guinea.
