= Caledonomorpha darlingtoni =

Scientific classification
- Kingdom: Animalia
- Phylum: Arthropoda
- Class: Insecta
- Order: Coleoptera
- Suborder: Adephaga
- Family: Cicindelidae
- Genus: Caledonomorpha
- Species: C. darlingtoni

Binomial name
- Caledonomorpha darlingtoni Cassola, 1986

Species of beetle

Caledonomorpha darlingtoni is a species of tiger beetle. This species is found in New Guinea and Papua New Guinea.
