= Caledonomorpha =

Scientific classification
- Kingdom: Animalia
- Phylum: Arthropoda
- Class: Insecta
- Order: Coleoptera
- Suborder: Adephaga
- Superfamily: Caraboidea
- Family: Cicindelidae
- Tribe: Cicindelini
- Subtribe: Dromicina
- Genus: Caledonomorpha; W.Horn, 1897

Genus of beetles

Caledonomorpha is a genus in the tiger beetle family Cicindelidae.

The family Cicindelidae is sometimes treated as subfamily Cicindelinae within the ground beetle family Carabidae.

== Species ==
These 10 species belong to the genus Caledonomorpha:

- Caledonomorpha darlingtoni Cassola, 1986
- Caledonomorpha elegans Deuve, 1980
- Caledonomorpha jordani W.Horn, 1897
- Caledonomorpha loebli Cassola, 1989
- Caledonomorpha milneana Darlington, 1947
- Caledonomorpha papuana Ward, 1982
- Caledonomorpha poggii Cassola, 1986
- Caledonomorpha sedlaceki Cassola, 1986
- Caledonomorpha strazanaci Cassola, 1986
- Caledonomorpha ullrichi Cassola, 1989
