= Cimmerites =

Scientific classification
- Kingdom: Animalia
- Phylum: Arthropoda
- Class: Insecta
- Order: Coleoptera
- Suborder: Adephaga
- Family: Carabidae
- Subtribe: Trechina
- Genus: Cimmerites; Jeannel, 1928

Genus of beetles

Cimmerites is a genus of beetles in the family Carabidae, containing the following species:

- Cimmerites aibgensis Belousov, 1998
- Cimmerites convexus Belousov, 1998
- Cimmerites elegans Belousov, 1998
- Cimmerites grandis Belousov, 1998
- Cimmerites kryzhanovskii Belousov, 1998
- Cimmerites kurnakovi Jeannel, 1960
- Cimmerites morozovi Dolzhanski & Ljovuschkin, 1990
- Cimmerites ovatus Belousov, 1998
- Cimmerites serrulatus Winkler, 1926
- Cimmerites similis Belousov, 1998
- Cimmerites subcylindricus Belousov, 1998
- Cimmerites vagabundus Belousov, 1998
- Cimmerites zamotajlovi Belousov, 1998
