= Cimmerites elegans =

Scientific classification
- Domain: Eukaryota
- Kingdom: Animalia
- Phylum: Arthropoda
- Class: Insecta
- Order: Coleoptera
- Suborder: Adephaga
- Family: Carabidae
- Subfamily: Trechinae
- Tribe: Trechini
- Subtribe: Trechina
- Genus: Cimmerites
- Species: C. elegans

Binomial name
- Cimmerites elegans Belousov, 1998

Species of beetle

Cimmerites elegans is a species in the beetle family Carabidae. It is found in Russia.
