= Chrysoliocola =

Scientific classification
- Kingdom: Animalia
- Phylum: Arthropoda
- Class: Insecta
- Order: Coleoptera
- Suborder: Polyphaga
- Infraorder: Scarabaeiformia
- Family: Scarabaeidae
- Genus: Chrysoliocola; Alexis & Delpont 1998

Species
- Chrysoliocola elegans Kometani, 1938; Chrysoliocola nodieri Bourgoin, 1919

Genus of beetles

Chrysoliocola is a genus of scarab beetles.
