= Chrysoliocola elegans =

Scientific classification
- Kingdom: Animalia
- Phylum: Arthropoda
- Class: Insecta
- Order: Coleoptera
- Suborder: Polyphaga
- Infraorder: Scarabaeiformia
- Family: Scarabaeidae
- Genus: Chrysoliocola
- Species: C. elegans

Binomial name
- Chrysoliocola elegans Kometani, 1938

Species of beetle

Chrysoliocola elegans is a species of scarab beetles.
