= Corynesporina =

Scientific classification
- Domain: Eukaryota
- Kingdom: Fungi
- Division: Ascomycota
- Class: incertae sedis
- Genus: Corynesporina; Subramanian, 1994

Species
- Corynesporina elegans Subram. 1994

Genus of fungi

Corynesporina is a genus of fungi of unknown placement within Ascomycota.
