= Corynesporina elegans =

Scientific classification
- Domain: Eukaryota
- Kingdom: Fungi
- Division: Ascomycota
- Class: incertae sedis
- Genus: Corynesporina
- Species: C. elegans

Binomial name
- Corynesporina elegans Subramanian, 1994

Synonyms
- Corynesporina elegans Subram. 2009

Species of fungus

Corynesporina elegans is a species of fungus of unknown placement within Ascomycota.
