= Callizonus =

Scientific classification
- Kingdom: Animalia
- Phylum: Arthropoda
- Class: Insecta
- Order: Coleoptera
- Suborder: Polyphaga
- Infraorder: Cucujiformia
- Family: Curculionidae
- Genus: Callizonus (Schoenherr, 1826)

Species
- Callizonus novemdecimpunctatus Schoenherr, 1826; Callizonus regalis Schoenherr, 1826; Callizonus spectabilis Dejean; Callizonus spectabilis Klug, 1829

Genus of beetles

Callizonus is a genus of weevils. Species are known from Peru and the Caribbean islands.

Names brought to synonymy

- Callizonus elegans Guer., a synonym for Praepodes elegans
