= Acervularia pentagona =

Scientific classification
- Domain: Eukaryota
- Kingdom: Animalia
- Phylum: Cnidaria
- Subphylum: Anthozoa
- Class: †Rugosa
- Order: †Stauriida
- Family: †Acervulariidae
- Genus: †Acervularia
- Species: †A. pentagona

Binomial name
- †Acervularia pentagona (Goldfuss, 1826)

Species of plant

Acervularia pentagona is an extinct species of tabulate coral. It is described as the smallest Acervularia species known, and most closely resembles A. coronata.
