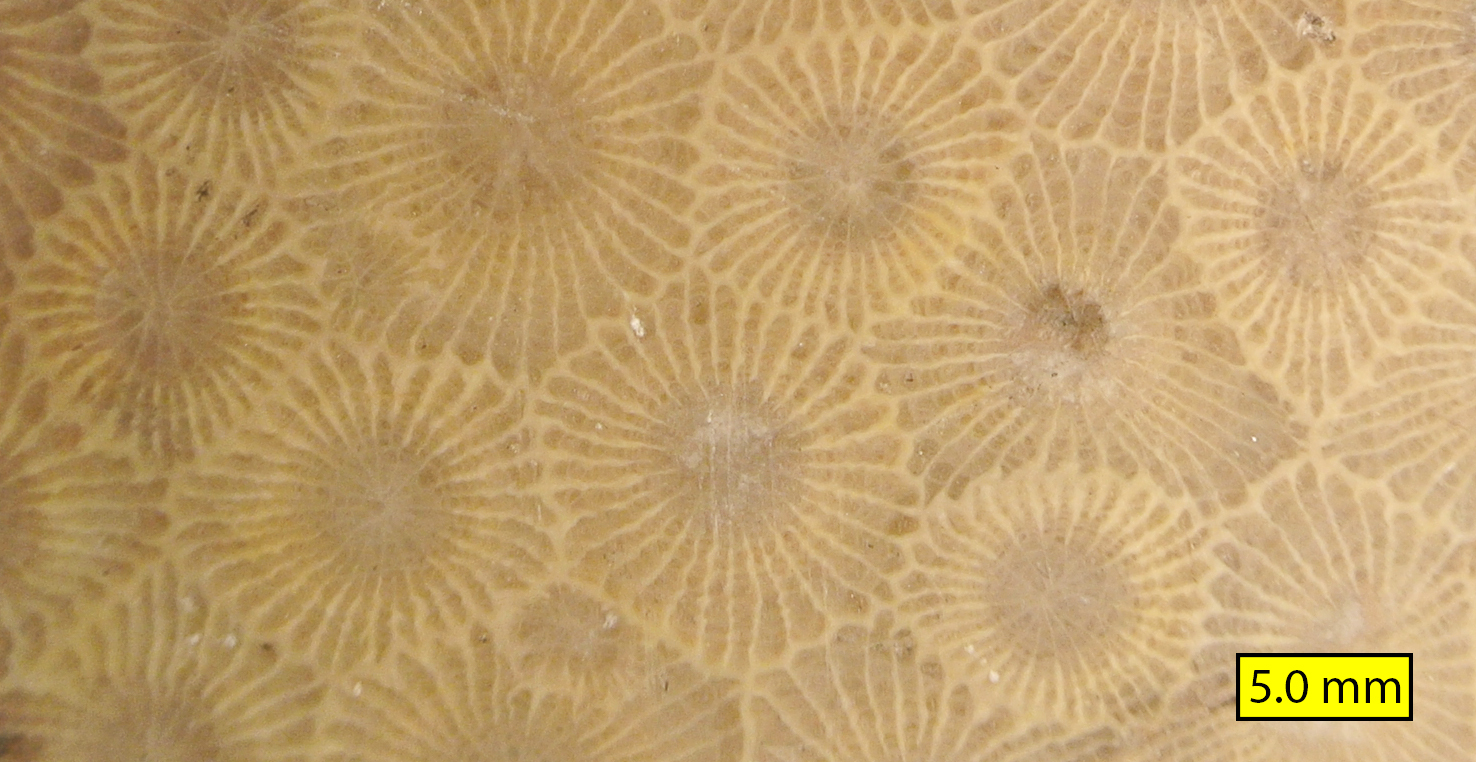
- Hexagonaria percarinata

Scientific classification
- Kingdom: Animalia
- Phylum: Cnidaria
- Subphylum: Anthozoa
- Class: †Rugosa
- Order: †Stauriida
- Family: †Disphyllidae
- Subfamily: †Hexagonariinae
- Genus: †Hexagonaria; Gürich, 1896

Species
- H. anna; H. cristata; H. fusiformis; H. percarinata; H. alpenensis; H. subcarinata; H. attenuate; H. potterensis; H. profunda; H. mirabilis

= Hexagonaria =

Hexagonaria Temporal range: Devonian 416–359.2 Ma

Extinct genus of corals

Hexagonaria is a genus of colonial rugose coral. Fossils are found in rock formations dating to the Devonian period, about 350 million years ago. Specimens of Hexagonaria can be found in most of the rock formations of the Traverse Group in Michigan. Fossils of this genus form Petoskey stones, the state stone of Michigan. They can be seen and found in most Midwestern U.S. states.

Hexagonaria is a common constituent of the coral reefs exposed in Devonian Fossil Gorge below the Coralville Lake spillway and in many exposures of the Coralville Formation in the vicinity of Coralville, Iowa.

== Species Identification ==
Based on Erwin C. Stumm's Corals of the Traverse Group of Michigan Part 13, Hexagonaria, published in 1970. Notably, other species of Hexagonaria occur in rocks outside the Michigan Basin; those other species are not covered by the chart below and may overlap with the species below in size and numbers of septa. Other features diagnose the differences between species; the metrics below merely represent handy features for diagnosis in the Michigan Basin, not comprehensive diagnoses.

Species	Corallites (diameter)	Septa (count)
H. anna	12–16 mm	32–44
H. cristata	16–20 mm	36–44
H. fusiformis	6–10 mm	34–38
H. percarinata	~10 mm	38–40
H. alpenensis	2–6 mm	26–28
H. subcarinata	8–12 mm	30–34
H. attenuate	8–14 mm	30–38
H. potterensis	4–15 mm	36–38
H. profunda	13–15 mm	38–42

== Image Gallery ==
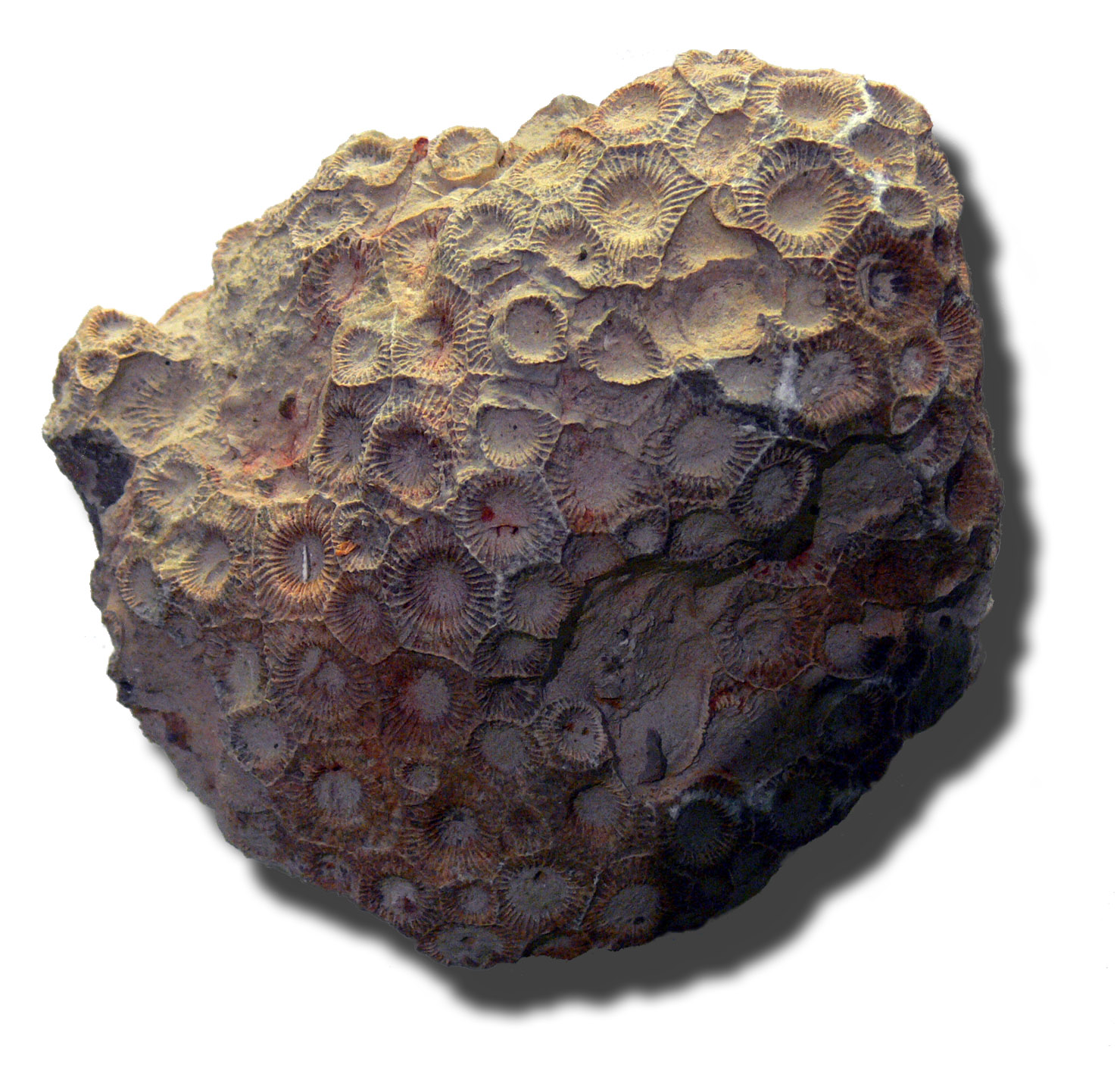
Hexagonaria mirabilis

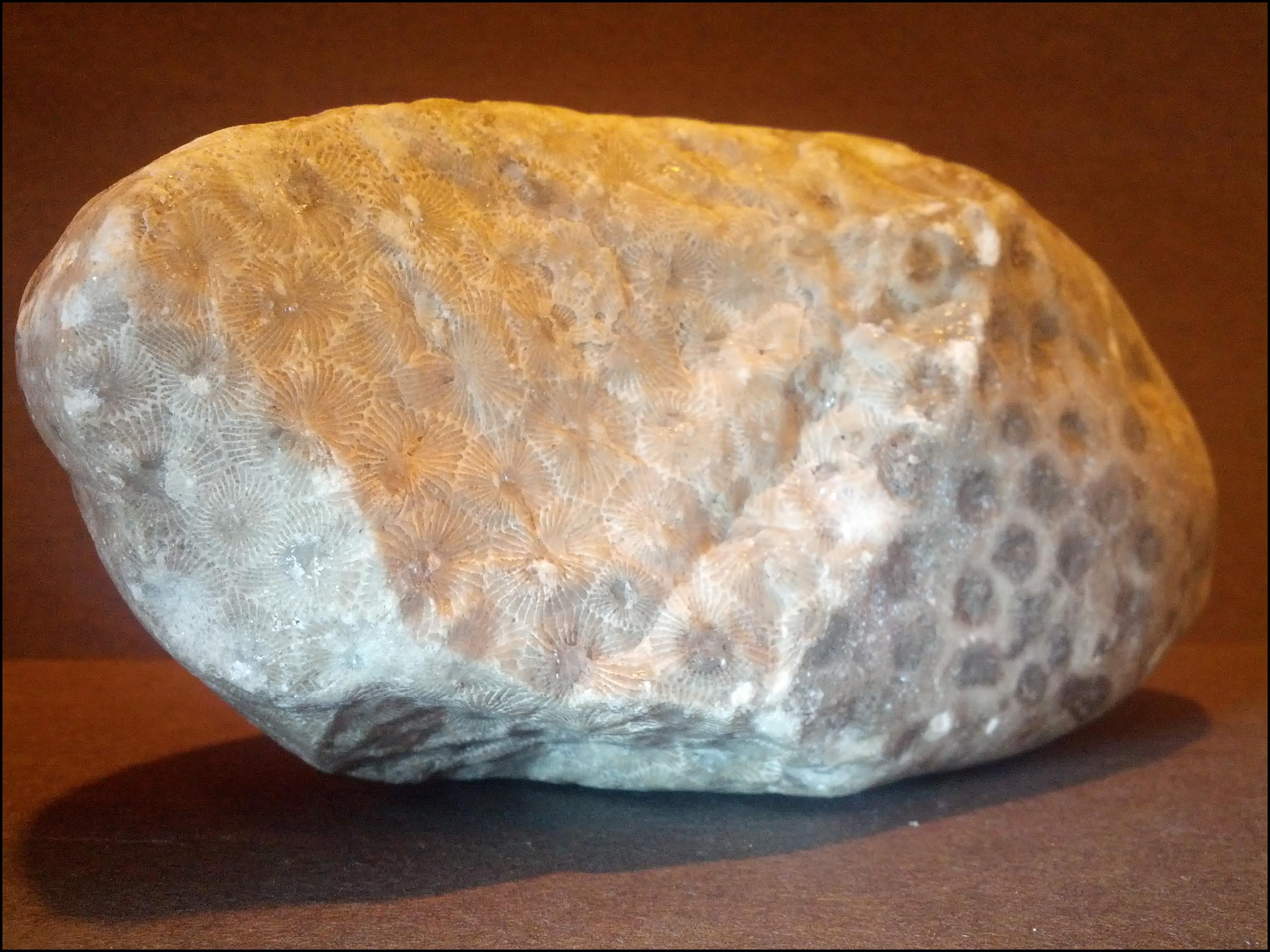
H. percarinata, "Petoskey stone"
