= Petoskey, Michigan =

- City
- City of Petoskey
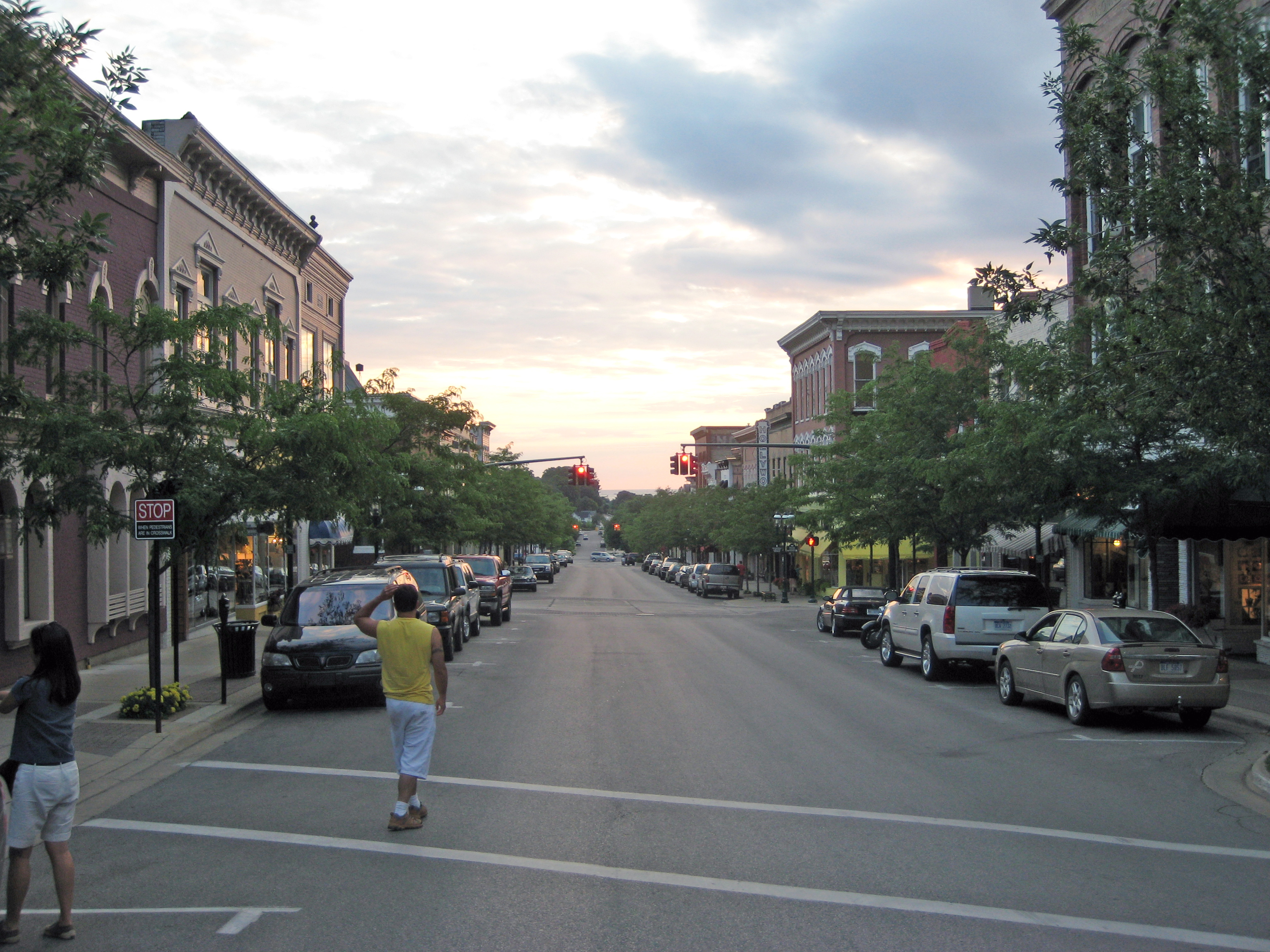
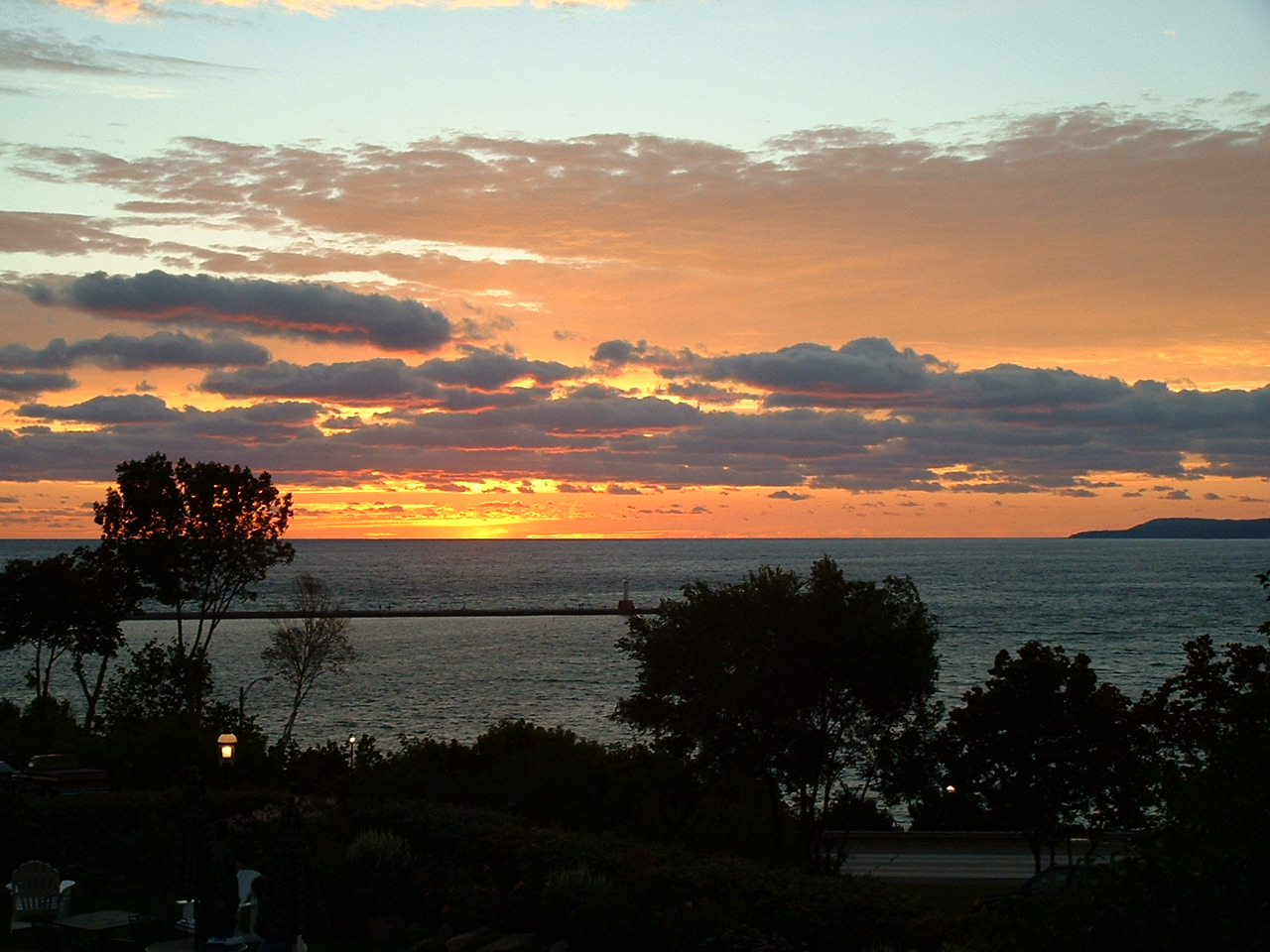
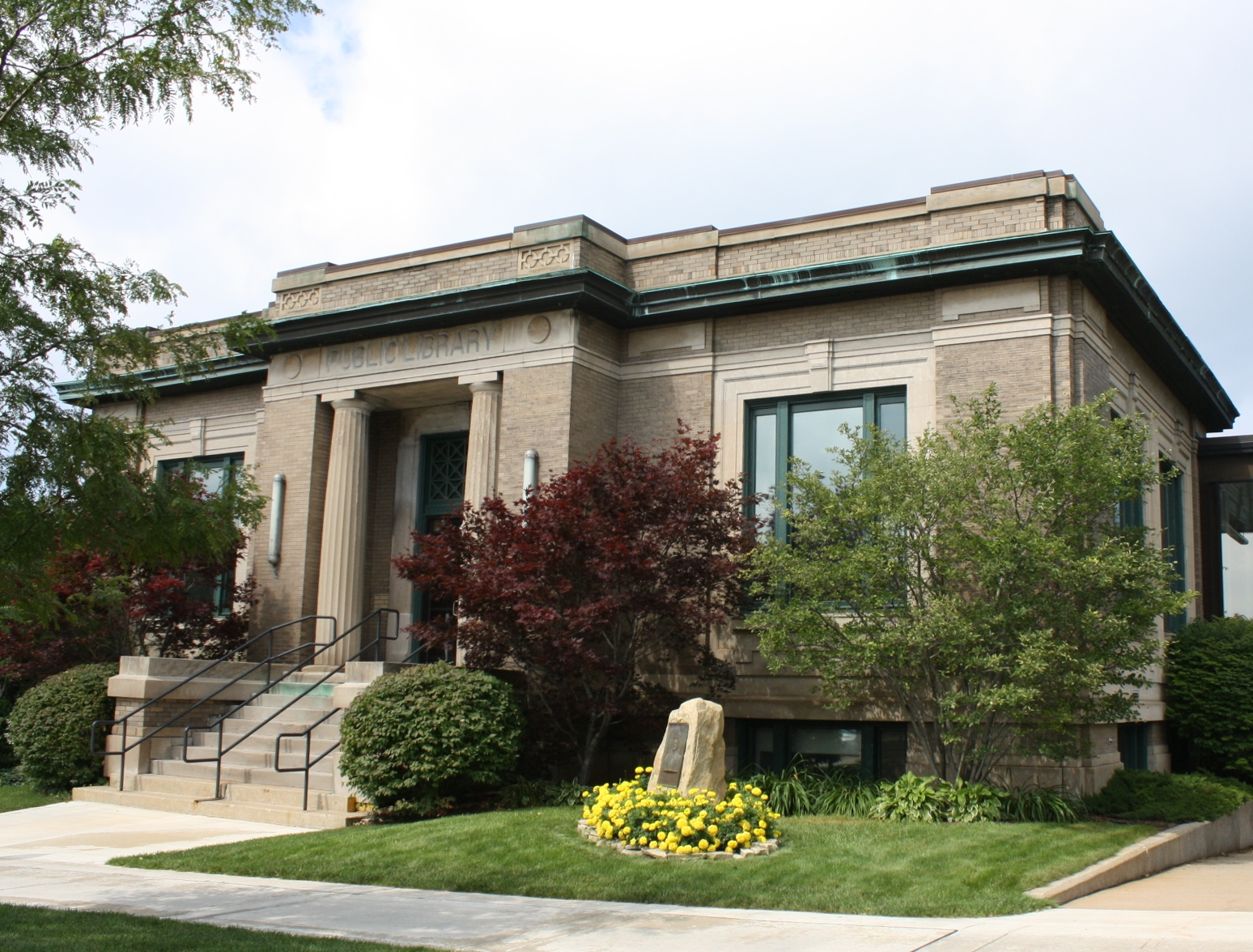
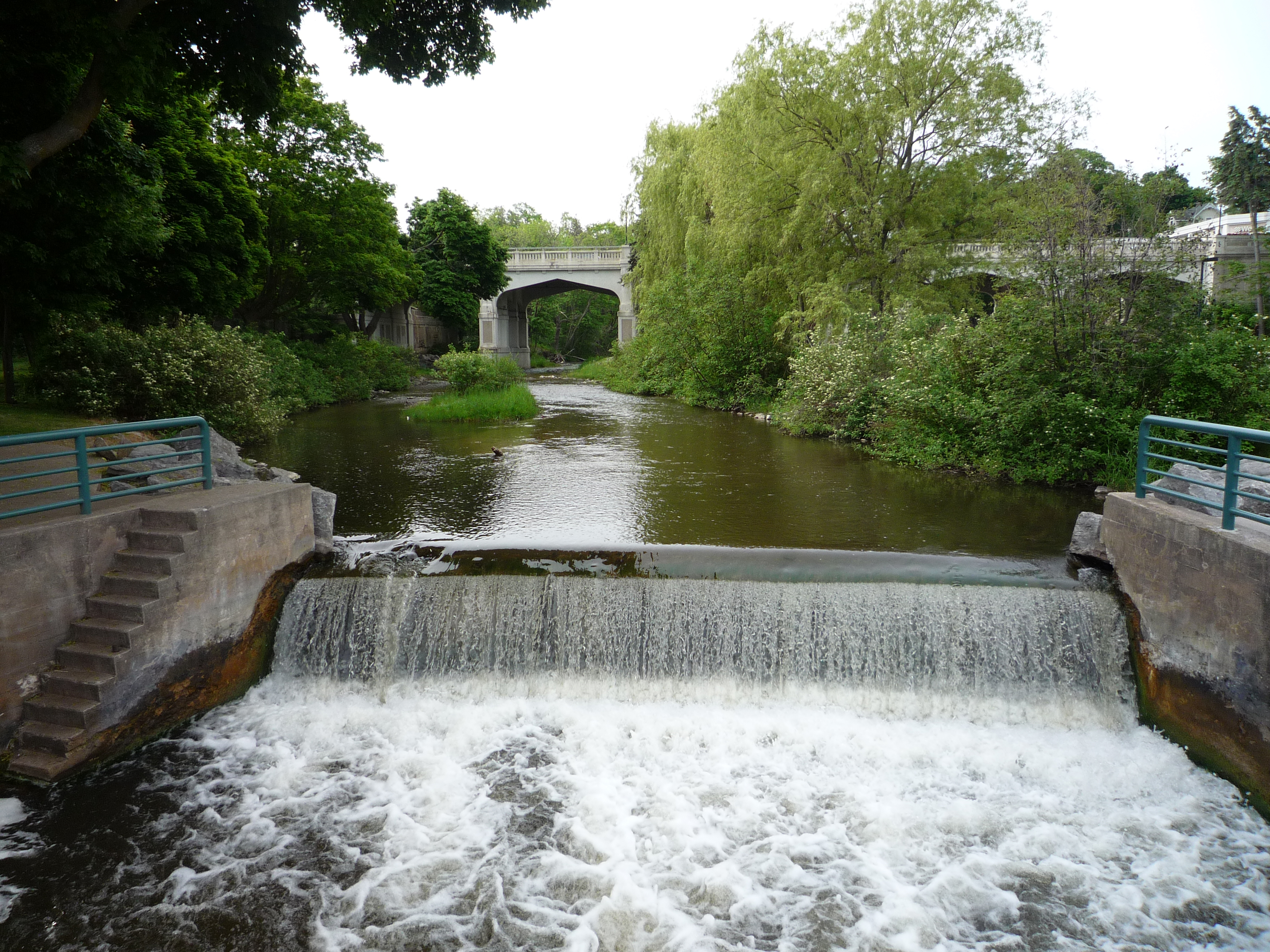
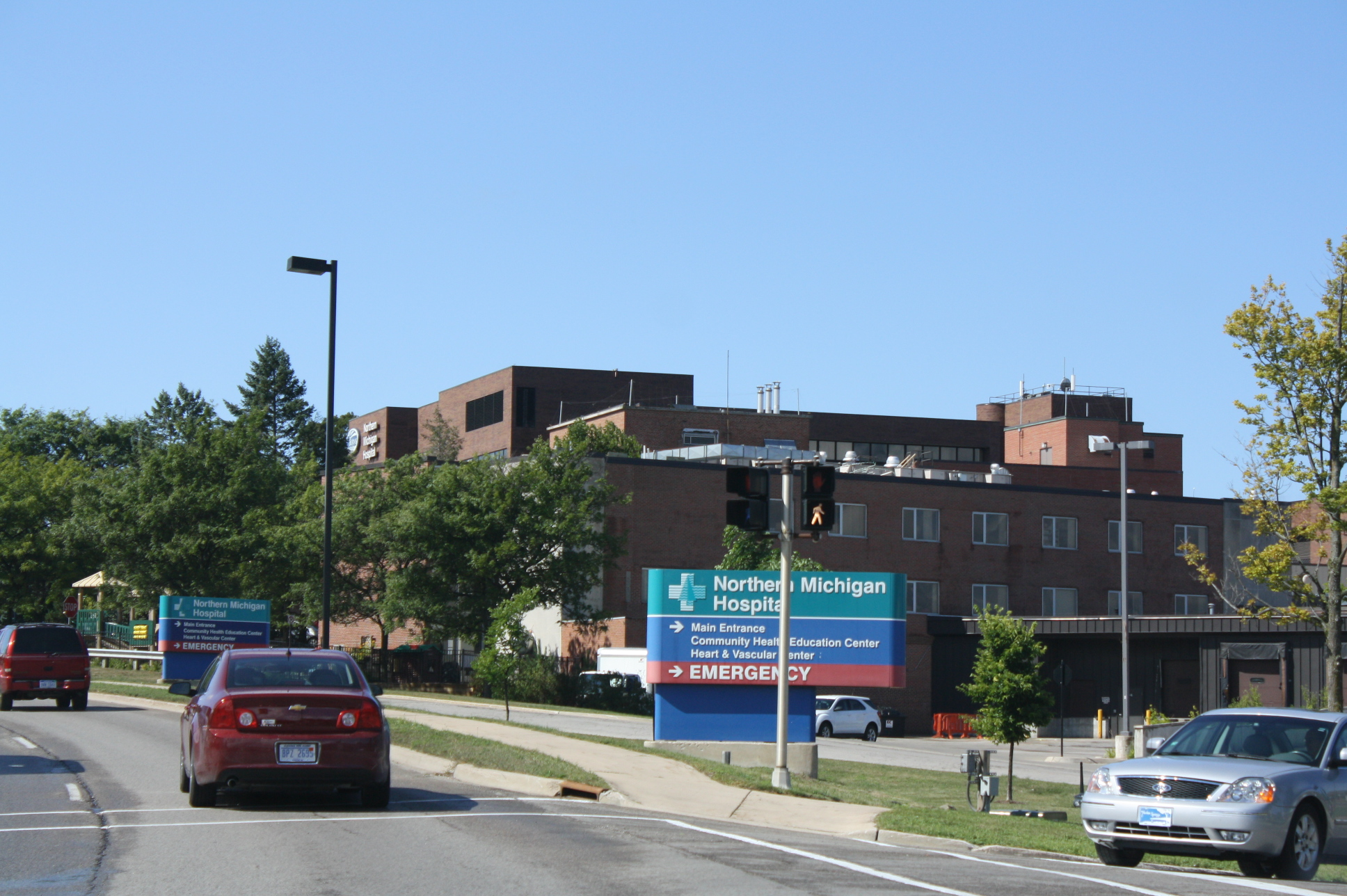
- Downtown Petoskey Little Traverse Bay at sunset Crooked Tree Arts Center The Bear River McLaren Northern Michigan Hospital

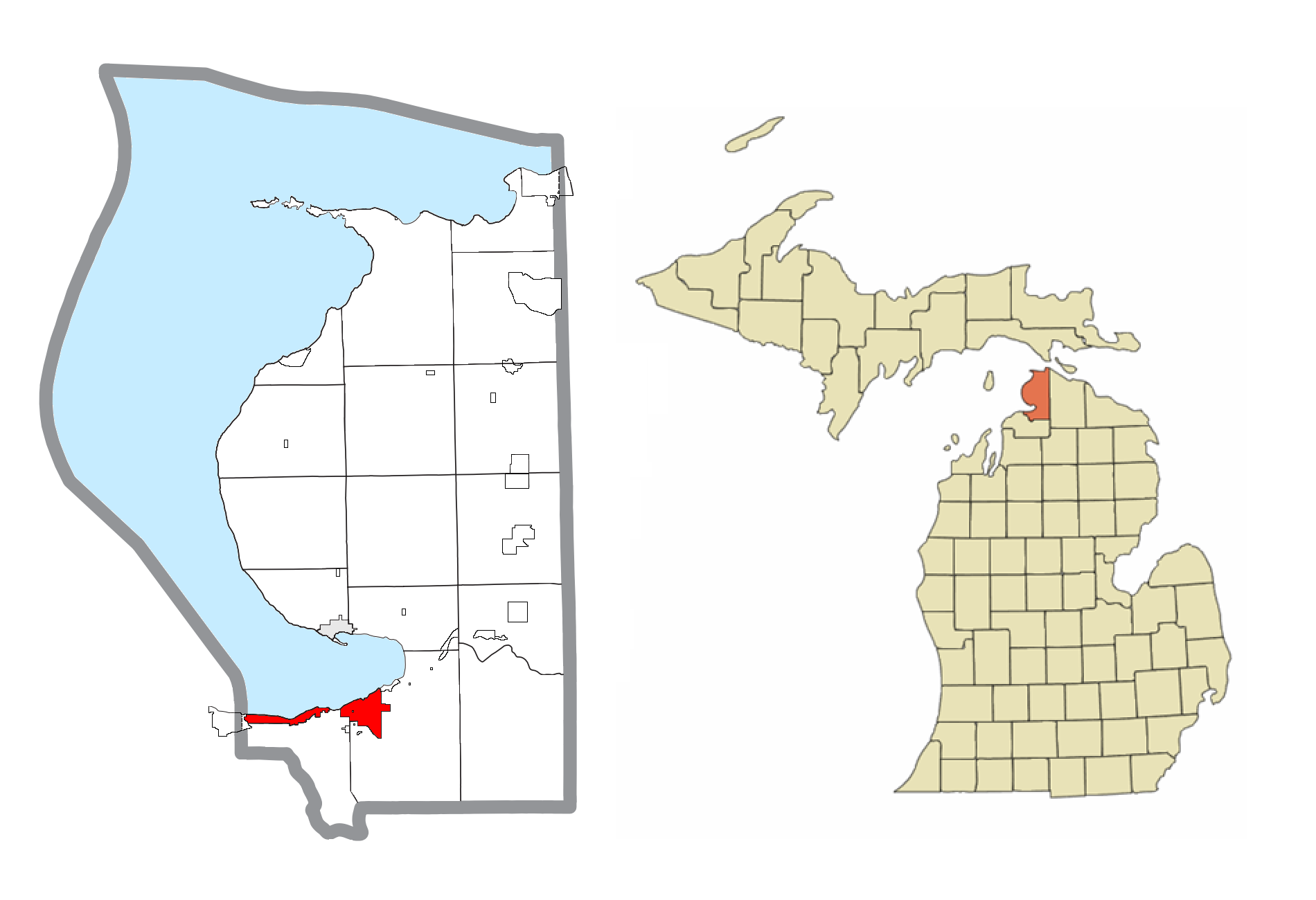
- Location within Emmet County

- Location within the state of Michigan Location within the United States
- Coordinates: 45°22′24″N 84°57′19″W
- Country: United States
- State: Michigan
- County: Emmet
- Incorporated: 1879 (village); 1895 (city)
- Named for: Petosegay

Government
  - Type: Mayor–council
  - Mayor: John Murphy
  - Manager: Shane Horn

Area
  - Total: 5.34 sq mi (13.82 km^{2})
  - Land: 5.15 sq mi (13.33 km^{2})
  - Water: 0.19 sq mi (0.49 km^{2})
- Elevation: 663 ft (202 m)

Population (2020)
  - Total: 5,877
  - Density: 1,141.9/sq mi (440.88/km^{2})
- Time zone: UTC-5 (EST)
  - Summer (DST): UTC-4 (EDT)
- ZIP code: 49770
- Area code: 231
- FIPS code: 26-63820
- GNIS feature ID: 0634731
- Website: www.petoskey.us

Petoskey (/pəˈtɒski/ pə-TOSS-kee) is the largest city in and the county seat of Emmet County, Michigan, and is the largest settlement within the county. Petoskey has a population of 5,877 at the 2020 census, up from 5,670 at the 2010 census.

Petoskey is part of Northern Michigan, and is one of the northernmost cities in Michigan's Lower Peninsula. Petoskey is located on the southern shore of Little Traverse Bay, a bay of Lake Michigan. Petoskey sits directly across the bay from Harbor Springs, another Emmet County city. Petoskey is a popular Midwestern resort town.

Petoskey lends its name to the Petoskey stone, a fossilized coral that is the state stone of Michigan.

== History ==
=== Odawa inhabitants ===
The Little Traverse Bay area was long inhabited by indigenous peoples, including the Odawa people. The name Petoskey is said to mean "The rising sun, the day’s first light, or the sun’s first rays moving across the water," in the language of the Odawa. After the 1836 Treaty of Washington, Odawa Chief Ignatius Petosega (1787–1885) took the opportunity to purchase lands near the Bear River. Petosega's father was Antoine Carre, a French Canadian fur trader and his mother was Odawa.

=== Early Presbyterian missions ===
By the 1850s, several religious groups had established missions near the Little Traverse Bay. A Mormon offshoot had been based at Beaver Island, the Jesuit missionaries had been based at L'arbre Croche and Michilimackinac, with a Catholic presence in Harbor Springs, then known as "Little Traverse". Andrew Porter, a Presbyterian missionary, arrived at the village of Bear River (as it was then called) in 1852.

=== Pioneer commercial interests ===
Amos Fox and Hirem Obed Rose were pioneer entrepreneurs who had made money during both the California Gold Rush and at Northport selling lumber and goods to passing ships. Originally based at Northport, in the 1850s Rose and Fox (or Fox & Rose) expanded their business interests to Charlevoix and Petoskey. Rose also earned income as part of a business partnership that extended the railroad from Walton Junction to Traverse City. H.O. Rose, along with Archibald Buttars, established a general merchandise business in Petoskey.

After the partnership split, Rose relocated to Petoskey and in 1873 built the first dock in the town. When the Grand Rapids and Indiana Railroad was about to be extended into the Bay View area, Rose purchased much land in that area, as well as trolley cars, to enable transport between Petoskey and Bay View. Rose also developed the first general store, extensive lime quarries (Michigan Limestone Company, aka Petoskey Lime Company;), building the Arlington Hotel, and lumbering enterprises, and harbor improvements in 1893. He served as first president of the village and officiated at early commemorative public events. Rose's influence on the city was also commemorated by the naming of the H. O. Rose room at the Perry Hotel.

=== Passenger Pigeons ===
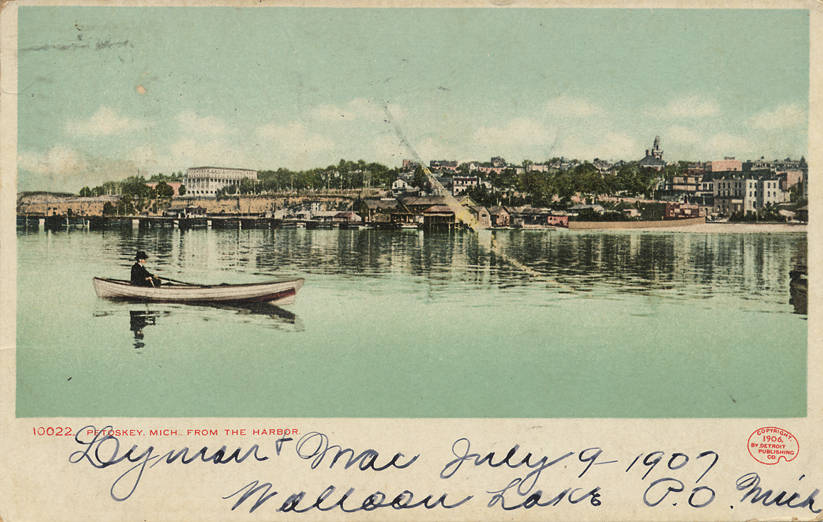
Petoskey viewed from the harbor, circa 1900s

In the late 19th century, Petoskey was in the region of Northern Michigan where 50,000 passenger pigeon birds were killed daily in massive hunts, leading to their complete extinction in the early 20th century. A state historical marker memorializes these events, including the last great nesting of the passenger pigeons at Crooked Lake in 1878. One hunter was reputed to have personally killed "a million birds" and earned $60,000, the equivalent of $1 million today.

Petoskey is noted for a high concentration of ancient fossil coral, now named Petoskey stones, designated as the state stone of Michigan.

This city was the northern terminus of the Chicago and West Michigan Railway.

With members descended from the numerous bands in northern Michigan, the Little Traverse Bay Band is a federally recognized tribe that has its headquarters at nearby Harbor Springs, Michigan. It also owns and operates a gaming casino in Petoskey.

== Geography ==
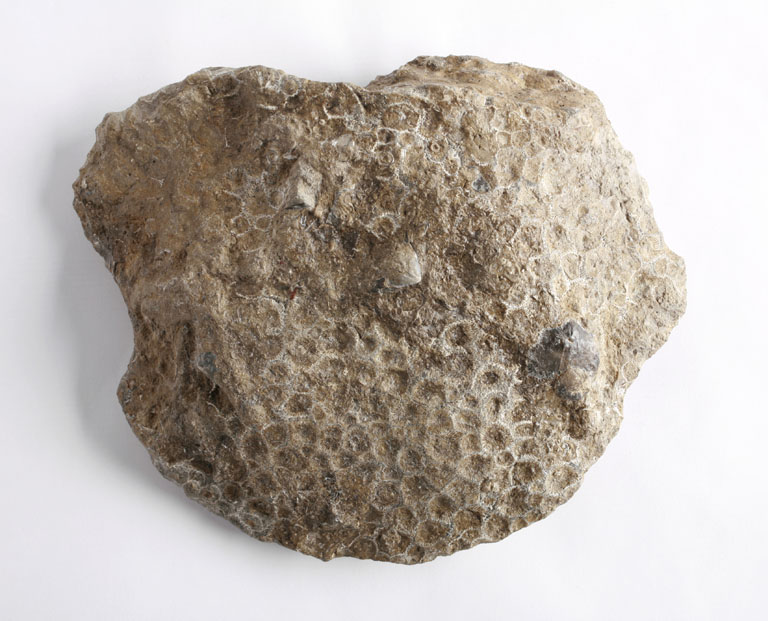
The Petoskey stone, a form of ancient fossil coral found in abundance in the area; it is named after the town.

Part of Northern Michigan, Petoskey is on the southeast shore of the Little Traverse Bay of Lake Michigan at the mouth of the Bear River. According to the United States Census Bureau, the city has a total area of 5.29 square miles (13.70 km^{2}), of which 5.09 square miles (13.18 km^{2}) is land and 0.20 square miles (0.52 km^{2}) is water.

== Demographics ==
Historical population
| Census | Pop. | Note | %± |
|---|---|---|---|
| 1880 | 1,815 | | — |
| 1890 | 2,872 | | 58.2% |
| 1900 | 5,285 | | 84.0% |
| 1910 | 4,778 | | −9.6% |
| 1920 | 5,064 | | 6.0% |
| 1930 | 5,740 | | 13.3% |
| 1940 | 6,019 | | 4.9% |
| 1950 | 6,468 | | 7.5% |
| 1960 | 6,138 | | −5.1% |
| 1970 | 6,342 | | 3.3% |
| 1980 | 6,097 | | −3.9% |
| 1990 | 6,056 | | −0.7% |
| 2000 | 6,080 | | 0.4% |
| 2010 | 5,670 | | −6.7% |
| 2020 | 5,877 | | 3.7% |
U.S. Decennial Census

=== 2020 census ===
As of the 2020 census, Petoskey had a population of 5,877. The median age was 43.0 years. 16.6% of residents were under the age of 18 and 23.5% of residents were 65 years of age or older. For every 100 females there were 91.9 males, and for every 100 females age 18 and over there were 88.2 males age 18 and over.

99.7% of residents lived in urban areas, while 0.3% lived in rural areas.

There were 2,775 households in Petoskey, of which 20.8% had children under the age of 18 living in them. Of all households, 35.6% were married-couple households, 21.3% were households with a male householder and no spouse or partner present, and 36.4% were households with a female householder and no spouse or partner present. About 42.8% of all households were made up of individuals and 17.9% had someone living alone who was 65 years of age or older.

There were 3,533 housing units, of which 21.5% were vacant. The homeowner vacancy rate was 1.4% and the rental vacancy rate was 6.3%.

Racial composition as of the 2020 census
| Race | Number | Percent |
|---|---|---|
| White | 5,218 | 88.8% |
| Black or African American | 43 | 0.7% |
| American Indian and Alaska Native | 201 | 3.4% |
| Asian | 37 | 0.6% |
| Native Hawaiian and Other Pacific Islander | 5 | 0.1% |
| Some other race | 47 | 0.8% |
| Two or more races | 326 | 5.5% |
| Hispanic or Latino (of any race) | 140 | 2.4% |

=== 2010 census ===
As of the census of 2010, there were 5,670 people, 2,538 households, and 1,319 families residing in the city. The population density was 1,113.9 inhabitants per square mile (430.1/km^{2}). There were 3,359 housing units at an average density of 659.9 per square mile (254.8/km^{2}). The racial makeup of the city was 91.7% White, 0.7% African American, 4.7% Native American, 0.4% Asian, 0.5% from other races, and 2.1% from two or more races. Hispanic or Latino of any race were 1.9% of the population.

There were 2,538 households, of which 24.3% had children under the age of 18 living with them, 36.7% were married couples living together, 11.8% had a female householder with no husband present, 3.5% had a male householder with no wife present, and 48.0% were non-families. 39.2% of all households were made up of individuals, and 12.2% had someone living alone who was 65 years of age or older. The average household size was 2.10 and the average family size was 2.81.

The median age in the city was 39.8 years. 19.4% of residents were under the age of 18; 11.9% were between the ages of 18 and 24; 24.5% were from 25 to 44; 28.1% were from 45 to 64; and 16.1% were 65 years of age or older. The gender makeup of the city was 47.3% male and 52.7% female.

=== 2000 census ===
As of the census of 2000, there were 6,080 people, 2,700 households, and 1,447 families residing in the city. The population density was 1,210.9 inhabitants per square mile (467.5/km^{2}). There were 3,342 housing units at an average density of 665.6 per square mile (257.0/km^{2}). The racial makeup of the city was 94.18% White, 0.33% African American, 3.17% Native American, 0.81% Asian, 0.02% Pacific Islander, 0.20% from other races, and 1.30% from two or more races. Hispanic or Latino of any race were 1.17% of the population.

There were 2,700 households, out of which 27.5% had children under the age of 18 living with them, 39.8% were married couples living together, 11.0% had a female householder with no husband present, and 46.4% were non-families. 39.4% of all households were made up of individuals, and 14.6% had someone living alone who was 65 years of age or older. The average household size was 2.14 and the average family size was 2.89.

In the city, the population was spread out, with 23.0% under the age of 18, 9.6% from 18 to 24, 28.5% from 25 to 44, 21.7% from 45 to 64, and 17.3% who were 65 years of age or older. The median age was 39 years. For every 100 females, there were 85.6 males. For every 100 females age 18 and over, there were 81.2 males.

The median income for a household in the city was $33,657, and the median income for a family was $48,168. Males had a median income of $35,875 versus $25,114 for females. The per capita income for the city was $20,259. About 6.6% of families and 12.0% of the population were below the poverty line, including 8.6% of those under age 18 and 8.4% of those age 65 or over.

== Transportation ==
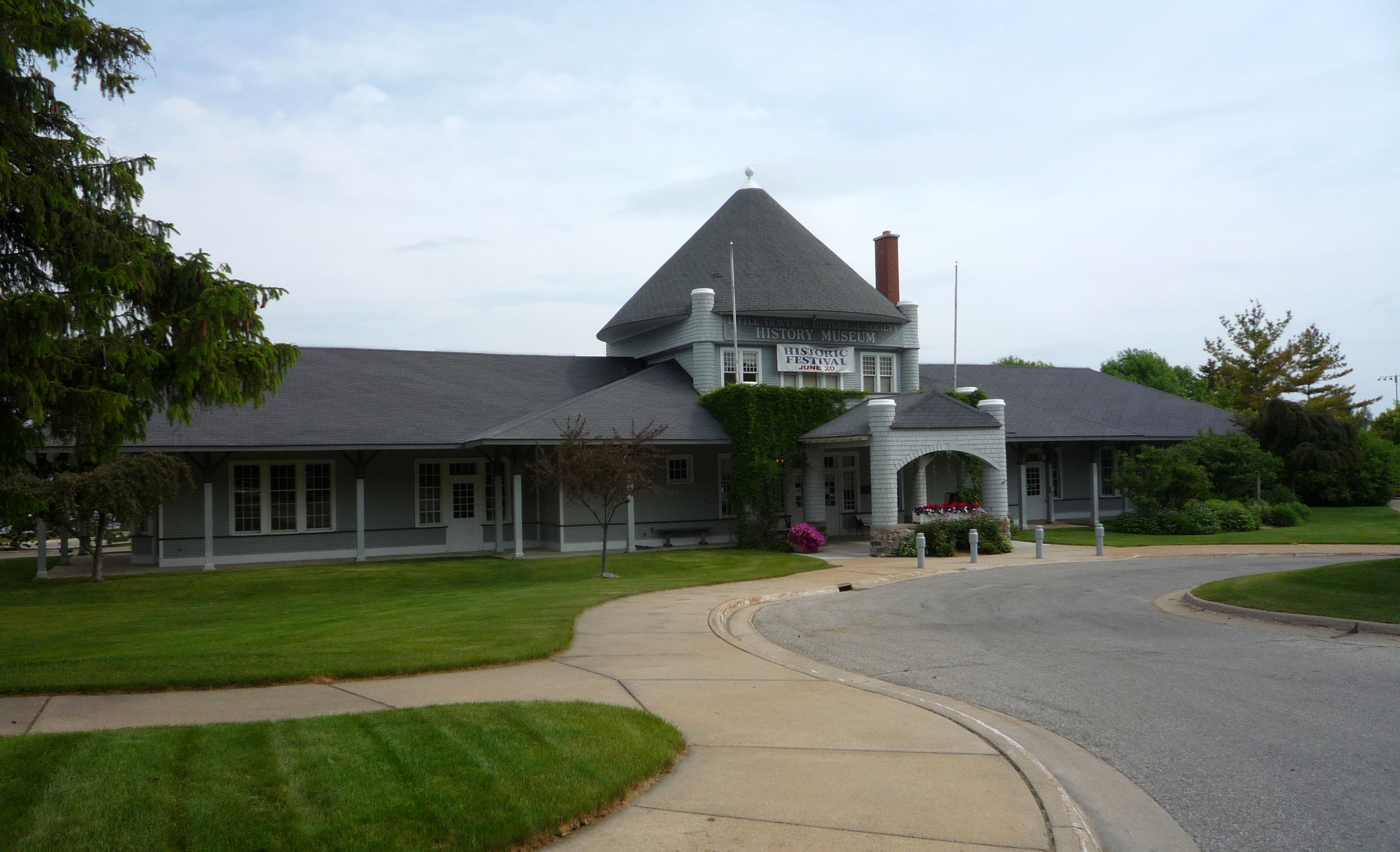
The Little Traverse History Museum is housed in the former Chicago and West Michigan Railroad depot.

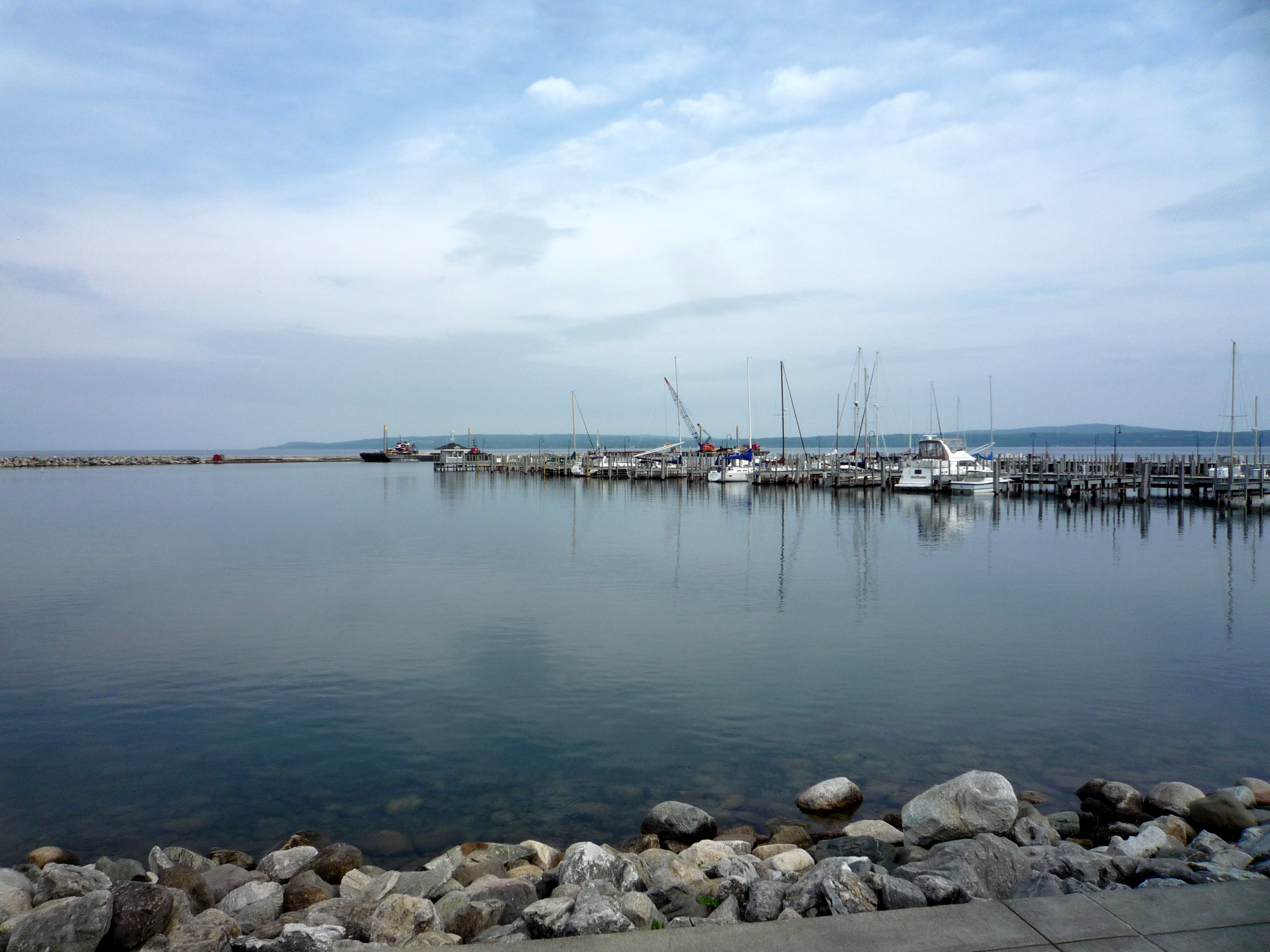
Petoskey Marina

=== Airports ===
- The nearest airports with scheduled passenger service are in Pellston Regional Airport and Traverse City Cherry Capital Airport.

=== Bus ===
- Indian Trails provides daily intercity bus service between St. Ignace and East Lansing, Michigan and between Grand Rapids, Michigan and Petoskey. Transfer between the two lines is possible in Petoskey.
- The EMGO/SRR bus service runs Monday through Friday, from Petoskey, Mackinaw City, Harbor Springs, and to multiple locations in Emmet County with flexible routes within many communities along the way.

=== Rail ===
- Freight rail service to Petoskey is provided by the Great Lakes Central Railroad; however, the tracks are owned by the state of Michigan. Freight traffic includes plastic pellets delivered to a rail/truck transload facility for Petoskey Plastics. Occasional passenger/special excursion trains to Petoskey occurred but have since stopped since access to the rails through downtown were removed.

Historically, the Pennsylvania Railroad's Northern Arrow, the Pere Marquette Railway's Resort Special and other trains provided passenger traffic to Petoskey and Bay View, Michigan from as far as Chicago, St. Louis, Cincinnati and Detroit but these were discontinued in the late 20th century. The Pere Marquette trains (and later the Chesapeake and Ohio Railway) used its station, and the Pennsylvania Railroad its own separate station. The last Chesapeake and Ohio (successor to the Pere Marquette) trains were discontinued by 1963, thus ending scheduled passenger train service to Petoskey. Both Depots still remain - one used for business and other a Museum.

=== Marina ===
- The City of Petoskey Department of Parks and Recreation operates a 144-slip marina located in Bayfront Park. The marina offers seasonal and transient slips, gasoline, diesel fuel, boat launch, wireless internet, 30/50 AMP power, water, pump-out, restroom/showers, playground and adjacent park grounds. The Gaslight District is connected to Bayfront Park via a pedestrian tunnel. The marina received initial designation as a "Michigan Clean Marina" in May 2007 and was recertified in 2010.

=== Major highways ===
- US 31 is a major highway running through the heart of the city. It continues southerly toward Charlevoix, Traverse City and Muskegon and northerly to a terminus near Mackinaw City.
- US 131 has its northern terminus in the city and continues southerly toward Cadillac and Grand Rapids.
- M-119, accessible off US 31 east of the city and Bay View, continues around the north side of Little Traverse Bay to Harbor Springs and then to Cross Village.
- C-58 begins at C-81 just east of the city and continues to Wolverine.
- C-81 is a north–south route passing just to the east of the city.

== Education ==
Among the many colleges in Michigan includes North Central Michigan College, located in Petoskey. The Public Schools of Petoskey consists of a high school (Petoskey High School), a middle school, and four elementary schools. Additionally, Petoskey Public Schools has a Montessori education building.

== Notable people ==
- Megan Boone, actress, star of NBC series The Blacklist
- Katie Brown, television host
- Bruce Catton, U.S. Civil War historian
- Grace Chandler, photographer based in Petoskey
- Famous Last Words, post-hardcore band
- B. Anne Gehman, psychic medium and author
- Alan Hewitt, musician and keyboardist for the Moody Blues, formerly worked with Earth, Wind and Fire
- Ron Pickarski, award-winning vegan chef
- Michigan Rattlers, rock band
- Claude E. Shannon, Mathematician, Electrical Engineer, Computer Scientist, Cryptographer. Father of Information theory.
- Mark Smolinski, NFL fullback 1961–1968 for the Baltimore Colts and the New York Jets
- Sufjan Stevens, Academy Award and Grammy-nominated singer-songwriter.
- John Tanton, ophthalmologist, occasionally labeled white nationalist and anti-immigration activist, an account of his charitable works can be found in the biography authored by John F. Rohe

== Media ==
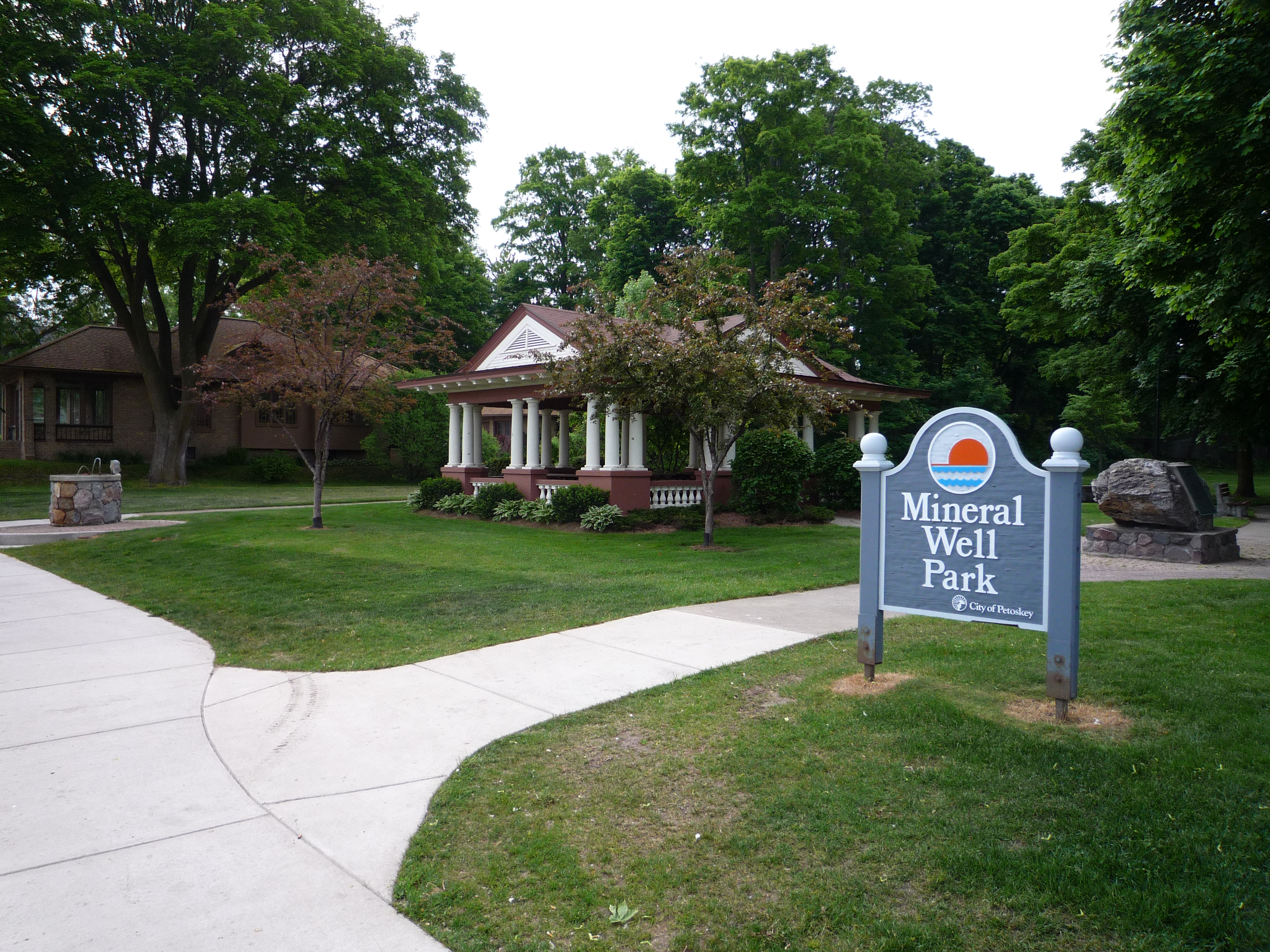
Mineral Well Park is one of many sites and buildings in Petoskey listed on the National Register of Historic Places.

Newspaper
- Petoskey News-Review

Magazines

- Traverse, is published monthly with a focus on regional interests.

Local AM radio

- WWMN (1110) - Talk
- WMKT (1270) - News/Talk (licensed to Charlevoix, studios in Petoskey)
- WMBN (1340) - Sports Talk Radio

Local FM radio

- WTLI (89.3) - contemporary Christian "Smile FM"
- WTCK (90.9) - Catholic religious (Charlevoix)
- WJOG (91.3) - contemporary Christian "Smile FM"
- WBCM (93.5) - classic rock; simulcast of WKLT-FM Kalkaska
- WLXT (96.3) - adult contemporary
- WAWM (98.9) - contemporary Christian "Air1"
- W259AH (99.7) - translator of WPHN-FM Gaylord (religious)
- WICV (100.9) - classical (East Jordan); simulcast of WIAA-FM Interlochen
- WMKC (102.9) - New Country (Indian River, Michigan, studios in Traverse City and Cheboygan)
- WCMW (103.9) - CMU Public Radio (Harbor Springs)
- WKHQ (105.9) - CHR/top 40 (licensed to Charlevoix, studios in Petoskey)
- WLJD (107.9) - Christian (Charlevoix); simulcast of WLJN-FM

== Climate ==
This climatic region has large seasonal temperature differences, with warm to hot (and often humid) summers and cold (sometimes severely cold) winters. According to the Köppen Climate Classification system, Petoskey has a humid continental climate, abbreviated "Dfb" on climate maps. The city’s proximity to Lake Michigan results in significant seasonal lag, with August and February being the hottest and coldest months respectively.

Climate data for Petoskey, Michigan (1991–2020 normals, extremes 1891–present)
| Month | Jan | Feb | Mar | Apr | May | Jun | Jul | Aug | Sep | Oct | Nov | Dec | Year |
|---|---|---|---|---|---|---|---|---|---|---|---|---|---|
| Record high °F (°C) | 56 (13) | 63 (17) | 84 (29) | 93 (34) | 94 (34) | 96 (36) | 101 (38) | 99 (37) | 96 (36) | 87 (31) | 76 (24) | 65 (18) | 101 (38) |
| Mean daily maximum °F (°C) | 27.4 (−2.6) | 28.4 (−2.0) | 36.6 (2.6) | 48.1 (8.9) | 60.8 (16.0) | 70.3 (21.3) | 75.2 (24.0) | 74.9 (23.8) | 68.9 (20.5) | 56.0 (13.3) | 43.7 (6.5) | 33.6 (0.9) | 52.0 (11.1) |
| Daily mean °F (°C) | 21.2 (−6.0) | 21.1 (−6.1) | 28.4 (−2.0) | 39.9 (4.4) | 51.7 (10.9) | 61.7 (16.5) | 67.2 (19.6) | 66.8 (19.3) | 60.2 (15.7) | 48.6 (9.2) | 37.7 (3.2) | 28.3 (−2.1) | 44.4 (6.9) |
| Mean daily minimum °F (°C) | 15.0 (−9.4) | 13.7 (−10.2) | 20.2 (−6.6) | 31.7 (−0.2) | 42.6 (5.9) | 53.2 (11.8) | 59.3 (15.2) | 58.7 (14.8) | 51.4 (10.8) | 41.2 (5.1) | 31.6 (−0.2) | 23.0 (−5.0) | 36.8 (2.7) |
| Record low °F (°C) | −27 (−33) | −35 (−37) | −19 (−28) | 0 (−18) | 20 (−7) | 31 (−1) | 36 (2) | 31 (−1) | 26 (−3) | 15 (−9) | −2 (−19) | −18 (−28) | −35 (−37) |
| Average precipitation inches (mm) | 2.40 (61) | 1.66 (42) | 1.94 (49) | 2.91 (74) | 3.07 (78) | 2.92 (74) | 2.53 (64) | 3.25 (83) | 3.55 (90) | 4.50 (114) | 3.04 (77) | 2.44 (62) | 34.21 (869) |
| Average snowfall inches (cm) | 39.3 (100) | 27.2 (69) | 12.2 (31) | 4.5 (11) | 0.1 (0.25) | 0.0 (0.0) | 0.0 (0.0) | 0.0 (0.0) | 0.0 (0.0) | 0.3 (0.76) | 9.4 (24) | 30.6 (78) | 123.6 (314) |
| Average precipitation days (≥ 0.01 in) | 18.2 | 13.9 | 10.8 | 11.8 | 12.3 | 10.6 | 10.1 | 10.5 | 12.2 | 16.7 | 16.8 | 17.3 | 161.2 |
| Average snowy days (≥ 0.1 in) | 14.4 | 11.3 | 5.4 | 1.9 | 0.1 | 0.0 | 0.0 | 0.0 | 0.0 | 0.3 | 4.7 | 12.3 | 50.4 |
Source: NOAA

== In popular culture ==
Petoskey and the surrounding area are notable in 20th-century U.S. literature as the setting of several of the Nick Adams stories written by Ernest Hemingway, who spent his childhood summers on nearby Walloon Lake. Certain events in Jeffrey Eugenides' 2002 novel Middlesex, are set in and around Petoskey. The movie, Beside Still Waters, directed by co-screenwriter Chris Lowell, was filmed in Petoskey in 2012.

Christopher Wright, an author from Topinabee, wrote his novel "Bestseller" in 2002 under the pen name Christopher Knight. Wright funded the movie project for his book to be filmed in Petoskey in 2013. Wright also wrote the children's series "Michigan Chillers" and the series "American Chillers" under the pen name Johnathan Rand.
