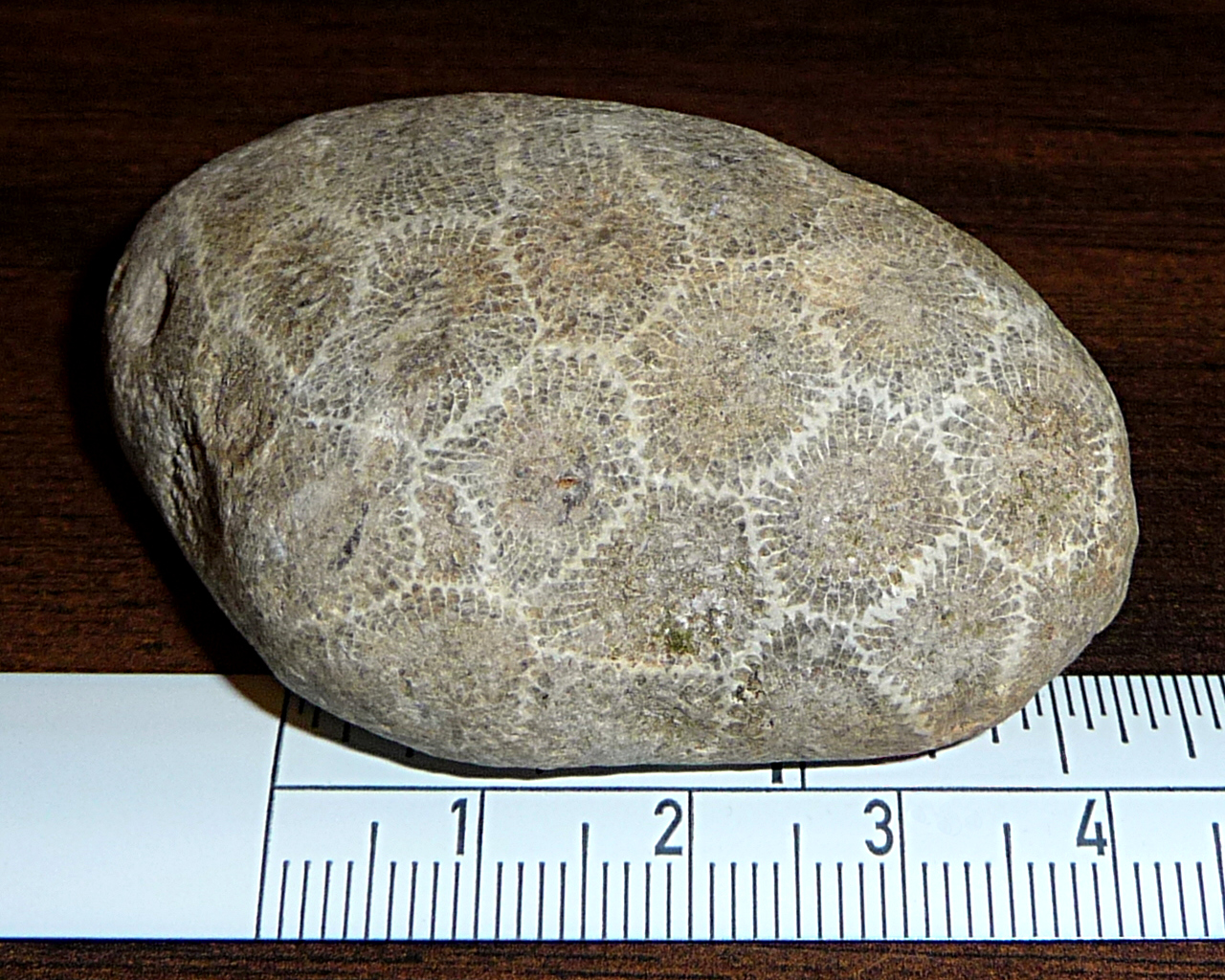
- Unpolished Petoskey stone with cm scale

Scientific classification
- Kingdom: Animalia
- Phylum: Cnidaria
- Subphylum: Anthozoa
- Class: †Rugosa
- Order: †Stauriida
- Family: †Disphyllidae
- Genus: †Hexagonaria
- Species: †H. percarinata

Binomial name
- †Hexagonaria percarinata Sloss 1939

= Petoskey stone =

Hexagonaria percarinata Temporal range: Givetian

Rock composed of fossilized coral

A Petoskey stone (/pəˈtɒski/ pə-TOSS-kee) is a collectible rock composed of the fossilized rugose coral, Hexagonaria percarinata. It is usually found pebble-shaped; such stones were formed as a result of glaciation, in which sheets of ice plucked the fossilized corals from the bedrock, ground off their rough edges and deposited them in the northwestern (and some in the northeastern) portion of Michigan's lower peninsula. In those same areas of Michigan, complete fossilized coral colony heads can be found in the source rocks for the Petoskey stones.

Petoskey stones are found in the Gravel Point Formation of the Traverse Group. They are fragments of a coral reef that was originally deposited during the Devonian period, approximately 350 million years ago. When dry, the stone resembles ordinary limestone but when wet or polished using lapidary techniques, it reveals the distinctive mottled pattern of the six-sided coral fossils. It is sometimes made into decorative objects, or even used as a gemstone. Other forms of fossilized coral are also found in the same location.

In 1965, it was named the state stone of Michigan.

== Etymology ==
The stone was named for a chief of the Ottawa people, Pet-O-Sega, son of a French fur trader and Ottawan mother. The city of Petoskey, Michigan, is also named after him, and is the center of the area where the stones are found. The stones are commonly found on beaches and in sand dunes.

According to legend, Petosegay was a descendant of French nobleman and fur trader Antoine Carre and a daughter of an Ottawa tribal chief. Petosegay, meaning "rising sun", "rays of dawn" or "sunbeams of promise", was named by his father after the rays of sun that fell upon his newborn face. Building on his father's start and his place among the Ottawa, Petosegay became a wealthy fur trader who also acquired much land in the region, gaining acclaim for himself and his band. He was said to have a striking and appealing appearance, and spoke both French and English very well. He married another Ottawa, and together they had two daughters and eight sons. In the summer of 1873, a few years before the chief's death, settlers began to develop a village on his land along Little Traverse Bay. The settlers named it Petoskey, an anglicized form of Petosegay.

== Locations ==
Petoskey stones can be found on various beaches and inland locations in Michigan, most commonly from Traverse City to Petoskey along Lake Michigan. The movement of the frozen lake ice acting on the shore during the winters is thought to turn over stones at the shore of Lake Michigan, exposing new Petoskey stones at the water's edge each spring. The type of coral that forms the basis of Petoskey Stones is also present in the fossil records of Iowa, Indiana, Illinois, Ohio, New York and locations in Canada, Germany, England, and Asia.

On 23 September 2015, it was reported that a 93-pound Petoskey stone was removed from the shallow waters of Lake Michigan, near the village of Northport, Michigan. In December 2015, the Michigan Department of Natural Resources confiscated the stone under a state law that disallows removing more than 25 pounds (11 kg) of materials from state lands. It was announced in October 2017 that the stone would be placed on permanent display at the Outdoor Adventure Center, east of downtown Detroit near the Detroit River.

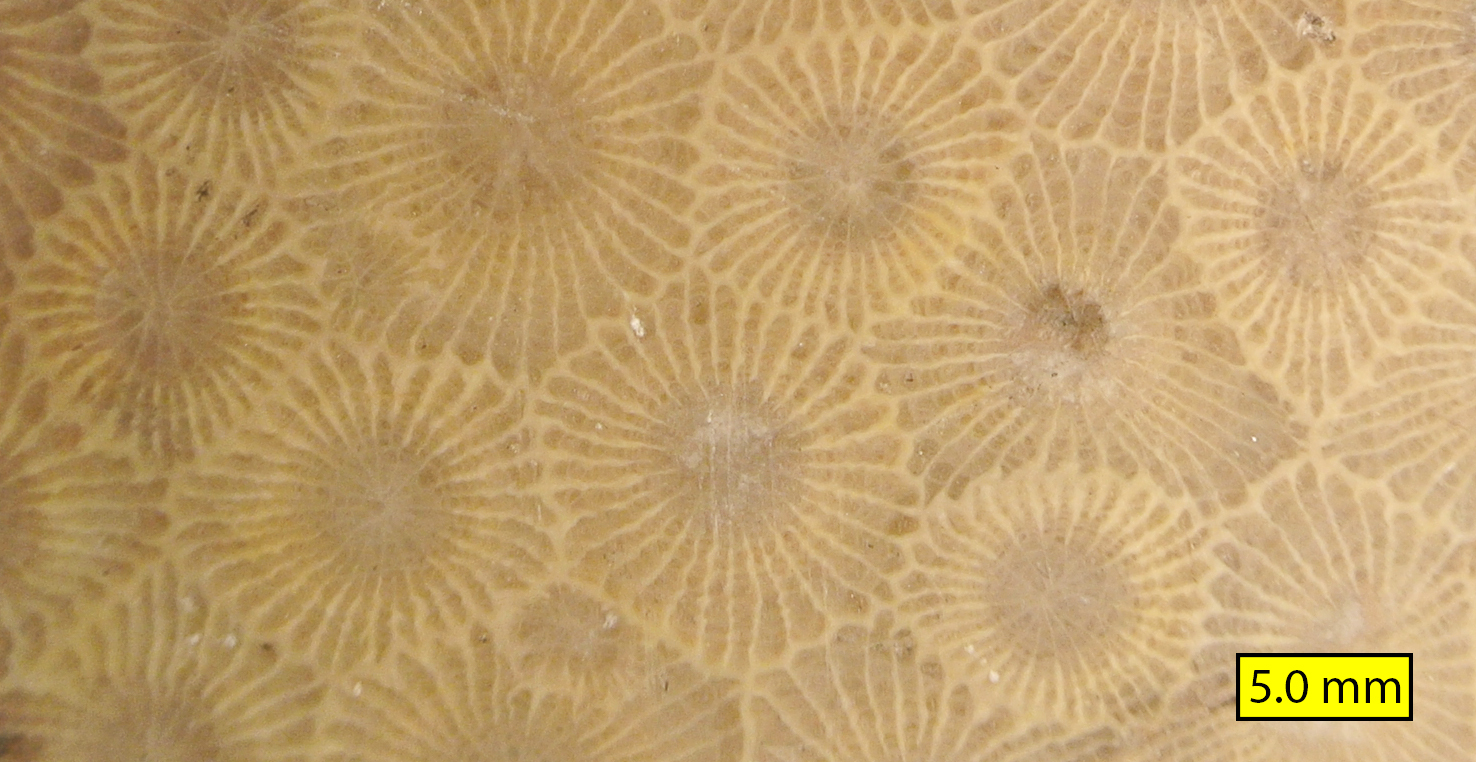
Close view of polished Hexagonaria percarinata from Michigan

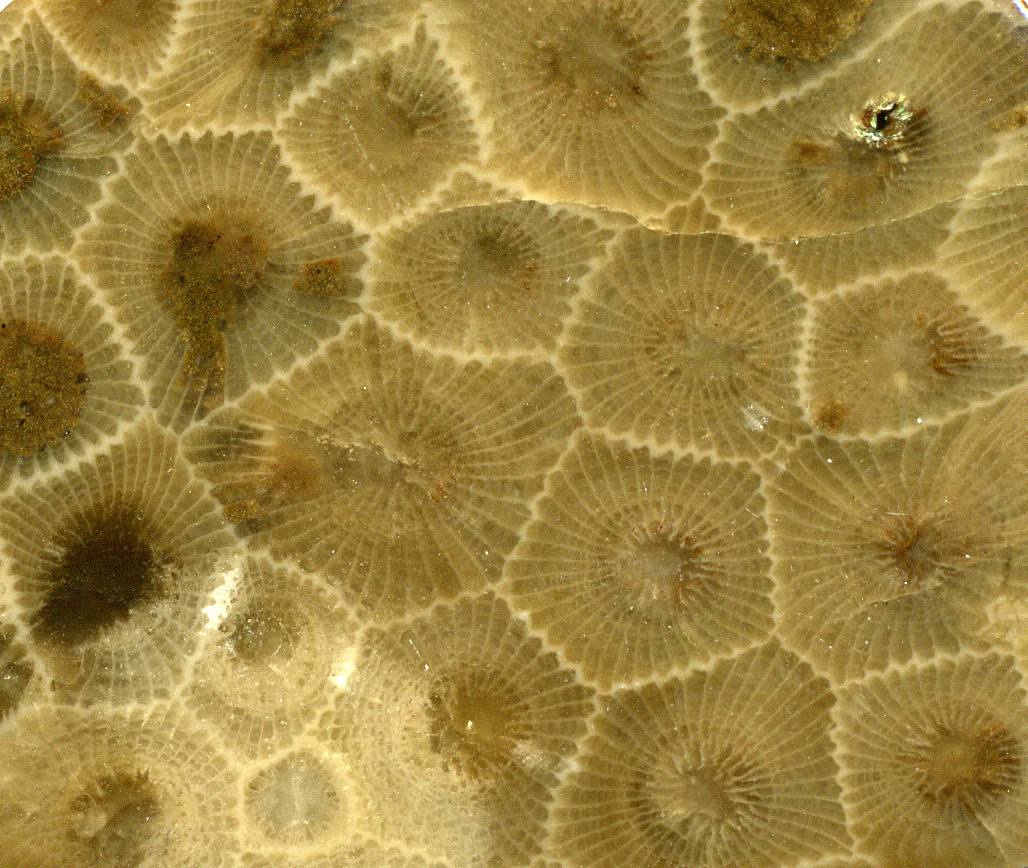
Closeup view, field of view ~3.6 cm wide

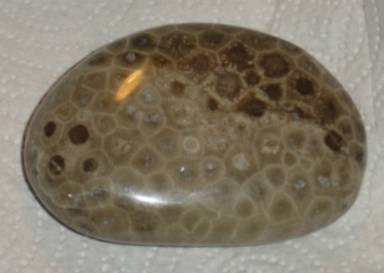
A polished Petoskey stone
