= Antoine Carre (explorer) =

French explorer and fur trader

Antoine Carre Neaatooshing
- Born: France
- Died: Petoskey, Michigan, United States
- Other name: Neaatooshing
- Occupations: Chieftain, fur trader
- Successor: Petosegay
- Children: Petosegay, son
- Relatives: Ignatius Petoskey, grandson Francis Petoskey, grandson Mitchell Petoskey, grandson

Antoine Carré (fl. 1786–1808) was a French explorer and fur trader. After marrying the daughter of an Odawa (Ottawa) chieftain, he became founder and leader of the Bear River Ottawa during the mid-18th century, when he was known in Odawa as Neaatooshing (or Nee-i-too-shing).

His son Chief Petosegay and grandson Ignatius Petoskey were prominent Odawa leaders throughout the 19th century. The land of the Bear River Ottawa was later developed by European Americans as the present-day town Petoskey, Michigan, and named for these leaders.

== Biography ==
A Frenchman reportedly of aristocratic origins, Carré arrived from France in the 1770s or early 1780s according to traditional accounts. While working as a fur trader for the American John Jacob Astor Fur Company, he explored much of northern Illinois and Michigan, living among the local tribes and learning their languages. He eventually married the daughter of an Odawa chief and was adopted by a family in the tribe. He was given the name Neaatooshing.

During the late 1780s, he founded his own band along the Bear River. His lodge was established about seven miles northwest of Harbor Springs, near Middle Village.

After spending the winter in what is now Chicago, he and members of his tribe were traveling north along the Kalamazoo River during the spring of 1787. His wife gave birth to their son near the mouth of the Manistee. According to local legend, Carré held the infant up to the rising sun and said "his name shall be Petosegay and he shall become an important person".

Carré was a representative and signatory for many of the treaties signed between the Odawa and the United States. Following his death, his son, Ignatius Petoskey succeeded him as chieftain and head of the Bear River Ottawa.
