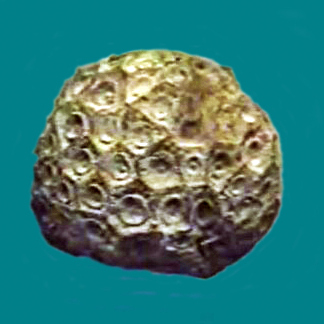
- Fossil of Acervularia ananas, on display at Natural History Museum, London

Scientific classification
- Domain: Eukaryota
- Kingdom: Animalia
- Phylum: Cnidaria
- Class: Hexacorallia
- Subclass: †Rugosa
- Order: †Stauriida
- Family: †Acervulariidae; Fromentel, 1861

= Acervulariidae =

Acervulariidae Temporal range: Ordovician–Devonian

Coral

Acervulariidae is an extinct family of horn coral. These stationary epifaunal suspension feeders lived during the Devonian, Silurian and Ordovician periods.

== Genera ==
Genera within this family include:

- Acervularia
- Diplophyllum
- Oliveria
- Rhapidophyllum

== Distribution ==
Fossils of species within this genus have been found in the Devonian of United States and in the Silurian of Canada, China, Norway, Russia, Sweden, Ukraine, United Kingdom and United States.
