= Petosegay =

Odawa leader

- Biidaasige
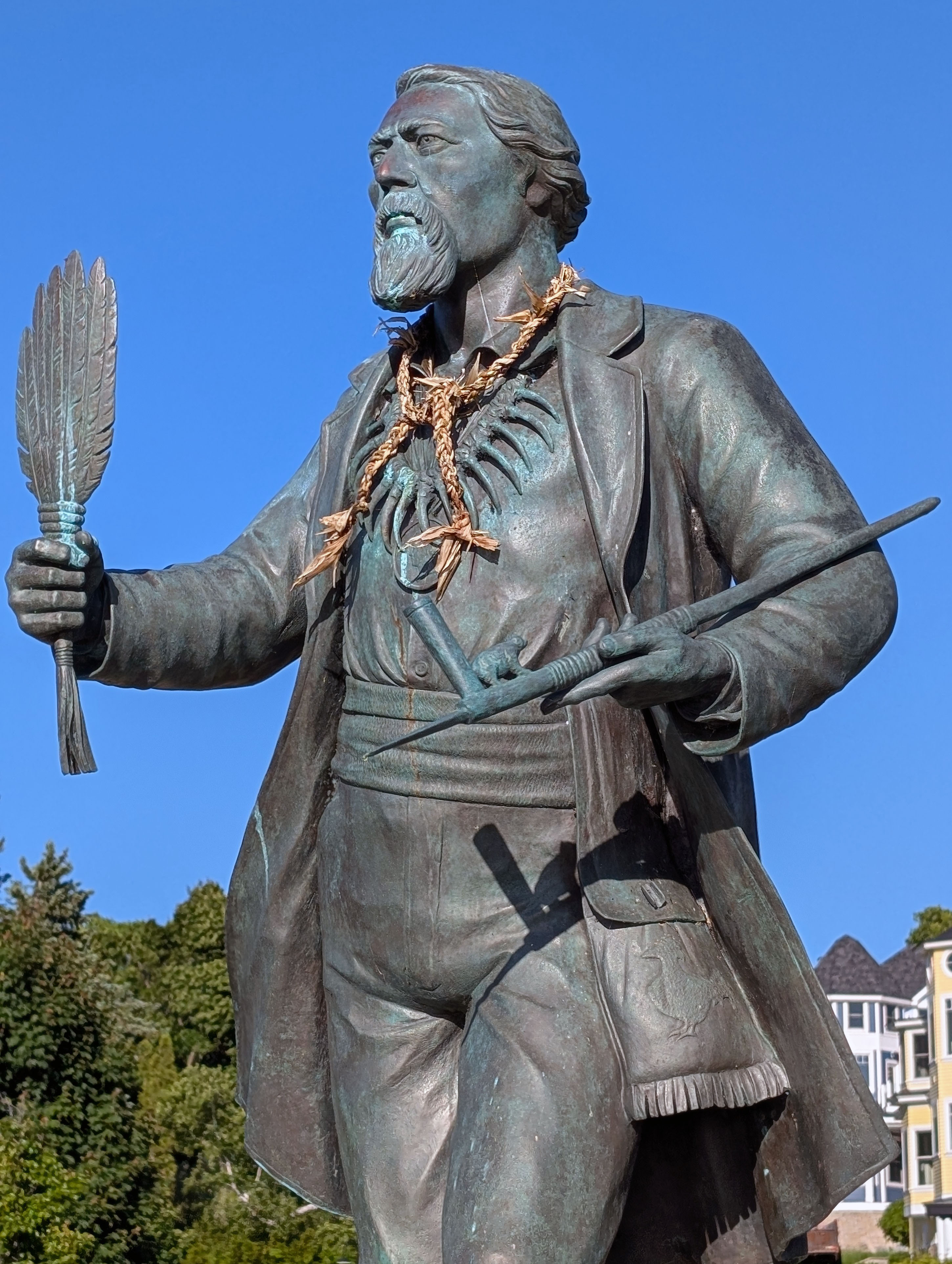
- Ignatius Petoskey by Pietro P. Vinotti in Petoskey, Michigan
- Born: Neyas Petosega (Rising Sun), later Ignatius Petoskey c. 1787; Near the Manistee River, Michigan
- Died: June 15, 1885 (aged 97-98); Petoskey, Michigan, United States
- Other names: Petosegay, Pet-O-Sega
- Occupations: Headman, fur trader
- Predecessor: Neaatooshing
- Successor: Ignatius Petoskey
- Spouse(s): Kewaykabawikwa, wife
- Children: Francis Petoskey, son Mitchell Petoskey, son Enos Petoskey, son
- Parent(s): Antoine Carre (Neaatooshing), father Unnamed Ottawa, mother
- Relatives: Poka-9zeegun, father-in-law William Petoskey, grandson Paul Petoskey, grandson

Petosegay or Biidaasige (Ottawa: Light that is Coming) (c. 1787 – June 15, 1885) was a 19th-century Odawa merchant and fur trader. Both present-day Petoskey, Michigan, Petoskey State Park, and nearby Emmet County park Camp Petosega are named in his honor. A particular variety of stone was found in abundance on his former lands and named after him, and the Petoskey stone was designated as the official state stone. His granddaughter, Ella Jane Petoskey, was asked by Michigan Governor George W. Romney to be an honored signatory on the bill assigning the Petoskey Stone as the state stone.

== Biography ==
=== Early life ===
The son of the French explorer and fur trader Antoine Carre (Neaatooshing) and his wife, daughter of an Odawa chief, Biidaasige was born along the northern banks of the Manistee River. According to popular lore, his father held him up to the rising sun and said "His name shall be Biidaasige, 'Light that is Coming,' and he shall become an important person".

He grew up in the lodge of his parents, roughly seven miles northwest of Harbor Springs, near the site of the town of Middle Village. At the age of 21, Biidaasige married Kewaykabawikwa, the daughter of Pokozeegun, an Ottawa chieftain from the northern Lower Peninsula of Michigan. He and his new bride planted apple trees to celebrate their marriage. Many trees survived for decades after Biidaasige's death, when they could still be seen by local residents.

=== Experiences with the Jesuits ===
With the arrival of Jesuit Catholic missionaries in the area during the early 19th century, Biidaasige was befriended by the new men, who would attempt to convert him to Catholicism. He was called Neyas Petosega by the Jesuits, who later interpreted Neyas as an abbreviation of Ignatius, the given name of Saint Ignatius Loyola. He was assigned the name Ignatius Petosega by the Jesuit order.

During the 1840s, when the US government began establishing the first Indian schools for the purposes of re-educating and indoctrinating Native American children, Biidaasige sent his two oldest sons to Twinsburg Institute in Twinsburg, Ohio. It was also attended by Native Americans Andrew Jackson Blackbird and Simon Pokagon, who later became writers. However, when the Jesuits learned that this school was operated by Protestants, they asked Biidaasige to withdraw his sons, under threat of excommunication, which he refused. Biidaasige broke all contact with the Jesuits and his wife left him due to her commitment to the Catholic church.

=== Founding of Petoskey and later years ===
Biidaasige moved his family to the southern shore of Little Traverse Bay, where Biidaasige and his elder sons soon acquired land, much of which is now Petoskey, Michigan, from the federal government. Michigan had not yet gained legal status as a state. Biidaasige thought by purchasing this land he could provide a refuge for people who wanted to maintain their tribal existence without foreign interference. Biidaasige thought he would have the same relationship with the federal government as those on the reservation, called Waganakising (crooked tree). He expanded trading to become a prominent merchant and landowner. What is not mentioned in this history is there was a village called Bear River near the Bear River, and an Odawa band present called The Bear River Band of Odawak. In addition, Chief Biidaasige was a combatant in the War of 1812, supporting Tecumseh's effort to force the removal of all foreign influences.

When Michigan became a state in 1837, the federal government did not acknowledge any relationship with Chief Biidaasige or his purchase of 440 acres, which included most of the downtown area of present-day Petoskey. The state offered the 440 acres for sale, and a Presbyterian minister came with a deed to several of the 440 acres. Shortly afterwards, other non-Odawa settlers came with deeds to other portions of the land. The band had already been threatened by their removal and relocation to Kansas, and Chief Petoskey knew that if he encouraged any resistance they would be removed.

In 1852, a Presbyterian Mission was established on the land of Nathan Jarman, a local farmer living west of Petoskey's village. Choosing to declare further independence from the Jesuits, Biidaasige became actively involved with the Presbyterians, and he and his children became regular attendees at the services. His grandson William Petoskey, the son of Francis, later became a Presbyterian minister.

The Jesuits, who had lost some support from the local tribes south of the Bay, attempted to regain control, although their efforts to establish a rival mission failed as a direct result of Biidaasige's support of the Presbyterian church. His wife Kebaykawawikwa, upset at her husband's decision to leave their home of 43 years, left him to live with her relatives across the bay. He lived with another woman during this time, but he agreed to take back Kebaykabawikwa when she returned several years later. Biidaasige gave the second woman a dower, and she left the village.

In 1873, residents along the bay of Bear Creek named their settlement Petoskey in Biidaasige's honor, although the name was a corruption of Biidaasige. After his wife died in 1881, he lived with his daughter and her husband Moses Waukazoo. Suffering poor health, he died on June 27, 1885. Of his ten children, his son Ignatius Petoskey was rumored to have been the last chief and head of the Bear River Band of Odawa. This was a non-tribal viewpoint that tribal members found amusing because it was untrue. Biidaasige's descendants still live in the area.

A type of fossil colonial coral, dating back to the Devonian period, was later discovered on his land and named after him as the Petoskey stone. This was later declared the official state stone by Governor George Romney, who officially signed a bill to that effect. A granddaughter, Ella Jane Petoskey, was present at the signing.

In 2005 a bronze statue of Biidaasige was erected in Petoskey on a prominent hill overlooking the town and Little Traverse Bay.
