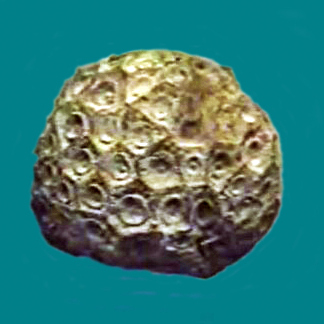
- Fossil of Acervularia ananas, on display at Natural History Museum, London

Scientific classification
- Kingdom: Animalia
- Phylum: Cnidaria
- Subphylum: Anthozoa
- Class: †Rugosa
- Order: †Stauriida
- Family: †Acervulariidae
- Genus: †Acervularia; Schweigger, 1819

Synonyms
- Arachnium Keyserling 1846; Cyathogonium Chapman 1893; Favastrea Blainville 1834; Floscularia Eichwald 1829; Rhabdophyllum Wedekind 1927

= Acervularia =

Acervularia Temporal range: Silurian–Devonian

Extinct genus of corals

Acervularia is an extinct genus of horn coral. These stationary epifaunal suspension feeders lived during the Silurian (Wenlock and Ludlow ages) and Devonian periods.

== Distribution ==
Fossils of species within this genus have been found in the Devonian of United States and in the Silurian of Canada, Norway, Sweden, Ukraine and United Kingdom.
