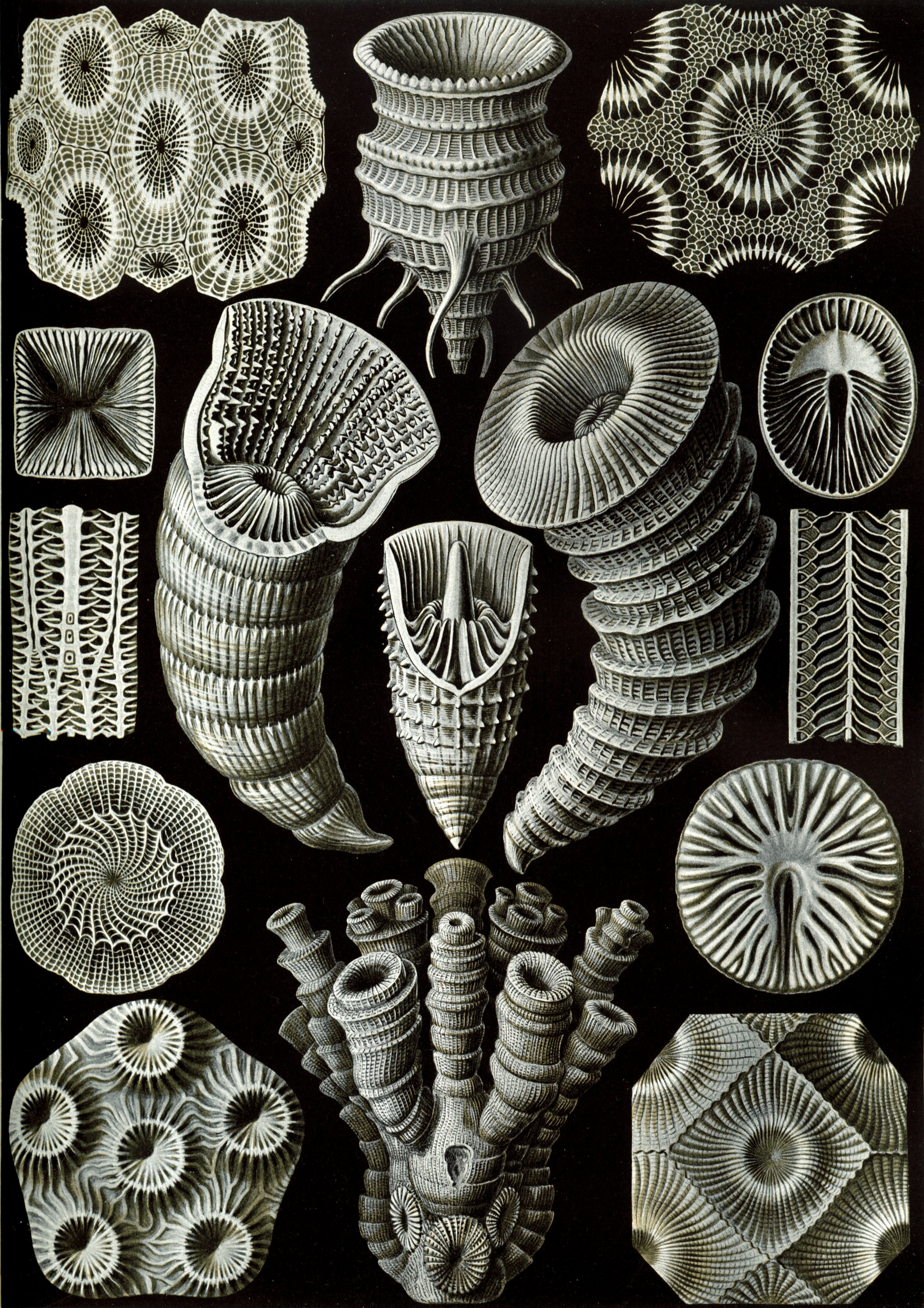
- "Tetracorallia" from Ernst Haeckel's Kunstformen der Natur, 1904

Scientific classification
- Kingdom: Animalia
- Phylum: Cnidaria
- Subphylum: Anthozoa
- Class: †Rugosa; Milne-Edwards & Haime, 1850

Orders
- †Cystiphyllida; †Stauriida

Synonyms
- Tetracorallia Haeckel, 1866; Pterocorallia Frech, 1890

= Rugosa =

Rugosa Temporal range: Ordovician–Permian

Extinct class of corals

The Rugosa (rugose corals) are an extinct class of solitary or colonial corals that were abundant in Middle Ordovician to Late Permian seas.

Solitary rugosans (e.g., Caninia, Lophophyllidium, Neozaphrentis, Streptelasma) are often referred to as horn corals because of their unique horn-shaped skeleton with a wrinkled, or rugose, wall. Some solitary rugosans reached nearly a meter (3 ft 3 in) in length. However, some species of rugose corals could form large colonies (e.g., Lithostrotion).

Rugose corals are known from their fossilized skeleton, made of calcite. Like modern corals (Scleractinia), rugose corals were invariably benthic, living on the sea floor or in a reef-framework. Some symbiotic rugose corals were endobionts of Stromatoporoidea (a type of extinct reef-building sponge), especially in the Silurian period. As with other cnidarians, it is presumed that these Palaeozoic corals possessed tentacles with stinging cells to capture prey. Technically they were carnivores, but prey-size was so small they are often referred to as microcarnivores.

When radiating septa were present, they were usually in multiples of four, so rugose corals were historically known as Tetracorallia in contrast to modern Hexacorallia, where the colonial polyps generally have sixfold symmetry.

== Morphology ==
Each polyp of a rugose coral is hosted on a corallite, the fundamental skeletal structure of the coral. Unlike most living corals, many rugosan species live a solitary life, with a relatively large polyp (and corresponding corallite) surviving on its own. These horn-shaped solitary species develop from a pointed tip (apex) up towards the polyp-bearing cup (calice). Other rugosan species have polyps which grow together as a colony, with the entire colony's skeleton known as a corallum. The Petoskey stone, the state stone of Michigan, is actually a corallum of the colonial rugose coral Hexagonaria.

=== Septa ===
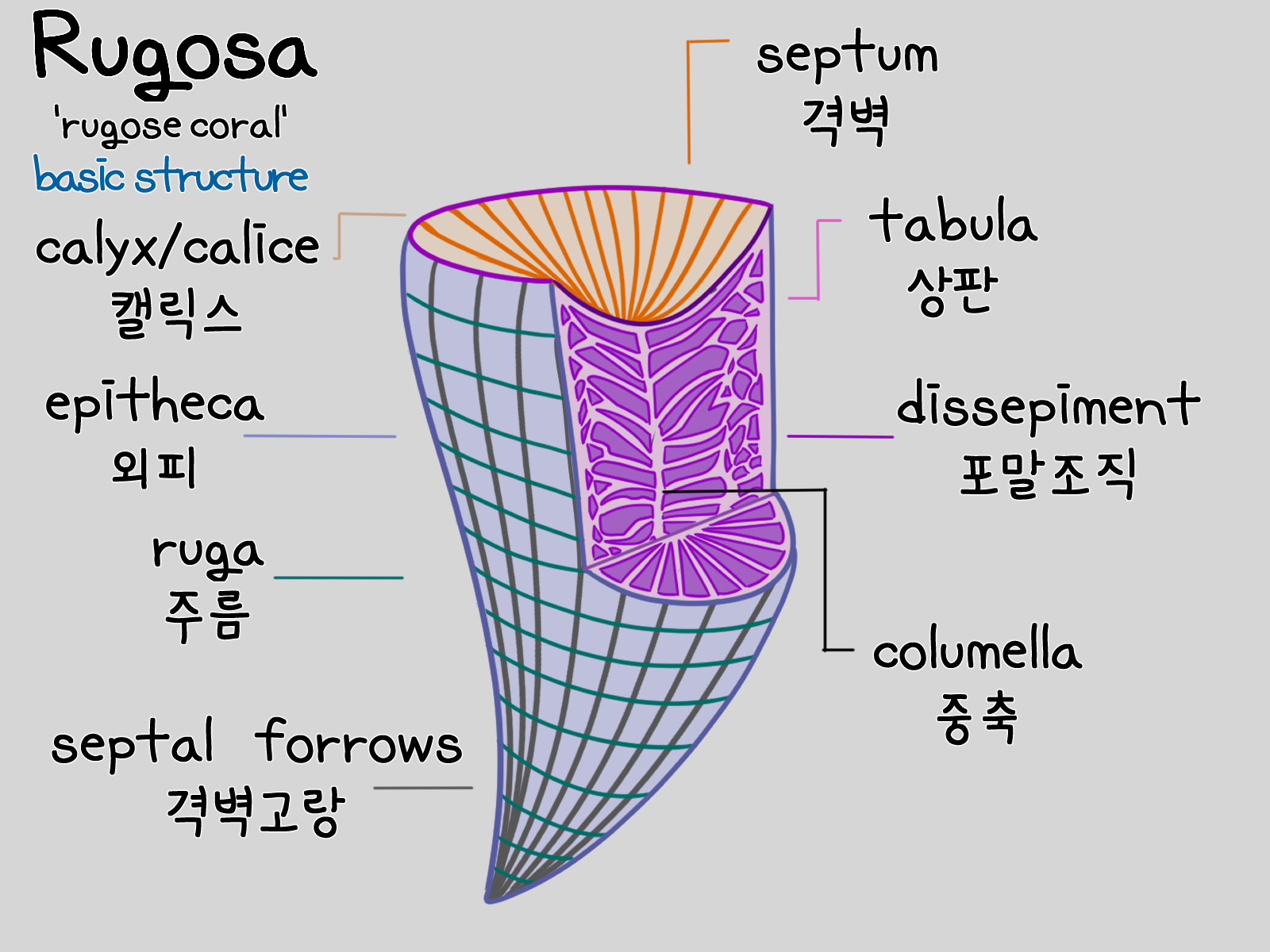
Diagram showing major anatomical features of a rugose coral corallite.

Rugosans are most easily identifiable by their prominent septa (singular: septum), plates which run up the longitudinal axis of the corallite and are directed inward to form a radial (spoke-shaped) pattern in transverse cross-section. A fine level of magnification will reveal that each septum is actually a series of crystalline tubes (trabeculae) with bristle-like calcite fibers.

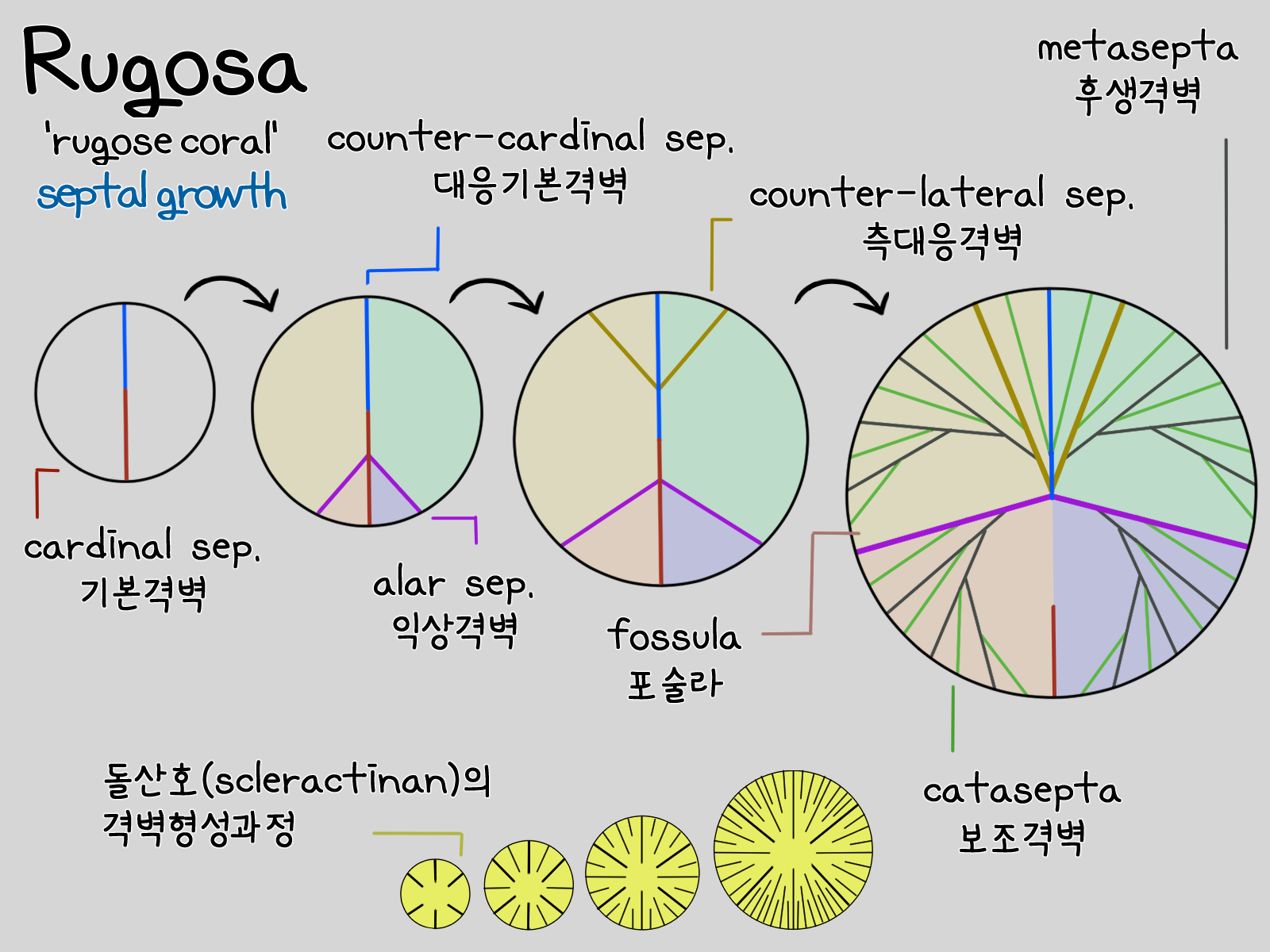
A cross-section through a rugosan at various ages, showing stages in the development of septa

Rugose corals have a unique arrangement of septa which preserves bilateral symmetry, unlike the fully radial symmetry of tabulate and modern scleractinian corals. The first septum to develop is the cardinal septum, marked by a furrow known as the fossula. Next, the counter septum develops on the opposite end of the rim. The straight symmetrical axis between the cardinal and counter septum is bilateral in basic form even if the rest of the coral shows radial symmetry.

Following those first two septa are a pair of widely-spaced alar septa (in the cardinal septum's half of the corallite) and a pair of more narrowly-spaced counter-lateral septa (in the counter septum's half). Finally, many more major and minor septa arise in the vicinity of the alar and counter-lateral septa, filling in the rest of the corallite.

=== Tabulae and dissepiments ===
Rugose corals also show tabulae (singular: tabula), horizontal plates that slice through the corallite skeleton in a top-to-bottom series. Tabulae tend to be concentrated near the center of the corallite in a region known as the tabularium. Rugose corals almost always have dissepiments: curved, overlapping plates interlinking between the various septa and tabulae. Dissepiments are concentrated near the wall of the corallite in a mesh-like region known as the marginarium or dissepimentarium.

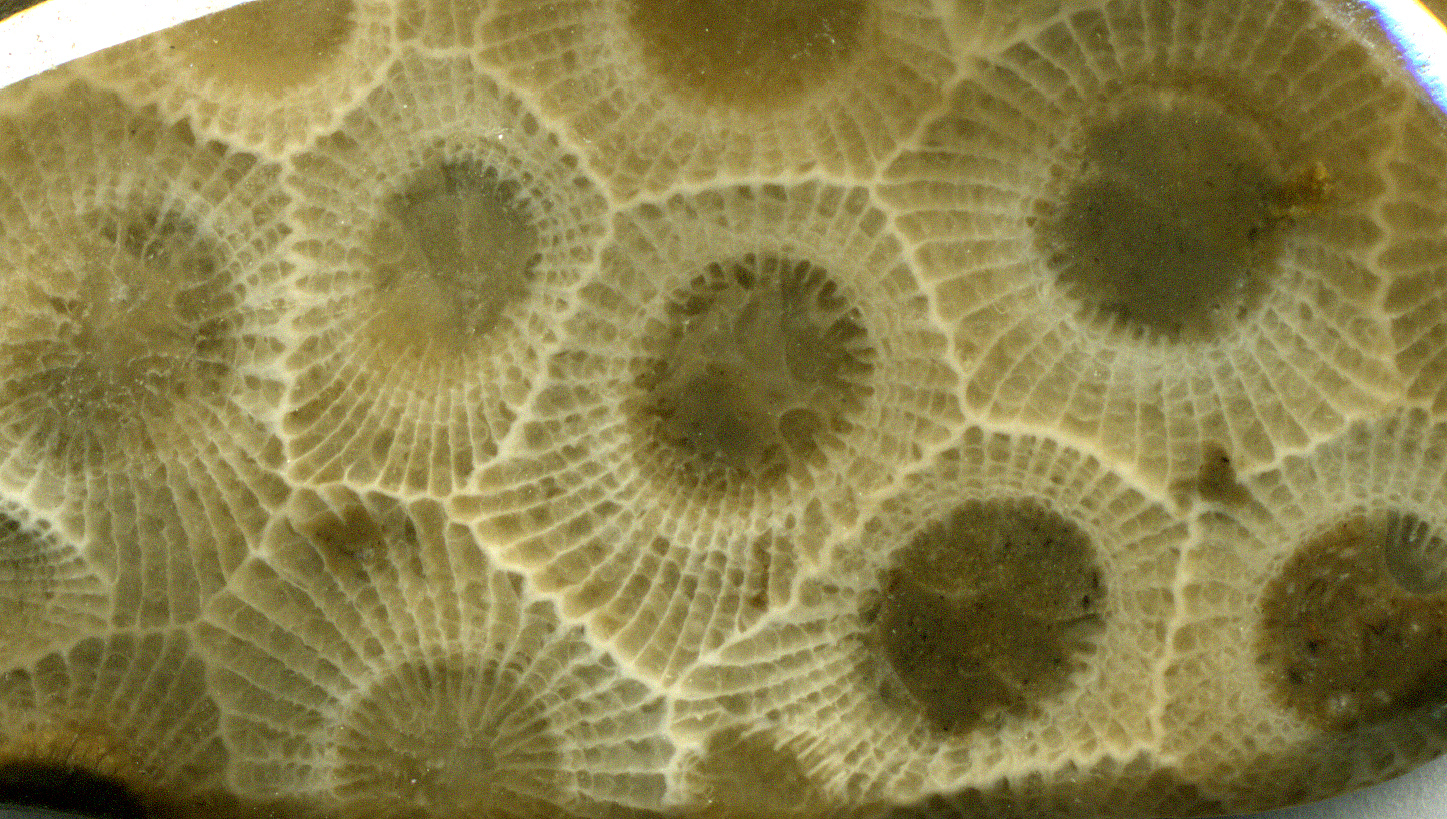
A close view of a Petoskey stone. Actually the colonial rugose coral Hexagonaria, a columnariine from Middle Devonian Michigan.

Many shallow-water solitary rugosans have a dense marginarium which may help protect the coral against waves. In some rugosans, the dissepiments and/or the bases of the septa are so densely packed that the outer region of the corallite is a solid layer known as the stereozone. On the other hand, colonial rugosans living in turbid waters tend to have reduced septa and no distinct boundary between individual corallites, relying on a broad, low-density marginarium to spread out the coral's weight akin to a snowshoe.

=== Axial structures ===
Rugose corals often have a columella, a dense rod running up the center (axis) of the corallite. It is common in rugose corals because they were mainly solitary, and so required the extra support. Tabulate corals have no columella because they were always colonial and relied on the support of neighboring corallites. Alternatively, the center of the corallite may be supported by the aulos, a tube filled with tabulae.

=== Epitheca ===
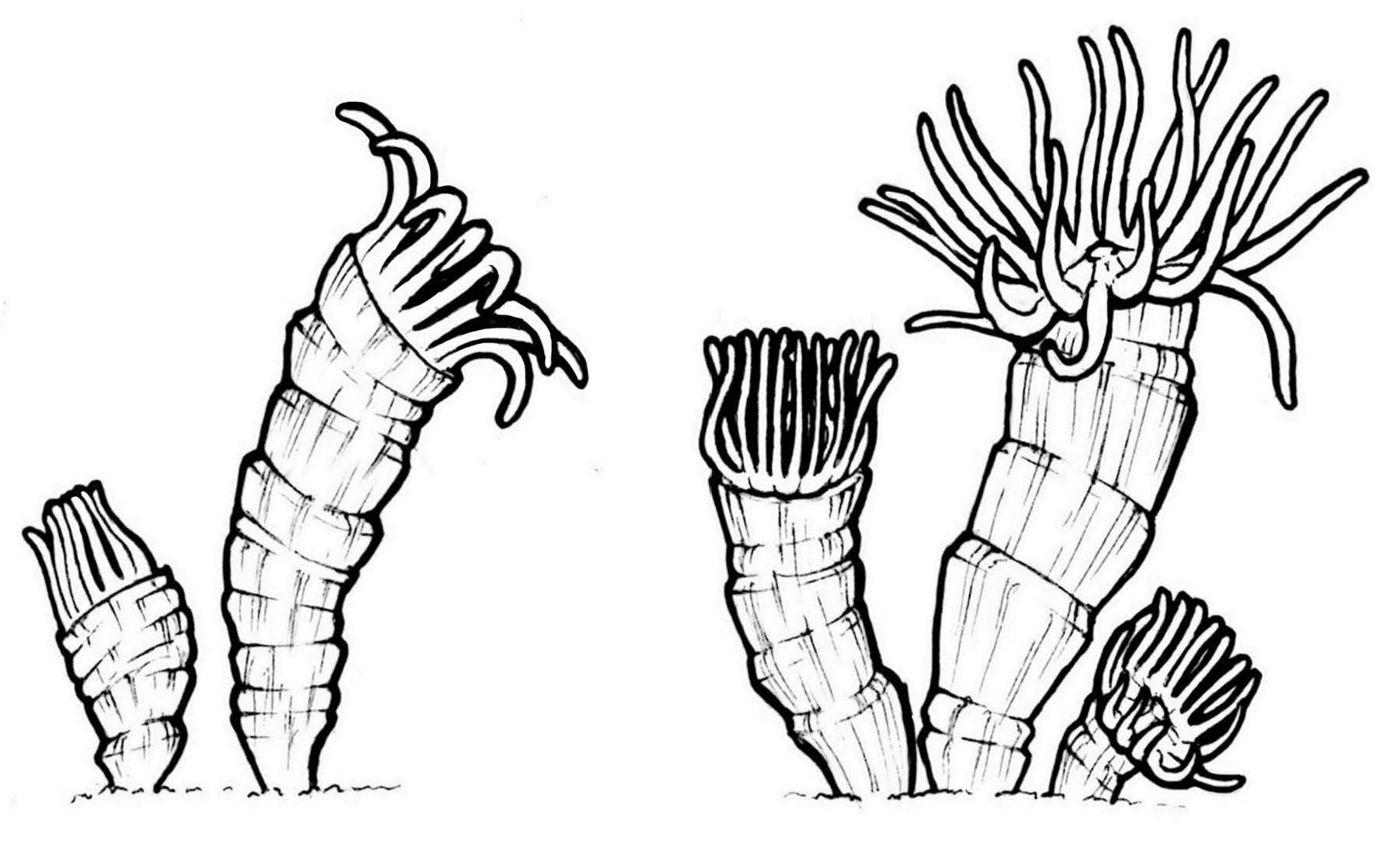
Life restoration of Barytichisma

The epitheca (exterior layer of the corallite) is roughly textured, with concentric growth rings (rugae) as well as longitudinal ridges (costae) and furrows. The costae tend to line up precisely with the internal septa. There are multiple orders of growth rings, with the thinnest developing daily and the thickest developing yearly. By counting the ratio of daily to yearly rings in rugosan fossils, paleontologist John W. Wells determined that there were over 400 days per year in the Middle Devonian, with each day shorter than a modern 24-hour day.

=== Colony forms ===
Colonial rugose corals can show many different growth forms in their corallum (entire colony structure):

- Fasciculate corals have their corallites joined at the base, but the edge of each corallite is not connected, leaving a gap of open water between each.
  - Dendroid corals have a branching bush-like system of corallites.
  - Phaceloid corals have corallites running in parallel from a common base. Some phaceloid corals have outgrowths bridging between the gaps.
- Massive corals have no gaps between their corallites.
  - Cerioid corals retain walls between adjacent corallites. Petoskey stones (Hexagonaria) are an example of cerioid corals.
  - Astreoid corals have no walls between adjacent corallites, but each corallite retains its own set of septa which contact the septa of adjacent corallites.
  - Thamnasteroid corals have no walls, and septa are shared equally between adjacent corallites.
  - Aphroid corals have no walls, and septa are completely isolated from each other within a colony-wide mesh of dissepiments.

== Taxonomy ==
Taxonomy to the suborder level, mostly based on Treatise on Invertebrate Paleontology (Part F, 1981) and Scrutton (1997):

- Order Cystiphyllida (Suborder Cystiphyllina) Nicholson, 1889 (Middle Ordovician – Middle Devonian)
- Order Stauriida Verrill, 1865 (Middle Ordovician – Late Permian)
  - Suborder Arachnophyllina Zhavoronkova, 1972 (Silurian – Middle Devonian)
  - Suborder Aulophyllina Hill, 1981 (Late Devonian – Middle Permian)
  - Suborder Calostylina Prant, 1957 (Middle Ordovician – Early Devonian)
  - Suborder Caniniina Wang, 1950 (Mississippian – Late Permian)
  - Suborder Columnariina Rominger, 1876 (Silurian – Late Devonian)
  - Suborder Cyathophyllina Nicholson, 1889 (Silurian – Mississippian)
  - Suborder Diffingiina Fedorowski, 1985 (Early Permian – Middle Permian)
  - Suborder Ketophyllina Zhavoronkova, 1972 (Late Ordovician – Late Devonian)
  - Suborder Lithostrotionina Spasskiy & Kachanov, 1971 (Mississippian – Late Permian)
  - Suborder Lonsdaleiina Spasskiy, 1974 (Mississippian – Late Permian)
  - Suborder Lycophyllina Zhavoronkova, 1972 (Late Ordovician – Middle Devonian)
  - Suborder Metriophyllina Spasskiy, 1965 (Middle Ordovician – Late Permian)
  - Suborder Plerophyllina Sokolov, 1960 (Late Silurian – Late Permian)
  - Suborder Ptenophyllina Wedekind, 1927 (Silurian – Late Devonian)
  - Suborder Stauriina Verrill, 1865 (Middle Ordovician – Mississippian)
  - Suborder Stereolasmatina Hill, 1981 (Early Devonian – Late Permian)
  - Suborder Streptelasmatina Wedekind, 1927 (Middle Ordovician – Late Devonian)
  - Suborder Tachylasmatina Fedorowski, 1973 (Early Devonian – Late Permian)

== Evolutionary history ==
=== Ordovician ===
Rugosans likely originated from a non-skeletal anthozoan similar to modern sea anemones. The oldest rugosan fossils appear near the end of the Middle Ordovician, during the transition from the Darriwilian stage to the Sandbian stage at the start of the Late Ordovician. Lambelasma, a calostyline from Darriwilian-age Iran, is the earliest confirmed example. By the end of the Sandbian stage, rugose corals were common in the shallow seas of North America and Baltoscandia. Five rugosan suborders filled out the reef-building faunas of the Late Ordovician: Cystiphyllina, Calostylina, Stauriina, Streptelasmatina, and Metriophyllina. Cystiphyllines, streptelasmatines, and metriophyllines were usually solitary, stauriines were colonial, and calostylines included many species of both solitary and colonial corals.

Some early rugosans were very simple, such as Primitophyllum (a cystiphylline) and Lambeophyllum (a calostyline). These simple forms resembled tiny cones with rudimentary septa and no tabulae, and they may be a good estimate for an ancestral rugosan. Others were more typical, such as the solitary Streptelasma (a streptelasmatine) and colonial Favistina (a stauriine).

=== Silurian ===
The Ordovician suborders all persisted into the Silurian, though newer groups achieved even greater abundance. The Arachnophyllina, Ketophyllina, and Lycophyllina diversify quickly, while others (the Columnariina, Cyathophyllina, and Ptenophyllina) slowly take hold. Calostylines diminish and go extinct near the Silurian-Devonian boundary. Lycophyllines were usually solitary, while arachnophyllines, columnariines, and ptenophyllines were usually colonial. Cyathophyllines and ketophyllines included many solitary and colonial species.

=== Devonian ===
The Early Devonian was the apex of diversity for rugosans and many other marine animals. The Middle to Late Devonian, however, saw a series of extinction events which profoundly reshaped rugosan faunas. Arachnophyllines, cystiphyllines, lycophyllines, and streptelasmatines all die out near the start of the Late Devonian. Others (ketophyllines, columnariines, and ptenophyllines) last longer, though they too would vanish by the end of the period. However, the Devonian was also the origin of a few more rugosan suborders: Plerophyllina and Stereolasmatina, both of which were small and solitary.

=== Carboniferous–Permian ===
Rugosans recovered from extinction quickly in the Mississippian (early Carboniferous). Plerophyllines and stereolasmatines lead the charge, alongside a substantial diversification of four new suborders: Aulophyllina, Caniniina, Lithostrotionina, and Lonsdaleiina. Aulophyllines and caniniines were usually large and solitary, while lithostrotionines and lonsdaleiines were usually colonial.

An extinction at the end of the Mississippian eliminated the last stauriines and cyathophyllines, while the other suborders survived at a slightly reduced capacity through the Pennsylvanian (late Carboniferous). Rugosans experienced a few small extinctions within the Permian period, but on the whole they were still abundant reef builders until the entire class died out in the Permian–Triassic extinction event.

== Gallery ==
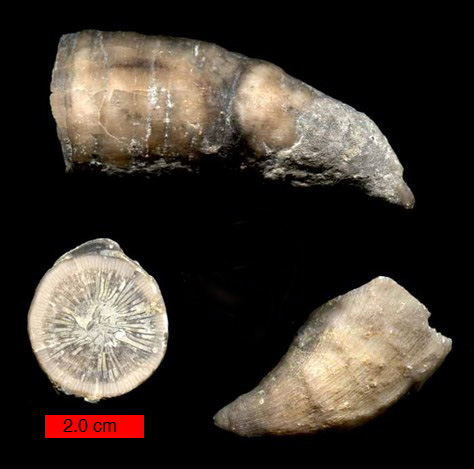
Three views of Grewingkia canadensis, a solitary streptelasmatine from Ordovician Indiana

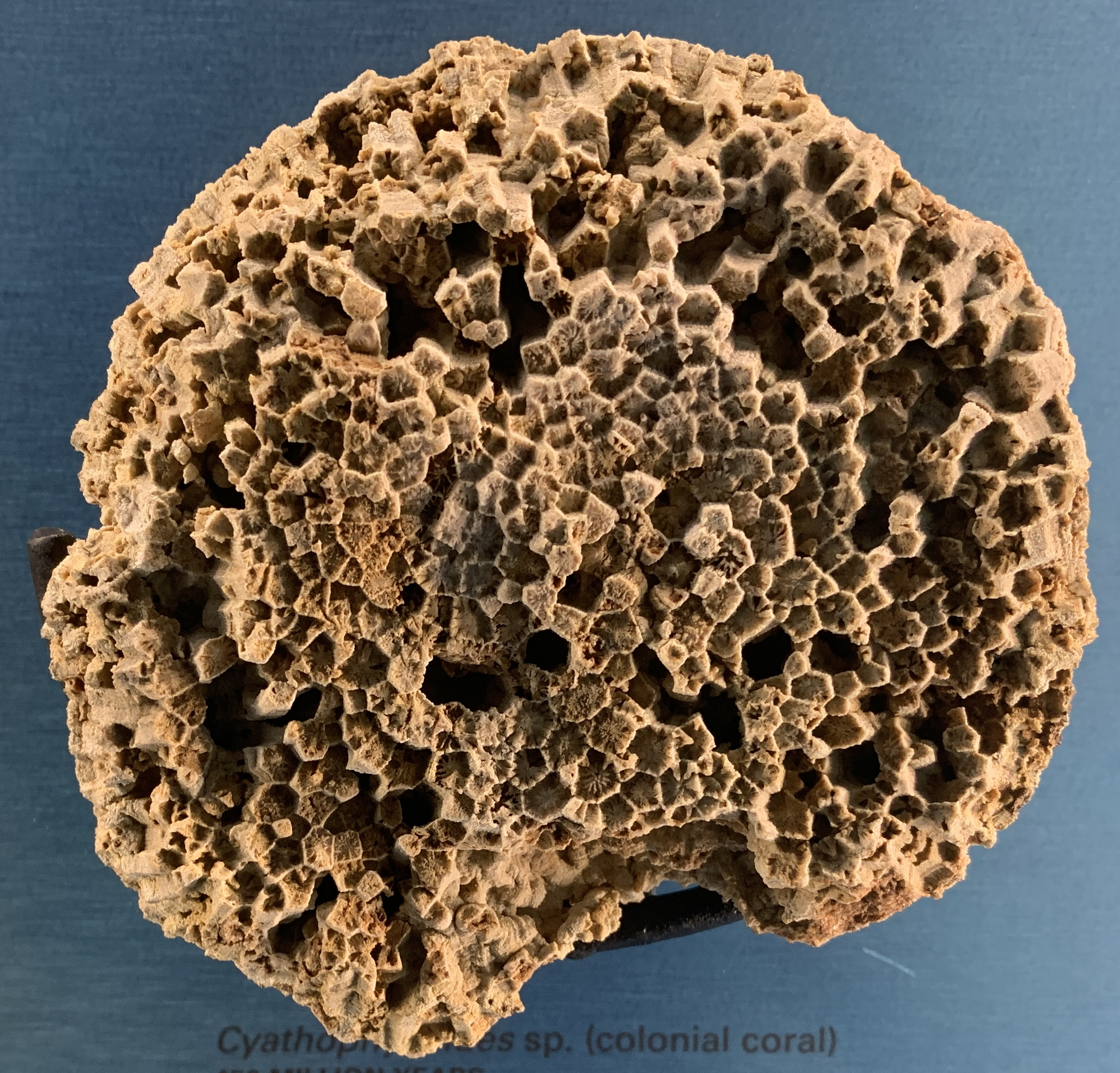
Cyathophylloides sp., a colonial stauriine from the Late Ordovician, Georgian Bay Formation, Ontario, Canada

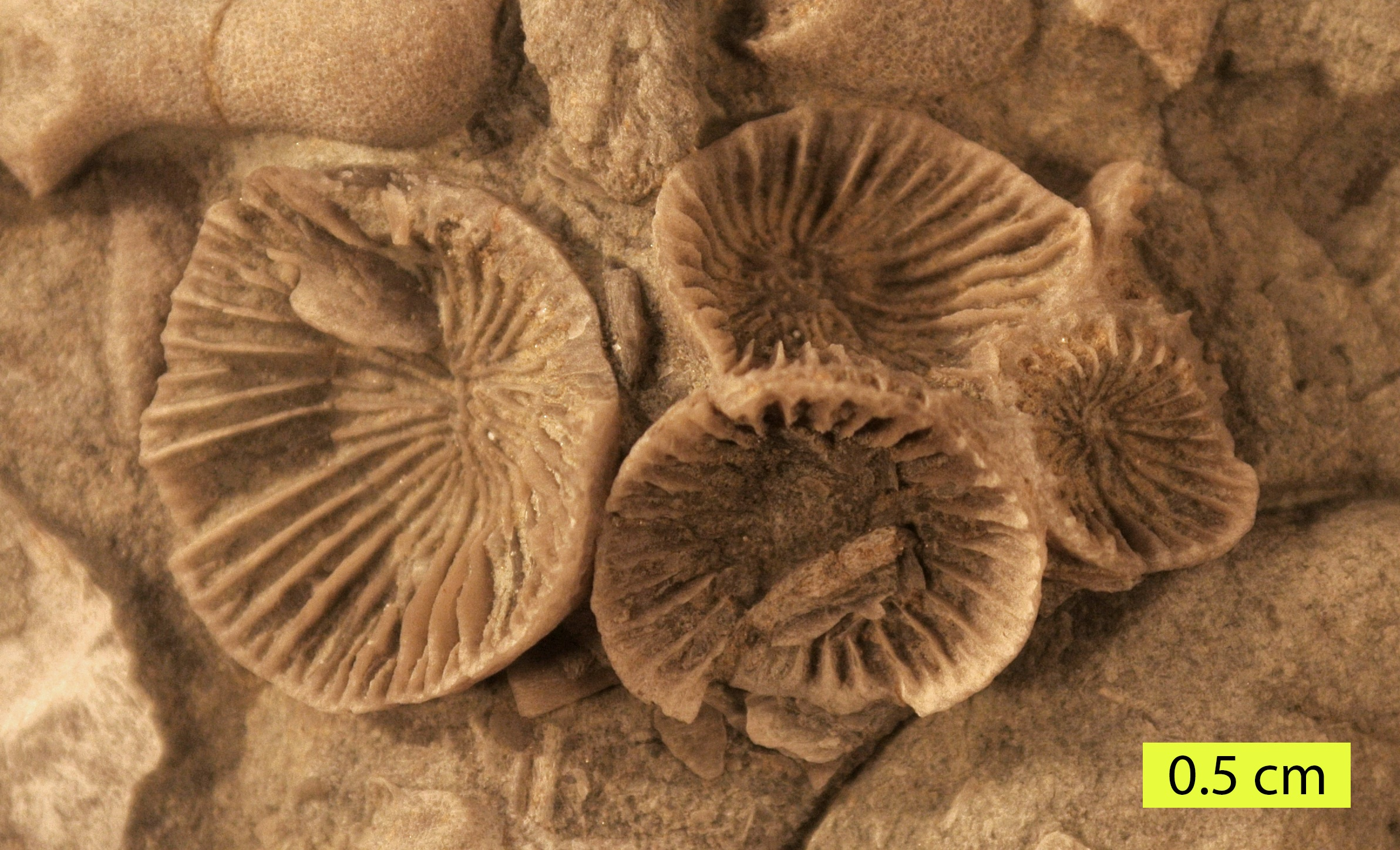
Streptelasma divaricans (Nicholson, 1875), a solitary streptelasmatine from the Liberty Formation (Late Ordovician) of southern Ohio

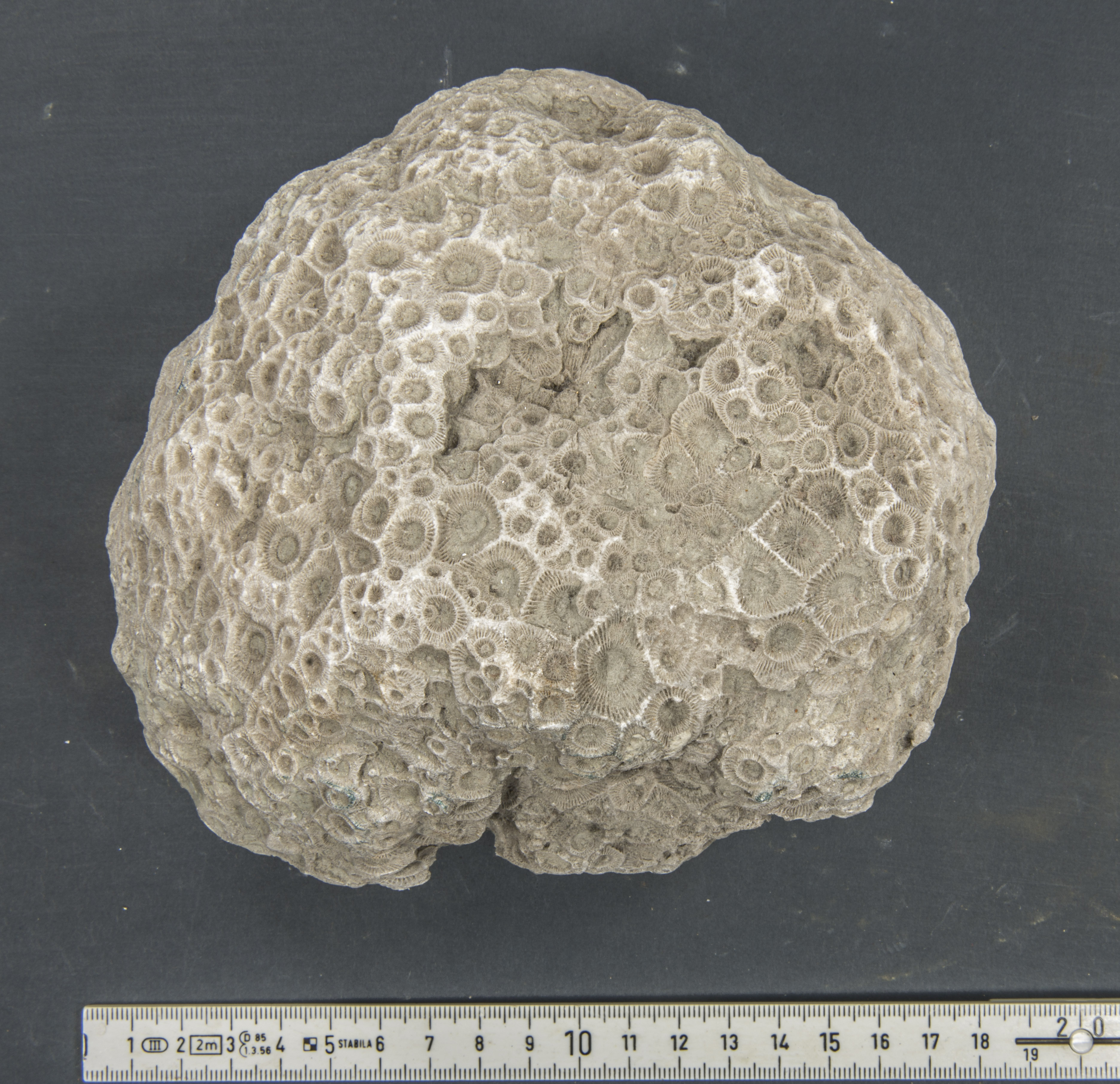
Acervularia, a colonial columnariine from Silurian Sweden

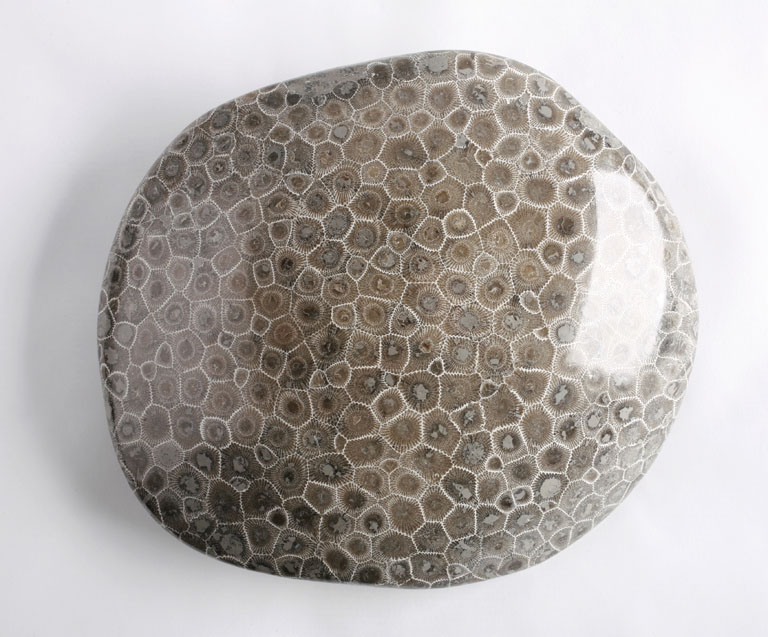
A polished Petoskey stone (Hexagonaria, a colonial columnariine from Devonian Michigan)

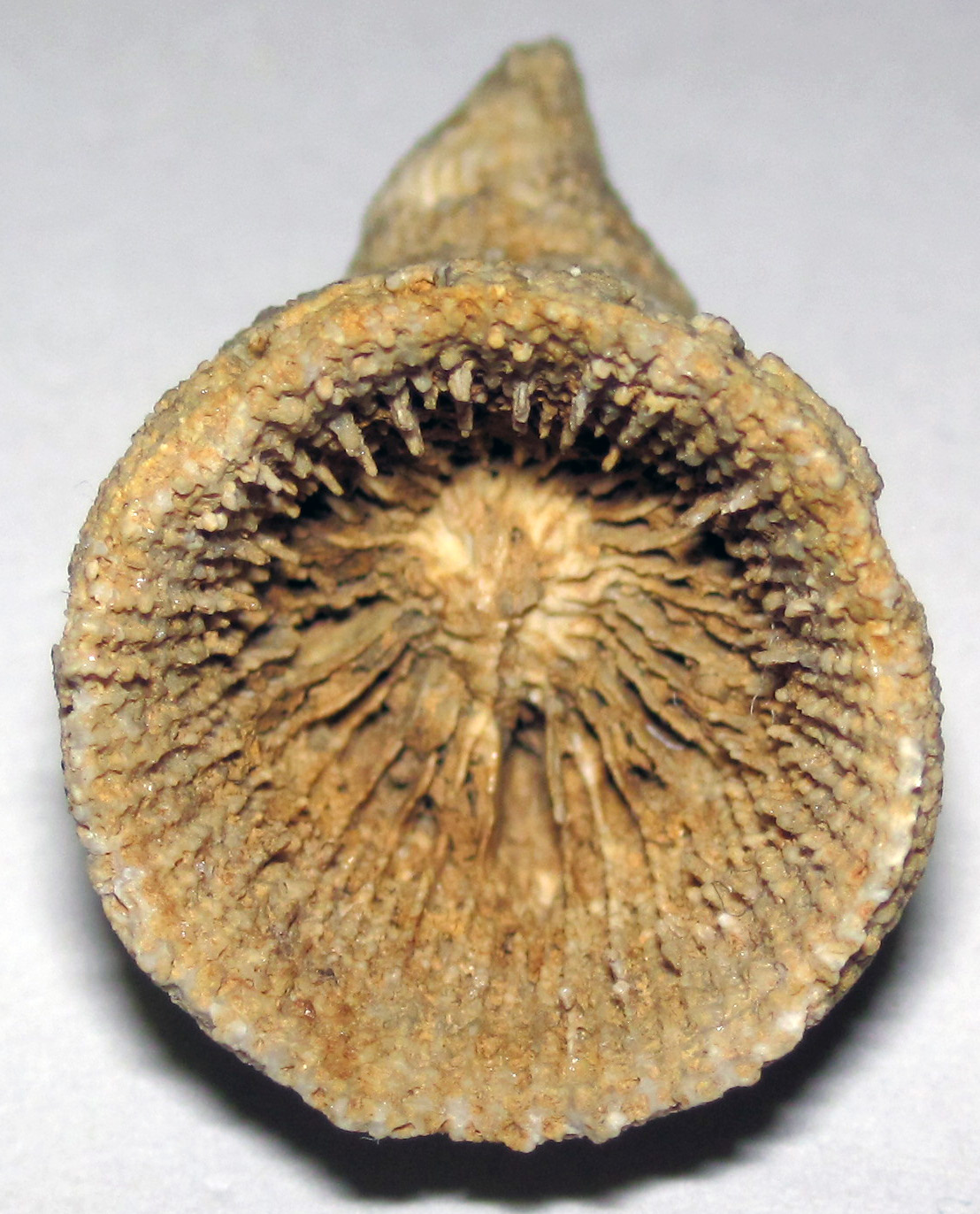
Zaphrentis, a solitary cyathophylline from Middle Devonian Indiana, looking down onto the calyx.

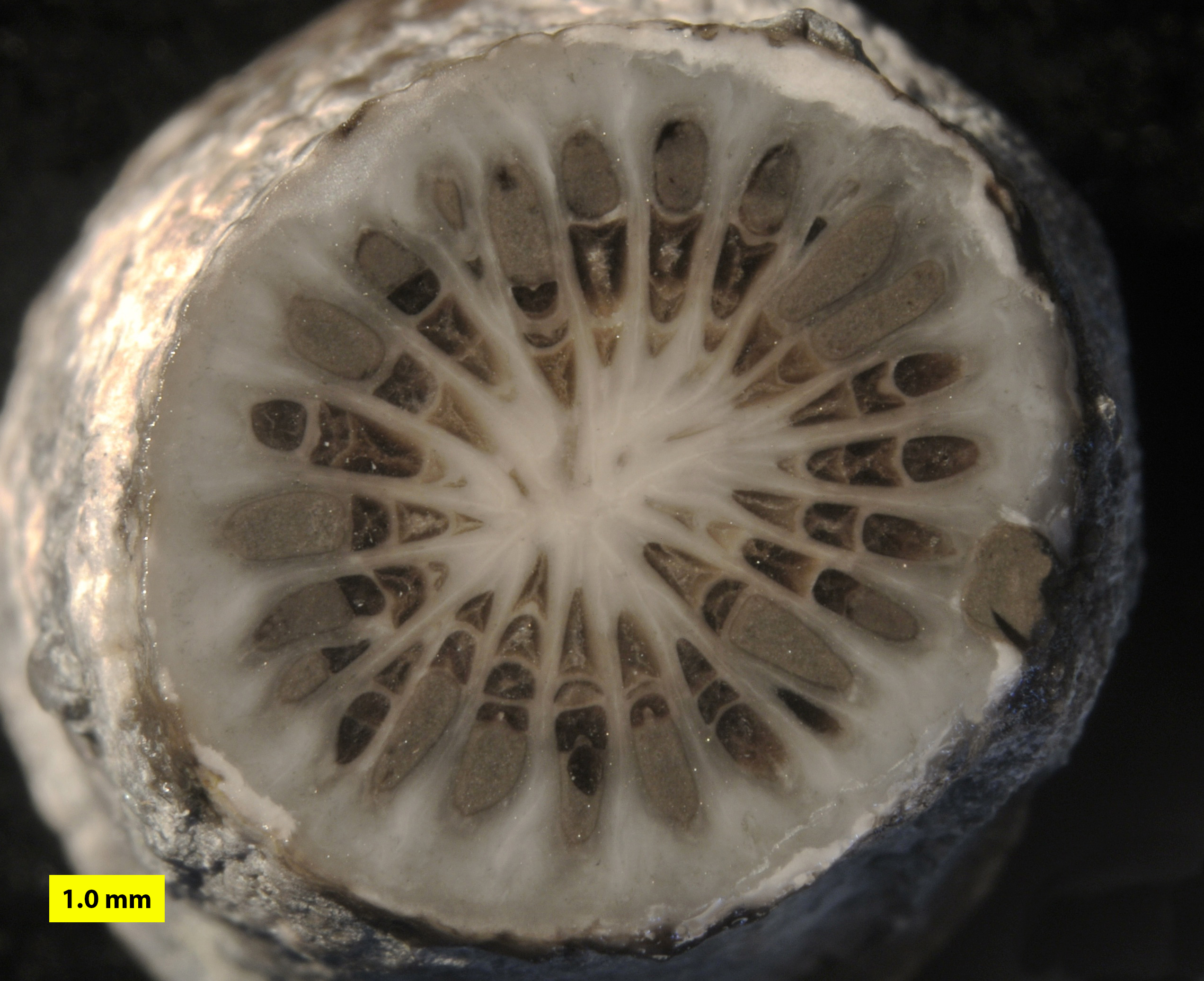
Cross-section of Stereolasma rectum, a solitary stereolasmatine from the Middle Devonian of Erie County, New York

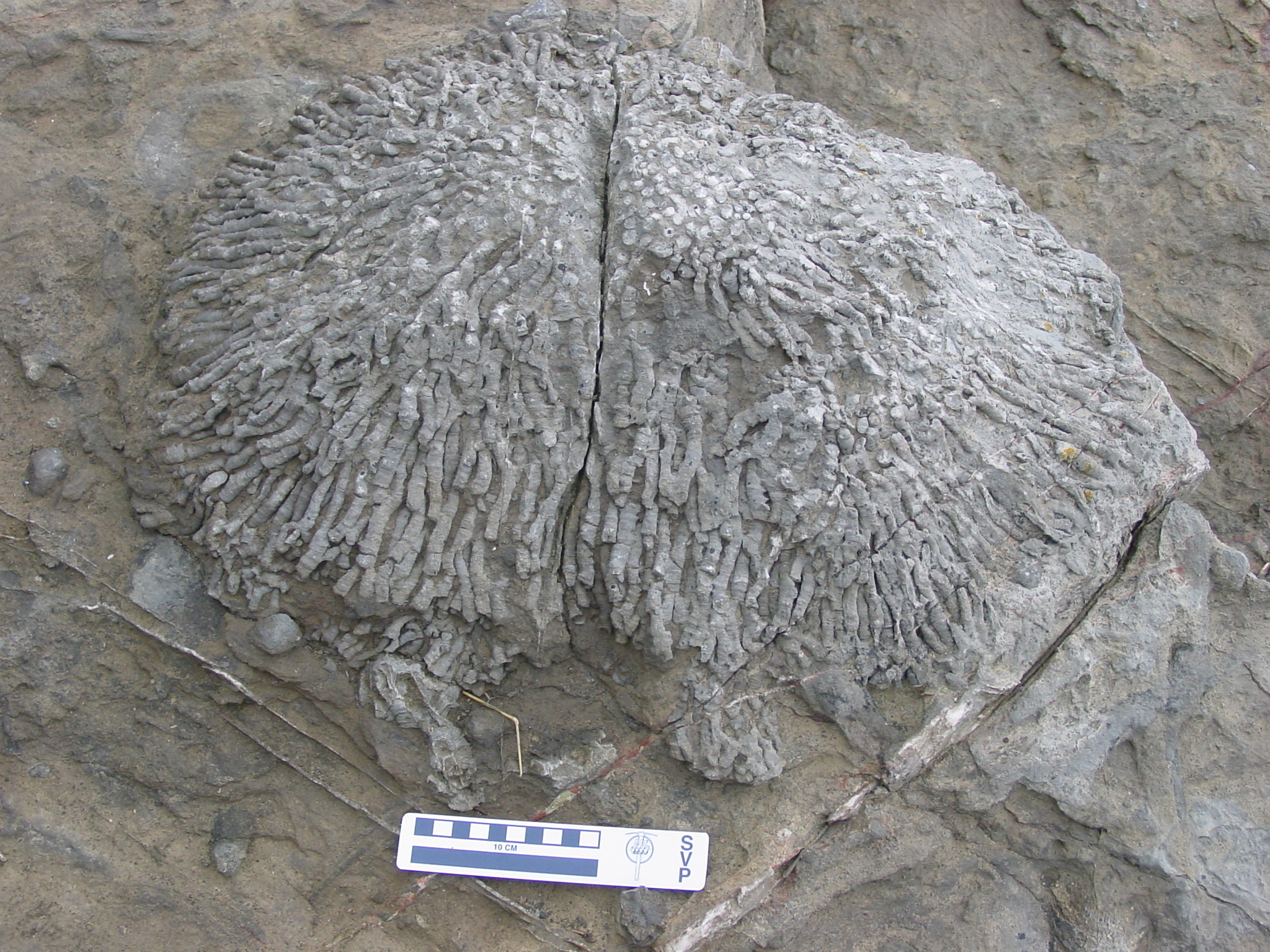
Solenodendron, a colonial lithostrotionine from Mississippian Wales, seen from below
