= List of prehistoric hexacoral genera =

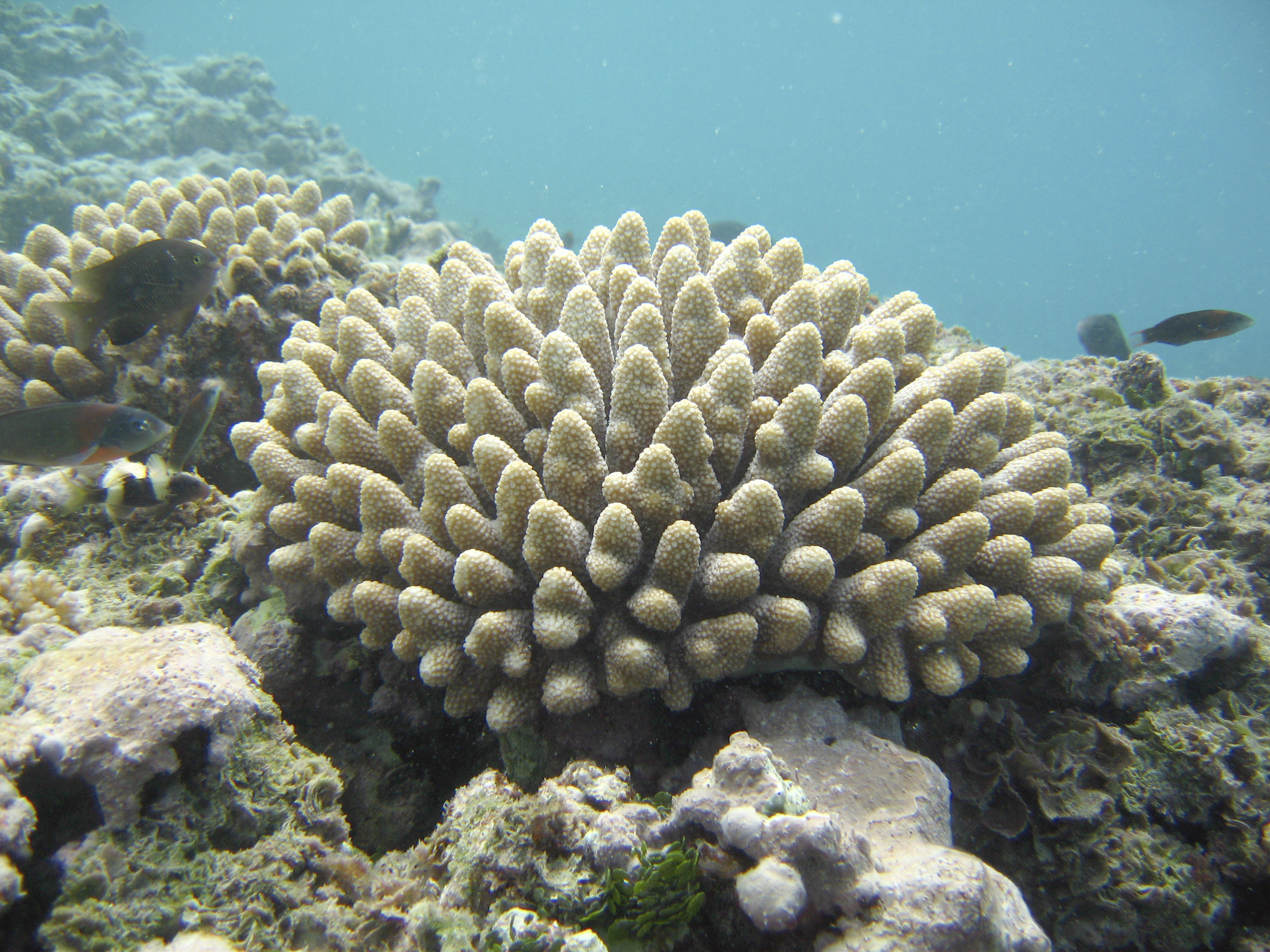
A modern species of the prehistoric hexacoral genus Acropora from near the Hawaiian islands.

This list of prehistoric hexacorals (hexacorallia) is an attempt to create a comprehensive listing of all genera that have ever been included in the hexacorallia which are known from the fossil record. This list excludes purely vernacular terms. It includes all commonly accepted genera, but also genera that are now considered invalid, doubtful (nomina dubia), or were not formally published (nomina nuda), as well as junior synonyms of more established names, and genera that are no longer considered scleractinia.

== Naming conventions and terminology ==
Naming conventions and terminology follow the International Code of Zoological Nomenclature. Technical terms used include:

- Junior synonym: A name which describes the same taxon as a previously published name. If two or more genera are formally designated and the type specimens are later assigned to the same genus, the first to be published (in chronological order) is the senior synonym, and all other instances are junior synonyms. Senior synonyms are generally used, except by special decision of the ICZN, but junior synonyms cannot be used again, even if deprecated. Junior synonymy is often subjective, unless the genera described were both based on the same type specimen.
- Nomen nudum (Latin for "naked name"): A name that has appeared in print but has not yet been formally published by the standards of the ICZN. Nomina nuda (the plural form) are invalid, and are therefore not italicized as a proper generic name would be. If the name is later formally published, that name is no longer a nomen nudum and will be italicized on this list. Often, the formally published name will differ from any nomina nuda that describe the same specimen.
- Nomen oblitum (Latin for "forgotten name"): A name that has not been used in the scientific community for more than fifty years after its original proposal.
- Preoccupied name: A name that is formally published, but which has already been used for another taxon. This second use is invalid (as are all subsequent uses) and the name must be replaced. As preoccupied names are not valid generic names, they will also go unitalicized on this list.
- Nomen dubium (Latin for "dubious name"): A name describing a fossil with no unique diagnostic features. As this can be an extremely subjective and controversial designation, this term is not used on this list.

Contents:	A B C D E F G H I J K L M N O P Q R S T U V W X Y Z — See also

== A ==
- Acaciapora
- Acalepha
- Acanthastrea
- Acanthocyathus
- Acanthogyra
- Acanthophillia
- Acanthophyllia
- Acanthophyllum
- Accurganaxon
- Acdalina
- Acervularia
- Acidolites
- Acinophyllum
- Acmophyllum
- Acrocyathus
- Acrohelia – junior synonym of Galaxea
- Acrophyllum
- Acropora
- Acrosmilia
- Acsaspedites
- Actinacis
- Actinaraea
- Actinaraeopsis
- Actinastaeopsis
- Actinastraea
- Actinocyathus
- Actinophrentis
- Adamanophyllum
- Adaverina
- Adekoheastrea
- Adelocoenia
- Adetopora
- Adinophyllum
- Adkinsella
- Adradosia
- Aemulophyllum
- Agaricia
- Agastophyllum
- Agathelia
- Agathiphyllia
- Agetolitella
- Agetolites
- Aggomorphastraea
- Ahrdorffia
- Ainia
- Akagophyllum
- Akiyosiphyllum
- Aknisophyllum
- Alaiophyllum
- Alakiria
- Alinkioduncanella
- Alleynia
- Allocoenia
- Allocoeniopsis
- Alloiteaucoenia
- Alloiteausmilia
- Allophyllum
- Allotropiophyllum
- Alpinophyllia
- Alpinoseris
- Altaiophyllum
- Altaja
- Alveolites
- Alveolocyathus
- Alveopora
- Amandaraia
- Amandophyllum
- Amaraphyllum
- Amniopora
- Ampakabastraea
- Amphelia
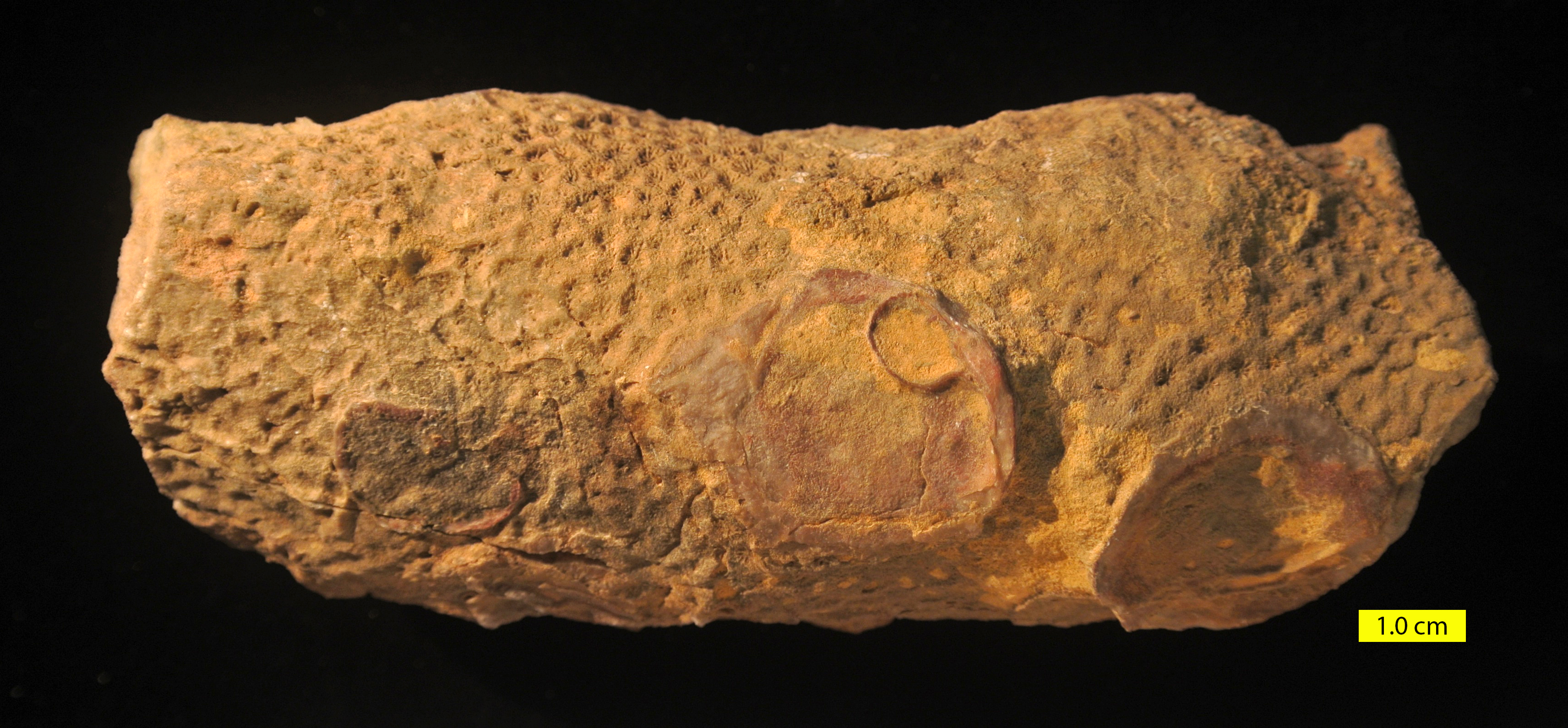
- Amphiastrea Etallon 1859 from the Matmor Formation of southern Israel.
  Amphiastraea
- Amphiaulastrea
- Amphimeandra
- Amphiphora
- Amplexiphyllum
- Amplexizaphrentis
- Amplexocarinia
- Amplexoides
- Amplexus
- Amsdenoides
- Amygdalophyllidium
- Amygdalophylloides
- Amygdalophyllum
- Anactolasma
- Andemantastraea
- Andrazella
- Angeliphyllia
- Angullophyllum
- Angustiphyllum
- Anisastraea
- Anisocoenia
- Anisophyllum
- Ankhelasma
- Annotocyathus
- Anomastraea
- Anomopora
- Antheria
- Antherolites
- Antholites
- Anthostylis
- Antiguastrea
- Antikinkaidia
- Antillia
- Antillocyathus
- Antillophyllia
- Antilloseris
- Antracophyllum
- Apelismilia
- Aphraxonia
- Aphroelasma
- Aphroidophyllum
- Aphrophylloides
- Aphrophyllum
- Aphyllum
- Aplocyathus
- Aplophyllia
- Aplopsammia
- Aplosmilia
- Apocladophyllia
- Aquitanastraea
- Aquitanophyllia
- Arachnastraea
- Arachniophyllum
- Arachnolasma
- Arachnolasmella
- Arachnophyllum
- Araeopoma
- Araeopora
- Araiophyllum
- Araiostrotion
- Archaeolasmogyra
- Archaeophyllia
- Archaeosmilia
- Archaeosmiliopsis
- Archaeozaphrentis
- Archohelia
- Archypora
- Arcocyathus
- Arcoplasma
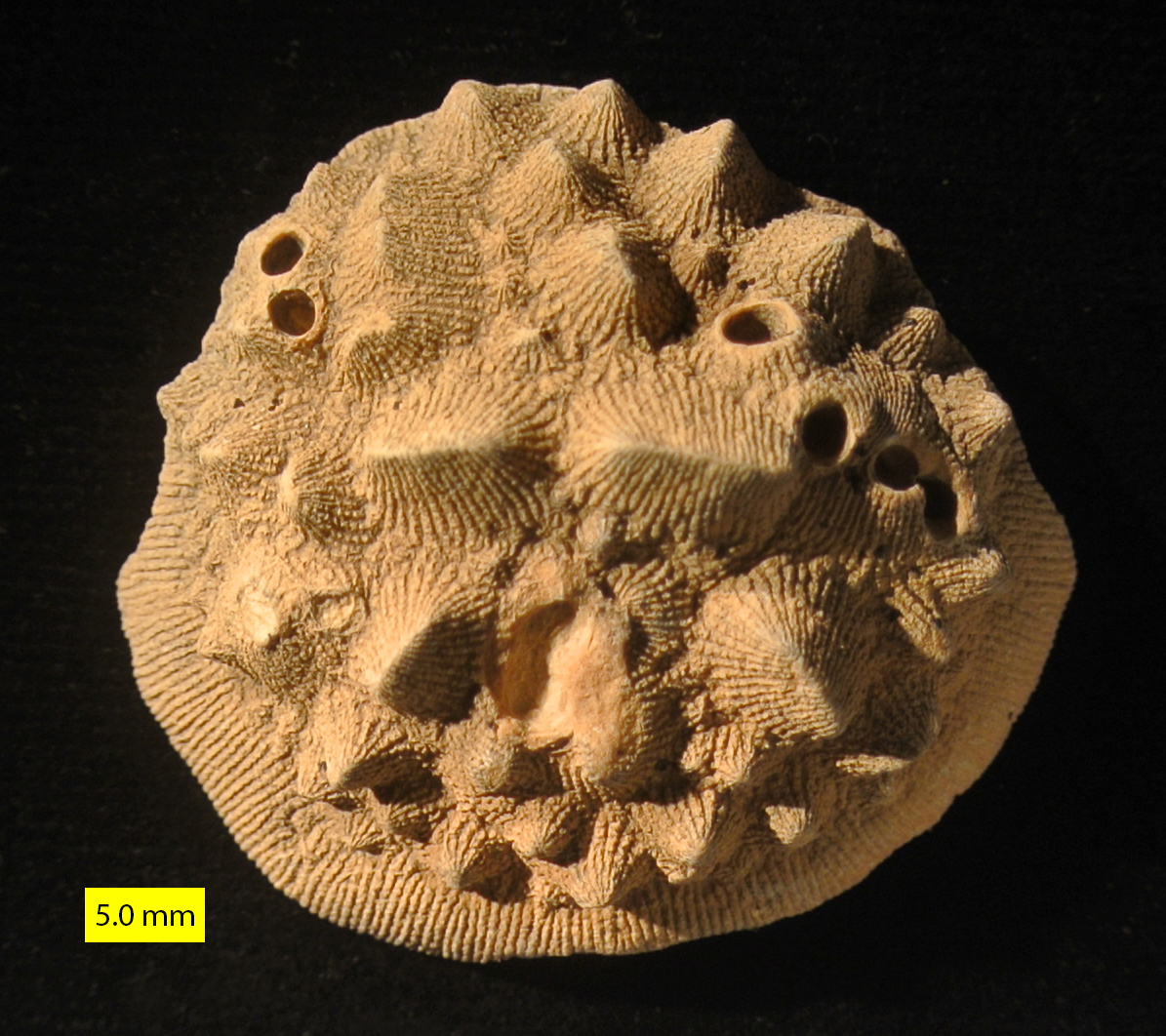
- Aspidiscus cristatus from the Cenomanian (Upper Cretaceous) of southern Israel; oral view.
  Arctangia
- Arctophyllum
- Areopsammia
- Argutastrea
- Aristophyllum
- Armalites
- Asarcophyllum
- Aspasmophyllum
- Asperophyllum
- Aspidastraea
- Aspidiscus
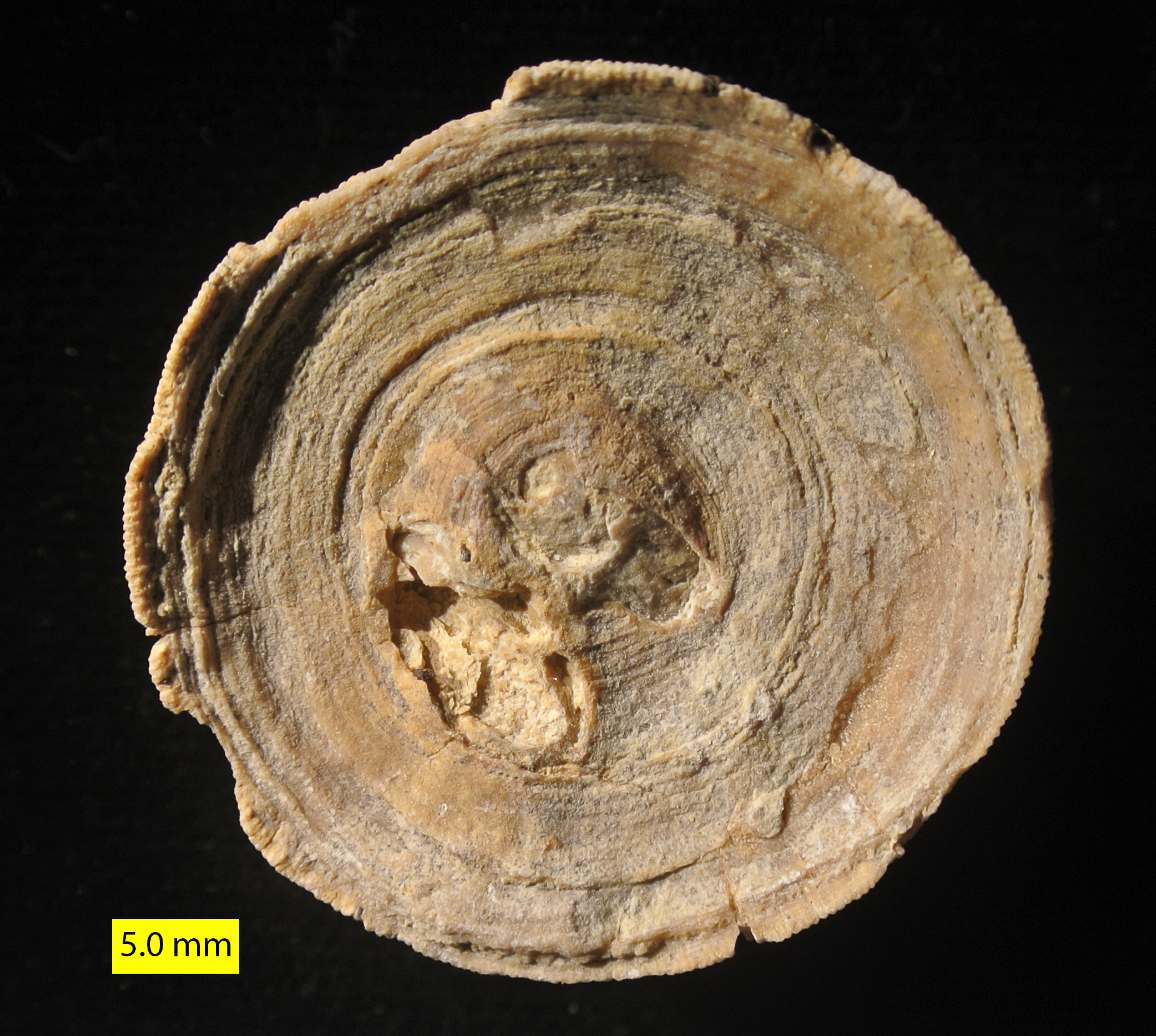
- Aspidiscus cristatus from the Cenomanian (Upper Cretaceous) of southern Israel; aboral view.
  Asserculinia
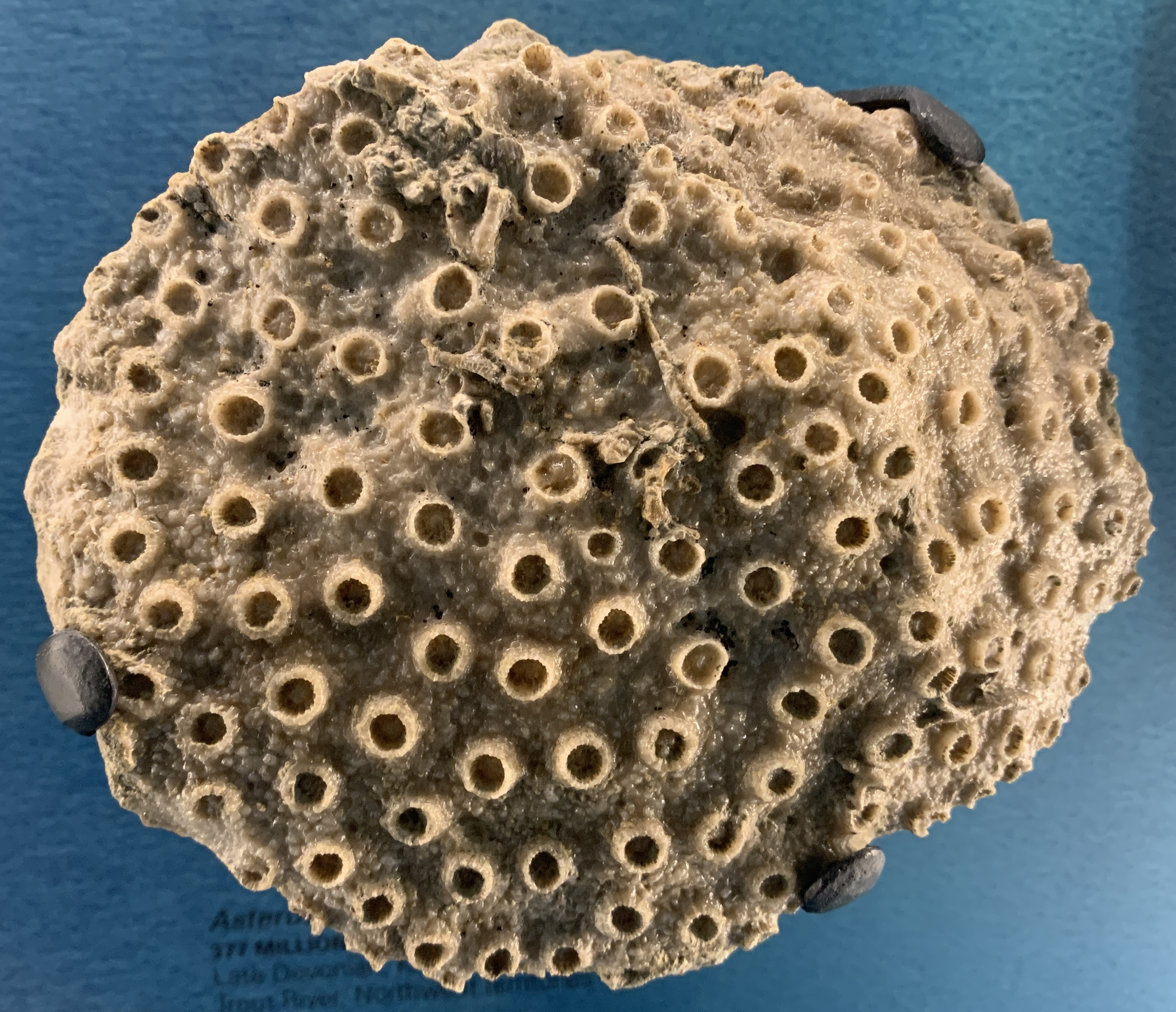
- The rugose coral Asterobillingsia sp. Late Devonian, Kakisa Formation, Trout River, Northwest Territories (Canada). At the Royal Tyrrell Museum of Palaeontology.
  Asterobillingsia
- Asterodisphyllum
- Asterosmilia
- Asthenophyllum
- Astraeofungia
- Astraeomorpha
- Astraeophyllum
- Astrangia
- Astraraea
- Astreopora
- Astrhelia
- Astrictophyllum
- Astrocerium
- Astrocoenia
- Astrogyra
- Astroides
- Asturiphyllum
- Athecastraea
- Atopocoenia
- Aulacophyllum
- Aulastraea
- Aulastraeopora
- Aulina
- Aulocaulis
- Auloclisia
- Aulocystella
- Aulocystis
- Aulohelia
- Aulokoninckophyllum
- Aulophyllum
- Auloporella
- Aulosmilia
- Aulostegites
- Aulostrotion
- Aulostylus
- Aulozoa
- Australophyllum
- Avicenia
- Axinura
- Axiphoria
- Axoclisia
- Axocricophyllum
- Axocyathus
- Axolasma
- Axolithophyllum
- Axophyllum
- Axosmilia
- Axotrochus
- Axuolites

== B ==
- Baikitolites
- Bainbridgia
- Baitalites
- Bajgolia
- Baksanophyllia
- Balanophyllia
- Bantamia
- Barbarella
- Barrandeophyllum
- Baryhelia
- Barylasma
- Baryphyllia
- Baryphyllum
- Barysmilia
- Barytichisma
- Basleophyllum
- Bassius
- Batangophyllum
- Bathmosmilia
- Bathybalva
- Bathycoenia
- Bathycyathus
- Bayhaium
- Beaumontia
- Beiliupora
- Belgradeophyllum
- Beneckastraea
- Bensonastraea
- Benxiphyllum
- Beogradophyllum
- Berkhia
- Bethanyphyllum
- Beugniesastraea
- Bibucia
- Bifossularia
- Bighornia
- Bilaterocoenia
- Billingsaria
- Biphyllum
- Bitraria
- Blastosmilia
- Blothrocyathus
- Blothrophyllum
- Blysmatophyllum
- Bodeurina
- Bodophyllum
- Bogimbailites
- Bojocyclus
- Boolelasma
- Bordenia
- Borelasma
- Bothroclisia
- Bothrophoria
- Bothrophyllum
- Bouvierphyllum
- Bowanophyllum
- Bowenelasma
- Brachiatusmilia
- Brachycoenia
- Brachycyathus
- Brachymeandra
- Brachyphyllia
- Brachyseris
- Bractea
- Bracthelia
- Bracytrochus
- Bradyphyllum
- Brevimaeandra
- Breviphrentis
- Breviphyllum
- Breviseptophyllum
- Briantelasma
- Briantia
- Bucanophyllum
- Budaia
- Bulvankeriphyllum
- Bussonastraea

== C ==
- Calameastolia
- Calamophyllia
- Calamophylliopsis
- Calamoseris
- Calceola
- Caliapora
- Calinastrea
- Calmiussiphyllum
- Calophylloides
- Calophyllum
- Calostylis
- Calostylopsis
- Campophyllum
- Camptolithus
- Camurophyllum
- Canadiphyllum
- Caninella
- Caninia
- Caninophyllum
- Caninostrotion
- Cannapora
- Cantrillia
- Capnophyllum
- Carantophyllum
- Carcicocaenia
- Cardiaphyllum
- Cardiastraea
- Carinotachylasma
- Carinowaagenophyllum
- Carinthiaphyllum
- Carlinastraea
- Carniaphyllum
- Carolastraea
- Carruthersella
- Caryophyllia
- Caryosmilia
- Cassianastraea
- Catactotoechus
- Caulastrea
- Cavilasma
- Ceciliaphyllum
- Celechopora
- Cenomanina
- Centristella
- Ceratocoenia
- Ceratophyllia
- Ceratophyllum
- Ceratopsammia
- Ceratothecia
- Ceratotrochus
- Cereiophyllia
- Ceriaster
- Ceriocysta
- Cerioelasma
- Cerioheterastraea
- Ceriostella
- Ceriphyllum
- Ceristella
- Chalcidophyllum
- Changjianggouphyllum
- Charactophyllum
- Charisphyllum
- Chavsakia
- Cheilosmilia
- Chevalieria
- Chevalierismilia
- Chia
- Chielasma
- Chihsiaphyllum
- Chlamydophyllum
- Choanoplasma
- Chomatoseris
- Chonaxis
- Chondrocoenia
- Chonophyllum
- Chonostegites
- Chostophyllum
- Chuanbeiphyllum
- Chusenophyllum
- Cionodendron
- Circophyllia
- Circophyllum
- Circumtextiphyllum
- Cladangia
- Cladionophyllum
- Cladochonus
- Cladocora
- Cladophyllia
- Cladophylliopsis
- Cladopora
- Clausastraea
- Clausastraeopsis
- Clavilasma
- Claviphyllum
- Cleistopora
- Clinophyllum
- Clisiophyllum
- Clonosmilia
- Coccophyllum
- Coccoseris
- Codonophyllum
- Codonosmilia
- Coelocoenia
- Coelolasma
- Coelomeandra
- Coeloseris
- Coelostylis
- Coenangia
- Coenaphrodia
- Coenastraea
- Coenites
- Coenocyathus
- Coleophyllum
- Collignonastraea
- Colpophyllia
- Columactinastrea
- Columastrea
- Columellogyra
- Columnaphyllia
- Columnaria
- Columnaxon
- Columnocoenia
- Columnogyra
- Columnolasma
- Columnoporella
- Comanaphyllum
- Combophyllum
- Commutatophyllum
- Commutia
- Comophyllastraea
- Comophyllia
- Comophylliopsis
- Comoseris
- Complanophyllum
- Complexastraea
- Complexastraeopsis
- Complexophyllum
- Compressiphyllum
- Confusastraea
- Confusastraraea
- Conicosmiliotrochus
- Connectastrea
- Conocyathus
- Conophyllia
- Conopoterium
- Conosmilia
- Conotrochus
- Contortophyllum
- Convexastraea
- Copia
- Corbariastraea
- Cornwallatia
- Coronocyathus
- Corphalia
- Corrugopora
- Corwenia
- Coryphyllia
- Coscinaraea
- Cosjuvia
- Cosmiolithus
- Craspedophyllia
- Crassialveolites
- Crassicyclus
- Crassilasma
- Crassistella
- Crassophrentis
- Crateniophyllum
- Craterastraea
- Craterophyllum
- Crateroseris
- Cravenia
- Crenulipora
- Crenulites
- Crepidophyllia
- Cricocyathus
- Crista
- Cronyphyllum
- Cruciphyllum
- Cryptangia
- Cryptocoenia
- Cryptolichenaria
- Ctenactis
- Cuctienophyllum
- Cuifastraea
- Cuifia
- Culicia
- Cumminsia
- Cunnolites
- Curtastrum
- Cyanaphyllum
- Cyathactis
- Cyathaxonella
- Cyathaxonia
- Cyathelia
- Cyathoceras
- Cyathoclisia
- Cyathocoenia
- Cyathocylindrum
- Cyathopaedium
- Cyathophora
- Cyathophyllia
- Cyathophylliopsis
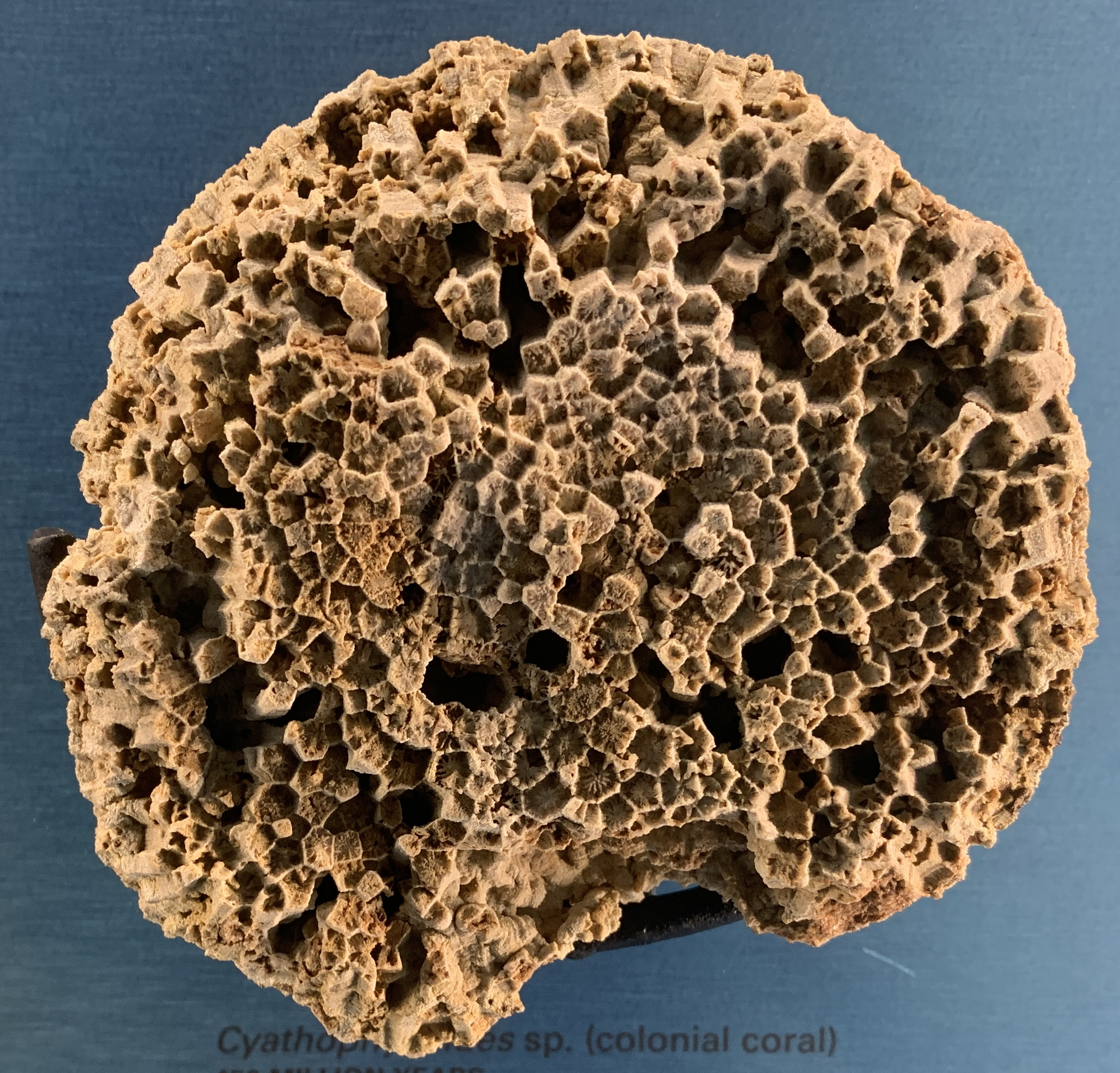
- The rugose coral Cyathophylloides sp., from the late Ordovician, Georgian Bay Formation, Ontario, Canada.
  Cyathophylloides
- Cyathophyllum
- Cyathoseris
- Cyathosmilia
- Cyathotrochus
- Cyclastraea
- Cyclindrocyathus
- Cyclobacia
- Cycloflabellum
- Cyclolites
- Cyclolitopsis
- Cyclomussa
- Cyclophyllia
- Cyclophyllopsis
- Cycloseris
- Cylindrophyllia
- Cylindrophyllum
- Cylindrosmilia
- Cylindrostylus
- Cylismilia
- Cymatelasma
- Cymatella
- Cymosmilia
- Cyphastraea
- Cyrtocyathus
- Cyrtophyllum
- Cystelasma
- Cysticonophyllum
- Cystihalysites
- Cystihexagonaria
- Cystilophophyllum
- Cystipaliphyllum
- Cystiphorolites
- Cystiphylloides
- Cystiphyllum
- Cystitrypanopora
- Cystocantrilla
- Cystodendropora
- Cystolonsdaleia
- Cystolyrielasma
- Cystophrentis
- Cyttaroplasma
- Czarnockia

== D ==
- Dactylaraea
- Dactylocoenia
- Dactylosmilia
- Dagmaraephyllum
- Daljanolites
- Dalmanophyllum
- Dalnia
- Darwasophyllum
- Dasmia
- Dasmiopsis
- Dasmosmilia
- Debnikiella
- Decaheliocoenia
- Decaphyllum
- Defrancia
- Deiracorallium
- Deltocyathus
- Denayphyllum
- Dendracis
- Dendraraea
- Dendrocyathus
- Dendrofavosites
- Dendrogyra
- Dendroholmia
- Dendrophyllia
- Dendrosmilia
- Dendrostella
- Dendrozoum
- Densigrewingkia
- Densiphrentis
- Densiphyllum
- Dentilasma
- Depasophyllum
- Derivatolites
- Dermosastraea
- Dermoseris
- Dermosmilia
- Dermosmiliopsis
- Dermosmiliopsis
- Desmocladia
- Desmocoenia
- Desmophyllum
- Dialeptophyllum
- Dialytophyllum
- Diaschophyllum
- Diblasus
- Dibunophyllum
- Dichocaeniopsis
- Dichocoenia
- Dichophyllia
- Dichotomosmilia
- Dictyaraea
- Dictyofavosites
- Dictyopora
- Diegosmilia
- Diffingia
- Diffusolasma
- Digitosmilia
- Digonoclisia
- Digonophyllum
- Dillerium
- Dimelasma
- Dimorpharaea
- Dimorphastraeopsis
- Dimorphastrea
- Dimorphocoenia
- Dimorphocoeniopsis
- Dimorphofungia
- Dimorphomeandra
- Dimorphophyllia
- Dimorphoseris
- Dimorphosmilia
- Dinophyllum
- Dinostrophinx
- Diorychopora
- Diphyphyllum
- Diplaraea
- Diploastrea
- Diplochone
- Diplocoenia
- Diplocteniopsis
- Diploctenium
- Diploepora
- Diplogyra
- Diplohelia
- Diplophyllum
- Diploria
- Diplothecangia
- Dipterophyllum
- Disaraea
- Discocoenia
- Discocoeniopsis
- Discocyathus
- Discoidocyathus
- Discosmilia
- Discotrochus
- Disphyllia
- Disphyllum
- Distichoflabellum
- Distichomeandra
- Distichophyllia
- Ditoecholasma
- Diversiphyllum
- Dohmophyllum
- Dokophyllum
- Dominicotrochus
- Donacophyllum
- Donacosmilia
- Donetzites
- Donophyllum
- Dordonophyllia
- Dorlodotia
- Drewerelasma
- Dubrovia
- Ducdonia
- Duncanella
- Duncania
- Duncanopora
- Duncanopsammia
- Duncanosmilia
- Dungulia
- Duplocarinia
- Duplophyllum
- Durhamina
- Dushanophrentis
- Dybowskinia

== E ==
- Eastonastraea
- Eastonoides
- Ebocotrochus
- Ebrayia
- Eburneotrochus
- Echigophyllum
- Echinophyllia
- Echinopora
- Echyropora
- Eckastraea
- Edaphophyllum
- Edwardsastraea
- Edwardsomeandra
- Edwardsoseris
- Edwardsosmilia
- Edwardsotrochus
- Egosiella
- Ekvasophyllum
- Elasmocoenia
- Elasmofungia
- Elasmogyra
- Elasmophora
- Elasmophyllia
- Elasmophyllum
- Elephantaria
- Ellesmerelasma
- Ellipsasteria
- Ellipsocoenia
- Ellipsocyathus
- Ellipsoidastraea
- Ellipsosmilia
- Elliptoseris
- Elysastraea
- Embolophyllum
- Emmonsia
- Emmonsiella
- Empodesma
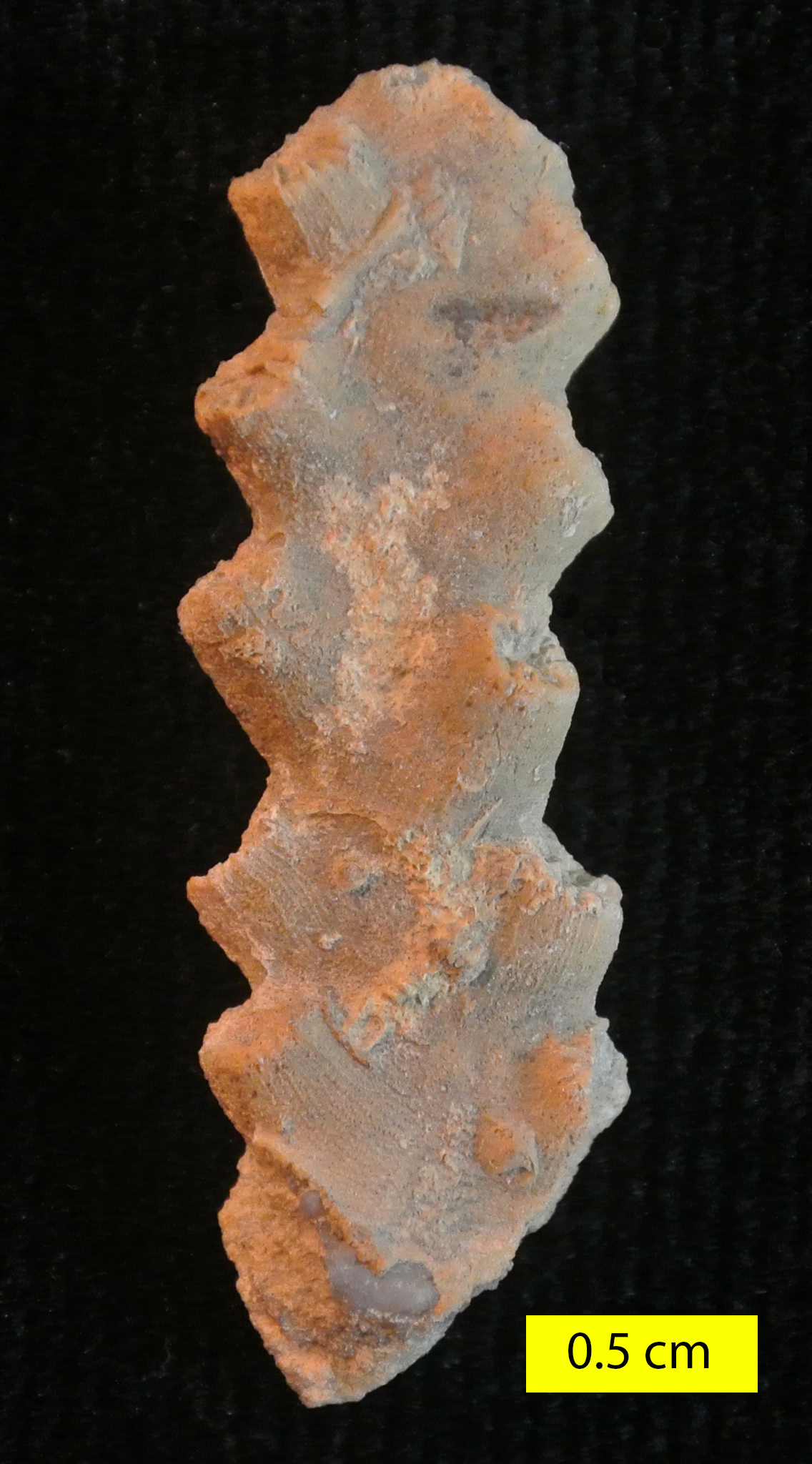
- Enallhelia, a Callovian (Middle Jurassic) scleractinian coral from the Matmor Formation of southern Israel.
  Enallhelia
- Enallocoenia
- Enallophrentis
- Enallopsammia
- Endamplexus
- Endopachys
- Endophyllum
- Endothecium
- Enigmalites
- Entelophyllia
- Entelophyllum
- Enterolasma
- Enygmophyllum
- Eocatenipora
- Eofletcheria
- Eofletcheriella
- Eoglossophyllum
- Eohydnophora
- Eolaminoplasma
- Eostrotion
- Epiphanophyllum
- Epiphyllum
- Epismilia
- Epismiliopsis
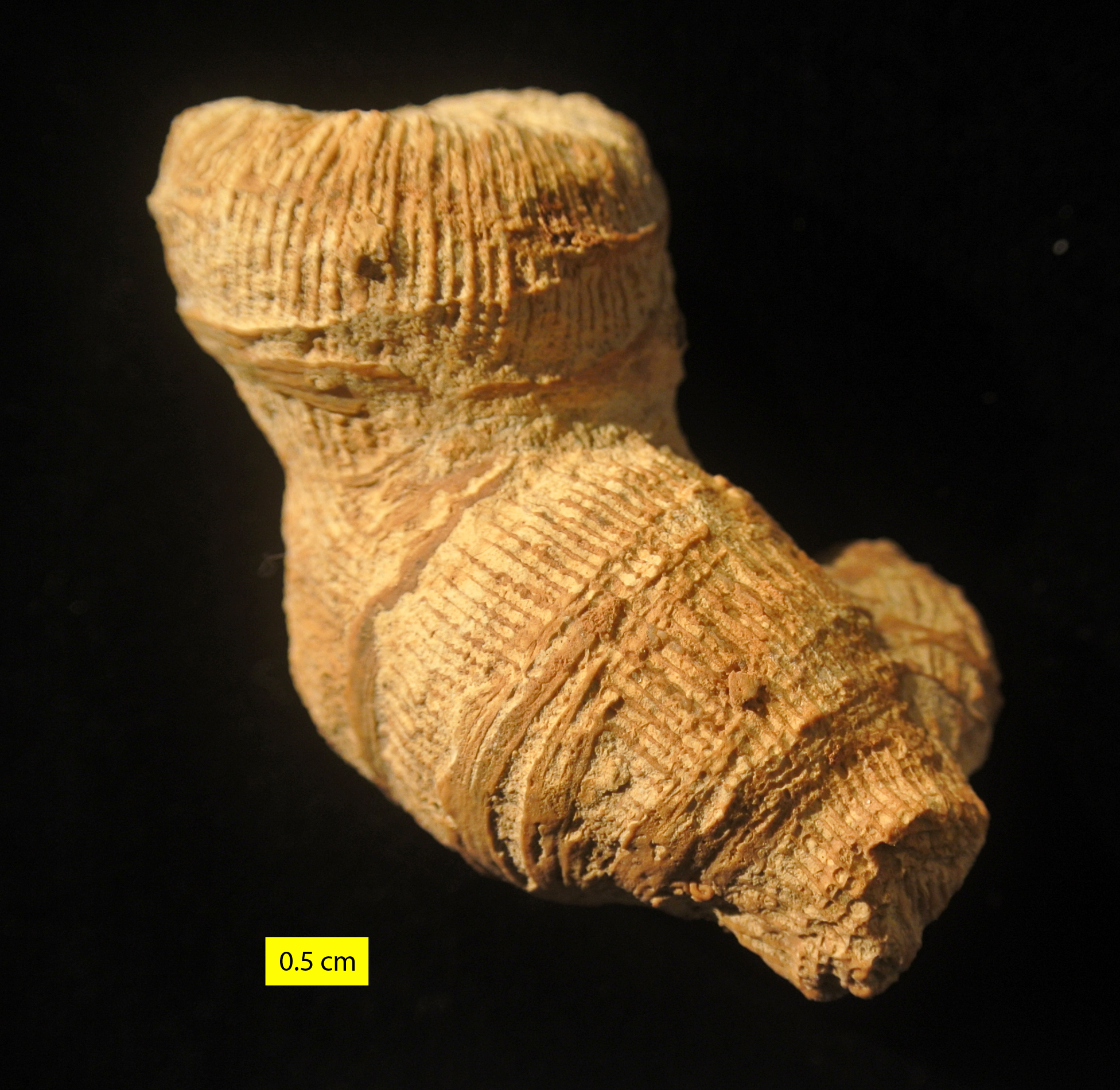
- Epistreptophyllum, a scleractinian coral from the Matmor Formation (Callovian, Middle Jurassic) of southern Israel; side view.
  Epistreptophyllum
- Epitrochus
- Ericina
- Eridophyllum
- Erlangbapora
- Esthonia
- Estonielasma
- Etallonasteria
- Eugyra
- Eugyriopsis
- Euhelia
- Euphyllia
- Eupsammia
- Euryphyllum
- Eusmilia
- Eusmiliopsis
- Eusthenotrochus
- Evenkiella
- Ewaldocoenia
- Exilifrons
- Exostega

== F ==
- Faberolasma
- Faberophyllum
- Fainella
- Faksephyllia
- Falsicatenipora
- Famaxonia
- Famennelasma
- Farabophyllum
- Fasciatiphyllia
- Fasciculiamplexus
- Fasciculophyllum
- Fasciphyllum
- Fasciseris
- Favia
- Favistina
- Favites
- Favitopsis
- Faxsephyllia
- Fedorowskicyathus
- Fedorowskiella
- Felixaraea
- Felixastraea
- Felixigyra
- Ferrya
- Ficariastraea
- Flabellosmilia
- Flabellum
- Flagellophyllum
- Fletcheria
- Fletcheriella
- Fletcherina
- Flindersipora
- Floria
- Foerstephyllum
- Fomichevia
- Fomichivella
- Fossaphyllia
- Fossopora
- Fossoporella
- Frechastrea
- Frescocyathus
- Friedbergia
- Fromentellia
- Fromentelligyra
- Fromeophyllum
- Fruehwirthia
- Fuchungopora
- Fungia
- Fungiacyathus
- Fungiastraea
- Funginella
- Funginellastrea
- Fungophyllia

== G ==
- Gablonzeria
- Galaxea
- Gallitellia
- Gangamophyllum
- Gaofengophyllum
- Gardineroseris
- Gaynaphyllum
- Gazimuria
- Genabacia
- Gerthia
- Gertholites
- Geyeronaotia
- Geyerophyllum
- Ghirobocyathus
- Gigantostylis
- Gillastraea
- Gissarophyllum
- Glenaraea
- Glossophyllum
- Goldfussastrea
- Gombertiphyllia
- Goniastrea
- Goniocora
- Goniophyllum
- Goniopora
- Gonioseris
- Gorizdronia
- Gorskyella
- Gorskyites
- Gosaviaraea
- Grabauphyllum
- Gracilopora
- Grandalveolites
- Grandifavia
- Granulidictyum
- Granulina
- Gravieropsamma
- Gregorycoenia
- Grewgiphyllum
- Grewingkia
- Groenlandophyllum
- Groessensia
- Grumiphyllia
- Grypophyllum
- Gshelia
- Guanziyaopora
- Gubbera
- Guembelastraea
- Guerichiphyllum
- Guizhoustriatopora
- Gundarina
- Gurieuskiella
- Guynia
- Gyalophyllum
- Gyaloplasma
- Gymnophyllum
- Gyrodendron

== H ==
- Hadrophyllum
- Haimeicyclus
- Haimesastraea
- Haimesiphyllia
- Hallia
- Halomitra
- Halysitastraea
- Halysites
- Hamarilopora
- Hankaxis
- Haplaraera
- Haplohelia
- Haplolasma
- Haplothecia
- Hapsiphyllum
- Hapsizaphrentis
- Haptaphyllina
- Haptophyllum
- Hattonia
- Hayasakaia
- Hebukophyllum
- Hedeliastraea
- Hedstroemophyllum
- Heintzella
- Helenolites
- Helicelasma
- Heliocïenia
- Heliofungia
- Heliolites
- Heliophyllum
- Helioplasma
- Helioplasmolites
- Helioseris
- Heliostylina
- Helladophyllia
- Helloceras
- Helminthidium
- Hemiaulacophyllum
- Hemicosmophyllum
- Hemiplasmopora
- Hemiporites
- Hercophyllum
- Heritschiella
- Heritschioides
- Herpolitha
- Heterastraea
- Heterocaninia
- Heterocoenia
- Heterocoenites
- Heterocyathus
- Heterogyra
- Heterolasma
- Heterophaulactis
- Heterophrentis
- Heterophyllia
- Heterophylloides
- Heteropsammia
- Heterospongophyllum
- Hexagonaria
- Hexaheliocïenia
- Hexalasma
- Hexapetalum
- Hexaphyllia
- Hexismia
- Hezhangophyllum
- Hezhouphyllum
- Hillaepora
- Hillaxon
- Hillophyllum
- Hindeastraeá
- Hinganastraea
- Hiroshimaphyllum
- Hispaniastraea
- Holacanthopora
- Holcotrochus
- Holmophyllum
- Holocùsôió
- Holophragma
- Homalophyllites
- Homalophyllum
- Homophyllia
- Honggulosma
- Hornsundia
- Houershanophyllum
- Huananaxonia
- Huangia
- Huanglongophyllum
- Huangophyllum
- Huayunophyllum
- Hunanophrentis
- Hydnophora
- Hydnophorabacia
- Hydnophorareá
- Hydnophoromeandraraea
- Hydnophoroseris
- Hydnophyllon
- Hydnoseris
- Hydrocsaspedota
- Hykeliphyllum
- Hyostragulum

== I ==
- Ibukiphyllum
- Icaunhelia
- Idiophyllum
- Idiotrochus
- Ilariosmilia
- Immenovia
- Implicophyllum
- Indiophyllum
- Indophyllia
- Indosmilia
- Innapora
- Insoliphyllum
- Intersmilia
- Iowaphyllum
- Ipsiphyllum
- Iranophyllum
- Ironella
- Isástraea
- Isastrocoenia
- Isïphyllastrea
- Isophyllia
- Issolites
- Ivanovia
- Ivdelephyllum
- Ixogyra

== J ==
- Jiangshanolites
- Jintingophyllum
- Jipaolasma

== K ==
- Kabakovitchiella
- Kakisaphyllum
- Kaljolasma
- Kángilacùathus
- Karagemia
- Káratchasôraea
- Katranophyllum
- Kazachiphyllum
- Keimanelasma
- Kenelasma
- Kenophyllum
- Kepingophyllum
- Kerforneidictyum
- Keriophyllia
- Keriophylloides
- Ketophylloides
- Ketophyllum
- Keyserlingophyllum
- Khangailites
- Khmeria
- Kiaerites
- Kiaerolites
- Kielcephyllum
- Kilbuchophyllum
- Kimilites
- Kinkaidia
- Kionelasma
- Kionophyllum
- Kionotrochus
- Kitakamilia
- Kitakamiphyllum
- Kizilia
- Klaamannipora
- Klamathastrea
- Kleopatrina
- Kobeha
- Kobyastraea
- Kobycoenia
- Kodonophyllum
- Koilocoenia
- Koilotrochus
- Kologyra
- Kolymopora
- Kompsasteria
- Koninckocarina
- Koninckophylloides
- Koninckophyllum
- Kowalaephyllum
- Kozlowskinia
- Kozlowskiocystia
- Ksiazkiewiczia
- Kuangxiastraea
- Kueichouphyllum
- Kueichowpora
- Kuhnastraea
- Kullmannophyllum
- Kumbiopsammia
- Kumpanophyllum
- Kungejophyllum
- Kunthia
- Kusbassophyllum
- Kwangsiphyllum
- Kyphophyllum
- Kysylagathophyllum

== L ==
- Labyrinthites
- Laccophyllum
- Laceripora
- Lambelasma
- Lambeophyllum
- Lamellaeoporella
- Lamellastraea
- Lamellofungia
- Lamellomeandra
- Lamellophyllia
- Laminocyathus
- Lamottia
- Langenhemia
- Lasmosmilia
- Laterophyllia
- Latiastrea
- Latiphyllia
- Latomeandra
- Latusastrea
- Lecfedites
- Leiopathes
- Lekanophyllum
- Leolasma
- Leonardophyllum
- Lepiconus
- Lepidophyllia
- Lepidophylliopsis
- Leptastrea
- Leptelasma
- Leptocyathus
- Leptomussa
- Leptophyllaraea
- Leptophyllastraea
- Leptophyllia
- Leptophyllon
- Leptoria
- Leptoseris
- Lesliella
- Lessnikovaea
- Leurelasma
- Levicyathus
- Liangshanophyllum
- Liardiphyllum
- Liauria
- Lichenaria
- Lindstroemia
- Lindstroemophyllum
- Liptodendron
- Liscombea
- Litharaeopsis
- Lithophyllon
- Lithostrotion
- Lithostrotionella
- Lithostrozionoides
- Lithotrotionoides
- Litvolasma
- Lobocorallium
- Lobophyllia
- Lobopsammia
- Loboseris
- Lochmaeosmilia
- Longiclava
- Longlinophyllia
- Lonsdaleia
- Lonsdaleiastraea
- Lonsdaleoides
- Loomberaphyllum
- Lophamplexus
- Lophelia
- Lophocarinophyllum
- Lopholasma
- Lophophrentis
- Lophophyllia
- Lophophyllidium
- Lophophyllum
- Lophosmilia
- Lophotichium
- Loyolophyllum
- Lublinophyllum
- Lubowastraea
- Lupitschia
- Lyliophyllum
- Lyopora
- Lyrielasma
- Lythophyllum
- Lytvolasma
- Lytvophyllum

== M ==
- Macgeea
- Macgeopsis
- Mackenzia
- Mackenziephyllum
- Madracis
- Madrepora
- Maeandramorpha
- Maendroseris
- Maendrostylis
- Maikottaphyllum
- Maikottia
- Majiaobaphyllum
- Manicina
- Manipora
- Mansuyphyllum
- Margarastraea
- Margarastreopsis
- Margarophyllia
- Margarosmilia
- Marisastrum
- Mariusilites
- Martinophyllum
- Mastopora
- Matejkia
- Maurenia
- Mazaphyllum
- Mcleodea
- Meandraraea
- Meandrastrea
- Meandrina
- Meandrophyllia
- Meandroria
- Meandrosmilia
- Meandrostylis
- Meandrovoltzeia
- Mecloudius
- Medinophyllum
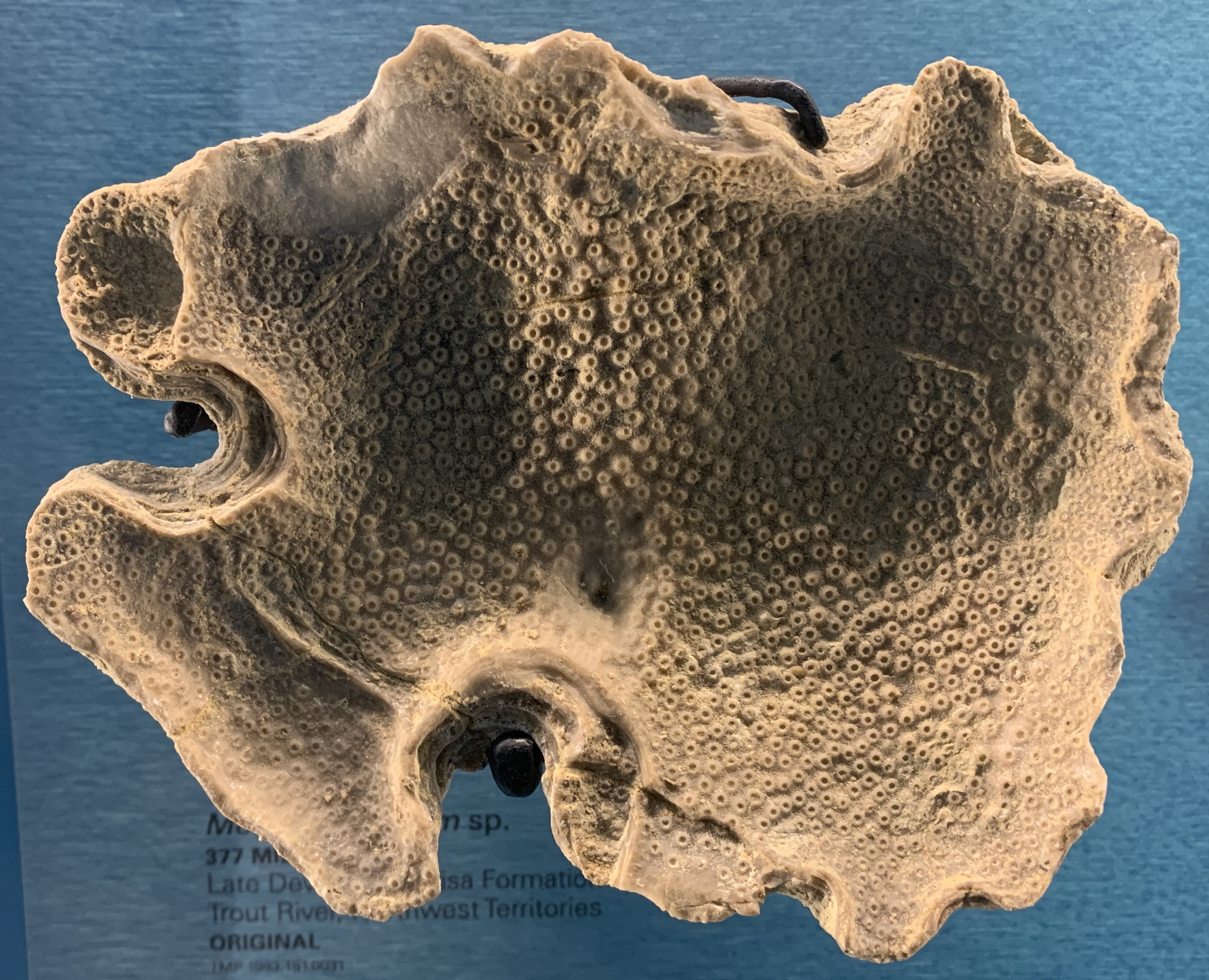
- Medusaephyllum sp. Late Devonian, Kakisa Formation, Trout River, Northwest Territories (Canada). At the Royal Tyrrell Museum of Palaeontology.
  Medusaephyllum
- Meitanopora
- Melanophyllidium
- Melanophyllum
- Melikerona
- Melrosia
- Meniscophyllum
- Menophyllum
- Merlewoodia
- Merulina
- Mesofavosites
- Mesolites
- Mesomorpha
- Mesophyllum
- Mesosolenia
- Mesouralina
- Metrionaxon
- Metriophyllum
- Metrioplexus
- Michelinaraea
- Michelottiphyllia
- Micrabacia
- Microcyathus
- Microcyclus
- Microphyllia
- Microphylliopsis
- Microplasma
- Microsmilia
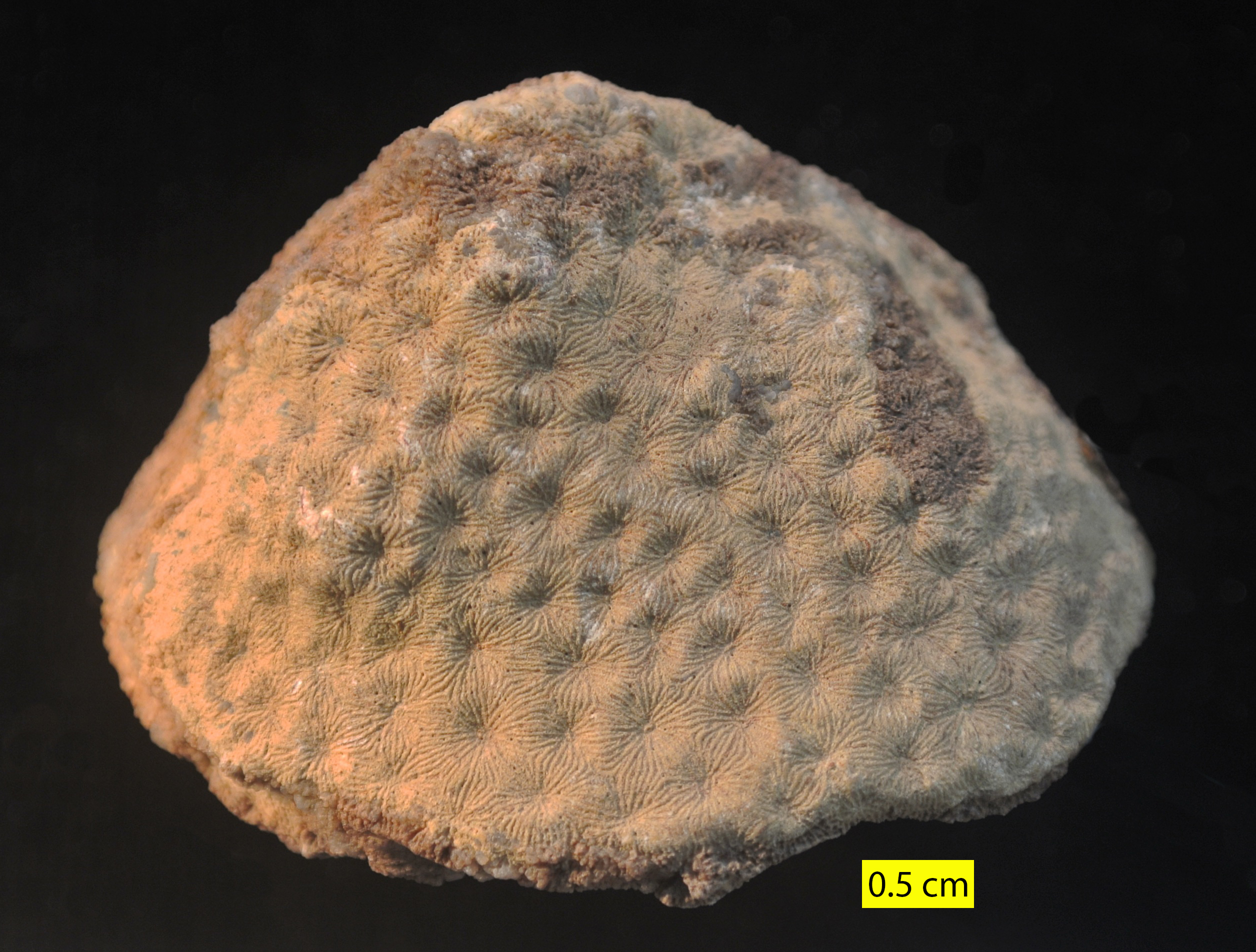
- The scleractinian coral Microsolena from the Matmor Formation, Middle Jurassic, southern Israel.
  Microsolena
- Microsolenastraea
- Mictocystis
- Mictophyllum
- Micula
- Miculiella
- Migmatophyllum
- Mikkwaphyllum
- Minatoa
- Minatolites
- Minussiella
- Miophora
- Mioscapophyllia
- Mioseris
- Miroelasma
- Miscellosmilia
- Misistella
- Mitrodendron
- Mixastraea
- Mixogonaria
- Miyakosimilia
- Mochlophyllum
- Modesta
- Molophyllum
- Molukkia
- Mongoliolites
- Monocyclastraea
- Monomyces
- Monsteraphyllum
- Montastraea
- Monticuliphyllia
- Monticyathus
- Montipora
- Montlivaltia
- Moorowipora
- Moravophyllum
- Morchellastraea
- Morphastrea
- Morycastraea
- Mucophyllum
- Multicarinophyllum
- Multicolumnastraea
- Multisolenia
- Multithecopora
- Murphyphyllum
- Mussa
- Mussisíilia
- Mycedium
- Mycetaraea
- Mycetophyllia
- Mycetophylliopsis
- Mycetoseries
- Myriophyllia
- Myriophyllum

== N ==
- Nadotia
- Nagatophyllum
- Nalivkinella
- Nanshanophyllum
- Naoides
- Naos
- Nataliella
- Natalophyllum
- Navoites
- Neaxon
- Neaxonella
- Neepaliphyllum
- Nefocoenia
- Nefophyllia
- Nemistium
- Neoaspongophyllum
- Neobrachyelasma
- Neocaeniopsis
- Neocantrilla
- Neoclissiophyllum
- Neocoenia
- Neocolumnaria
- Neoconophyllia
- Neocystiphyllum
- Neofletcheriella
- Neokeyserlingophyllum
- Neokoninckophyllum
- Neokyphophyllum
- Neomphyma
- Neomultithecopora
- Neopaliphyllum
- Neopetrozium
- Neoroemeria
- Neospongophylloides
- Neostringophylloides
- Neosyringopora
- Neotabularia
- Neotemnophyllum
- Neotryplasma
- Neovepresiphyllum
- Neowormsipora
- Neozaphrentis
- Nephelophyllum
- Nerthastraea
- Nervophyllum
- Nevadaphyllum
- Niajuphyllum
- Nicaeotrochus
- Nicholsoniella
- Ninghuaphyllum
- Ningnanophyllum
- Ningqiangolites
- Ningquiangophyllum
- Nipponophyllum
- Nitkovicepora
- Nodophyllum
- Nordastrea
- Nothaphrophyllum
- Nothophyllum
- Notocyathus
- Notophyllia
- Novichuskia
- Numidiaphyllum
- Nyctopora

== O ==
- Octoheliocoenia
- Oculina
- Oculinella
- Oculipora
- Odontocyathoides
- Odontocyathus
- Odontophyllum
- Oedalmia
- Ogilviastraea
- Ogilvilasma
- Ogilvinella
- Oharaia
- Ohnopora
- Oligophylloides
- Oligophyllum
- Oliveria
- Omiphyllum
- Omphalophyllia
- Omphalophylliopsis
- Onchotrochus
- Ondadiplocteniopsis
- Onychophyllum
- Opiphyllum
- Oppelisíilia
- Orbignycoenia
- Orbignygyra
- Orionastraea
- Ornatophyllum
- Orthocyathus
- Ortholites
- Orthophyllum
- Orygmophyllum
- Oulangia
- Oulastrea
- Oulophyllia
- Ovalastraeopsis
- Ovalastrea
- Oyonnaxastraea
- Ozakiphyllum
- Ozopora

== P ==
- Paãhythecalis
- Pachycoenia
- Pachycyathus
- Pachydendron
- Pachyfavosites
- Pachygyra
- Pachyhelioplasma
- Pachylites
- Pachyphragma
- Pachyphyllia
- Pachypora
- Pachyseris
- Pachysolenia
- Pachystelliporella
- Pachystriatopora
- Paeckelmannopora
- Palaeacis
- Palaearaea
- Palaeastraea
- Palaeastraea
- Palaeocorolites
- Palaeocyathus
- Palaeocyclus
- Palaeoentelophyllum
- Palaeofavosipora
- Palaeohelia
- Palaeolithostrotion
- Palaeomussa
- Palaeophyllia
- Palaeophyllum
- Palaeoplesiastraea
- Palaeoporites
- Palaeopsammia
- Palaeosmilia
- Palaeosmilia
- Palastraea
- Palastreopora
- Paleoalvolites
- Paleoastroides
- Paleogrypophyllum
- Paliphyllum
- Palocyathus
- Pamirophyllum
- Pamiroseris
- Pantophyllum
- Papiliophyllum
- Paraaulina
- Parabrachyellasma
- Paracannia
- Paracarruthersella
- Paraclausastraea
- Paracolumnaria
- Paracunnolites
- Paracyathus
- Paracycloseries
- Paracystiphylloides
- Paradeltocyathus
- Paradisphyllum
- Paradistichophyllum
- Paradoxaphyllia
- Paraduplophyllum
- Parafletcharia
- Parahalomitra
- Paraheritschioides
- Paraipciphyllum
- Paralithostrotion
- Paralleynia
- Paramichelina
- Paramixogonaria
- Paramplexoides
- Parapavona
- Paraphyllogyra
- Paraplacocoenia
- Parapleurosmélia
- Pararachnastraea
- Pararachnastraea
- Parasarcinula
- Parasiphonophyllia
- Parasmilia
- Parasmithiphyllum
- Parasociophyllum
- Parasôraeopora
- Parastauria
- Parastelliporella
- Parasterophrentis
- Parastraeoíorpha
- Parastriatopora
- Parastriatoporella
- Parasynastraea
- Paratetradium
- Parathecosmilia
- Parathysanophyllum
- Parawentzelella
- Parawentzellophyllum
- Parazolophyllia
- Parazonophyllum
- Parepisoilia
- Paretallonia
- Pareynia
- Parisastraea
- Paronastrara
- Parvaxon
- Paterophyllum
- Pattalophyllia
- Pattalophylliopsis
- Pavastehphyllum
- Pavona
- Pectinia
- Pedderelasma
- Peneckiella
- Pentacoenia
- Pentamplexus
- Pentaphyllia
- Pentaphyllum
- Peplosmilia
- Peponocyathus
- Peripaedium
- Periphacelopora
- Periseris
- Peronophyllum
- Petalaxis
- Petraia
- Petraiella
- Petraphyllum
- Petridictyum
- Petronella
- Petrophylliella
- Petrozium
- Pexiphyllum
- Phacelepismilia
- Phacellastraea
- Phacellocoenia
- Phacellophyllum
- Phacelloplasma
- Phacelophyllia
- Phacelostylophyllum
- Phaulactis
- Phillipsastrea
- Phineus
- Phyllangia
- Phyllocoenia
- Phyllogyra
- Phyllohelia
- Phylloseriopsis
- Phylloseris
- Phyllosmilia
- Phymatophyllum
- Physogyra
- Physoseris
- Phytogyra
- Phytopsis
- Piceaphyllum
- Pilophyllia
- Pilophylloides
- Pinacophyllum
- Pindosmilia
- Pironastrea
- Placocoenia
- Placocoeniopsis
- Placocyathus
- Placogyra
- Placogyropsis
- Placophora
- Placophyllia
- Placosmilia
- Placotrochus
- Planalveolitella
- Planalveolites
- Planetophyllum
- Planocoenites
- Plasmadictyon
- Plasmophyllum
- Plasmoporella
- Platyaxum
- Platycoenia
- Platycyathus
- Platygyra
- Platyhelia
- Platytrochopsis
- Platytrochus
- Plavecia
- Pleophyllum
- Pleramplexus
- Plerodiffia
- Plesiastrea
- Plesiocaryophyllia
- Plesiocoenia
- Plesiocunnolitopsis
- Plesiodiplcteniopsis
- Plesiodiploria
- Plesiofavia
- Plesiomontlivaltia
- Plesiophyllia
- Plesiophyllum
- Plesiosiderastraea
- Plesiostylina
- Plesiothamnasteria
- Pleurocora
- Pleurophyllia
- Pleurophyllum
- Pleuropodia
- Pleurosiphonella
- Pleurostylina
- Plexituba
- Plicatomurus
- Plocoastraea
- Pocillopora
- Podabacia
- Podollites
- Podoseris
- Polaroplasma
- Poliphyllum
- Polyadelphia
- Polyastropsis
- Polydilasma
- Polygonaria
- Polymorphastraea
- Polyphylloseris
- Polyrophe
- Polyseries
- Polystylidium
- Polythecalis
- Polythecalloides
- Porfirieviella
- Porites
- Pourtalocyathus
- Praewentzelella
- Pragnellia
- Primitophyllum
- Priscosolenia
- Prismatophyllum
- Pristiophyllia
- Proaplophyllia
- Procladocora
- Procteria
- Procyathopora
- Procyclolites
- Prodarwinia
- Prodonacosmilia
- Progyrosmilia
- Proheliolites
- Prohexagonaria
- Proleptophyllia
- Propora
- Proporella
- Prosmilia
- Proterophyllum
- Protethmos
- Protoaulacophyllum
- Protocaninia
- Protocarcinophyllum
- Protocyathactis
- Protocyathophyllum
- Protodurhamina
- Protoheliolites
- Protoheterastrea
- Protolonsdaleiastraea
- Protomacgeea
- Protomichelinia
- Protopilophyllum
- Protopora
- Protoramulophyllum
- Protoseris
- Prototryplasma
- Protowentzellia
- Protozaphrentis
- Protrachypora
- Protrochiscolithus
- Protrochocyathus
- Provinciastraea
- Pruvostastraea
- Psammiophora
- Psammocora
- Psammocyathus
- Psammogyra
- Psammohelia
- Pseudallotropiophyllum
- Pseudamplexophyllum
- Pseudamplexus
- Pseudisastraea
- Pseudoamplexus
- Pseudoamygdalophyllum
- Pseudoblothrophyllum
- Pseudobradyphyllum
- Pseudocampophyllum
- Pseudochonophyllum
- Pseudoclaviphyllum
- Pseudocoenia
- Pseudocoeniopsis
- Pseudocryptophyllum
- Pseudocycloseris
- Pseudocystiphyllum
- Pseudodigonophyllum
- Pseudodiplocoenia
- Pseudodorlodotia
- Pseudofavia
- Pseudofavites
- Pseudofavosites
- Pseudoflecteria
- Pseudogatheria
- Pseudogrypophyllum
- Pseudoheliastraea
- Pseudohexagonaria
- Pseudohuangia
- Pseudoironealla
- Pseudomicrocroplasma
- Pseudomucophyllum
- Pseudomyriophyllia
- Pseudopavona
- Pseudopetraia
- Pseudophaulactis
- Pseudopilophyllum
- Pseudopisthophyllum
- Pseudopolythecalis
- Pseudorhabdophyllum
- Pseudoroemeria
- Pseudoroemeripora
- Pseudoromingeria
- Pseudoseris
- Pseudosiderastraea
- Pseudotimania
- Pseudotryplasma
- Pseudowannerophyllum
- Pseudoyatsengia
- Pseudozaphrentoides
- Psydracophyllum
- Pterophrentis
- Ptychophyllum
- Puanophyllum
- Puchastraea
- Pycnactis
- Pycnactoides
- Pycnolithus
- Pycnostylus
- Pyramisasteria

== Q ==
- Qianbeilites
- Qiannanophyllum
- Qinghaiphyllum
- Qinlingophyllum
- Quadratiphyllia
- Quenstedtiphyllia
- Quepora

== R ==
- Rabdastrea
- Rachaniephyllum
- Radiastrea
- Radiciphyllia
- Radiophyllum
- Ramiphyllum
- Ramulophyllum
- Recticostastraea
- Rectigrewingkia
- Redstonea
- Reimanelasma
- Reimaniphyllia
- Reimanophyllum
- Reisocyathus
- Remesia
- Remismilia
- Renirsmilia
- Rennensismilia
- Retiophyllia
- Retiophyllum
- Reuschia
- Reussangia
- Reussicoenia
- Reussiphyllia
- Reussiphyllon
- Reussopsammia
- Rhabdelasma
- Rhabdocora
- Rhabdocyclus
- Rhabdofavia
- Rhabdophyllia
- Rhabdophylliopsis
- Rhabdotetradium
- Rhacopora
- Rhaetiastraea
- Rhapidophyllum
- Rhegmaphyllum
- Rhipidogyra
- Rhipidophyllum
- Rhipidosmilia
- Rhizangia
- Rhizophylloides
- Rhizophyllum
- Rhopalophyllia
- Rhytidolasma
- Rhytidophyllum
- Ridderia
- Riphaeolites
- Rodinosmilia
- Roemeria
- Roemeripora
- Roemerolites
- Romingeria
- Rossopora
- Rotiphyllum
- Rozkowskaella
- Rozkowskia
- Rudakites
- Rukhinia
- Ryderophyllum
- Rylstonia

== S ==
- Saaremolites
- Saeptiphyllia
- Saffordophyllum
- Sagittastraea
- Sakalavastraea
- Sakalavastraeopsis
- Sakalavicyathus
- Salairia
- Salairophyllum
- Saleelasma
- Salpingium
- Saltastraea
- Salvadorea
- Sandalolitha
- Sanidophyllum
- Sapporipora
- Sarcinula
- Sassendalia
- Saucrophyllum
- Scalariogyra
- Scenophyllum
- Scharkovaelites
- Schindewolfia
- Schizophaulactis
- Schizophorites
- Schizosmilia
- Schizosmiliopsis
- Schlotheimophyllum
- Schlueteriphylum
- Schmidtilites
- Schoenophyllum
- Schreteria
- Sciophyllum
- Sclerophyllum
- Sclerosmilia
- Sclydolithus
- Scoliopora
- Scolymia
- Scruttonia
- Scyphophyllum
- Segdianophyllum
- Selenegyra
- Sematetheos
- Semeloseris
- Semidistichophyllum
- Septastrea
- Septentrionites
- Seriastraea
- Seriatopora
- Sestrophyllum
- Shansiphyllum
- Shanxipora
- Shastaphyllum
- Shensiphyllum
- Sibiriolitella
- Sibiriolites
- Siderastrea
- Siderocoenia
- Siderofungia
- Sideroseris
- Siderosmilia
- Siedleckia
- Sigelophyllum
- Sïlenocoenia
- Silesiastraea
- Siliningastraea
- Sinaimeandra
- Sinasteria
- Siniastraea
- Sinkiangopora
- Sinochlamydeophyllum
- Sinodisphyllum
- Sinopora
- Sinoporella
- Sinuosiphyllia
- Siphonodendron
- Siphonolasma
- Siphonophrentis
- Siphonophyllia
- Skolekophyllum
- Skoliophyllum
- Slimoniphyllum
- Smiloôrochus
- Smilostylia
- Smithicyathus
- Smithiphyllum
- Smythina
- Sochkineophyllum
- Sociophyllum
- Soetenia
- Sogdianophyllum
- Sokoloviella
- Solenastrea
- Solenihalysites
- Solenodendron
- Solipetra
- Somphopora
- Soshkinolites
- Sparsisolenia
- Spasskyella
- Sphenotrochopsis
- Sphenotrochus
- Spineria
- Spinophyllum
- Spirapora
- Spiroclados
- Spirophyllum
- Spissophyllum
- Spongastraea
- Spongielasma
- Spongioalveolites
- Spongonaria
- Spongophylloides
- Spongophyllum
- Spumaeolites
- Squameoalveolites
- Squameofavosites
- Squameolites
- Squameophyllum
- Squameopora
- Stauria
- Stauromatidium
- Staurophyllum
- Stelechophyllum
- Stellatophyllum
- Stelliporella
- Stelloria
- Stenocùathus
- Stephanaria
- Stephanasôrea
- Stephanaxocoenia
- Stephanaxophyllia
- Stephanocoenia
- Stephanocyathus
- Stephanophyllia
- Stephanosmilia
- Stereocoenia
- Stereocorypha
- Stereodespasophyllum
- Stereolasma
- Stereophrentis
- Stereophyllum
- Stereopsammia
- Stereostylus
- Sterictophyllum
- Stewartophyllum
- Stibastrea
- Stiboria
- Stichopsammia
- Stikineastraea
- Stilbophyllum
- Stortophyllum
- Stratophyllum
- Strephophyllum
- Streptocyathopsis
- Streptocyathus
- Streptophyllum
- Striatopora
- Striatoporella
- Stringophylloides
- Stringophyllum
- Strombodes
- Strotogyra
- Stuoresia
- Stuoresimorpha
- Stylangia
- Stylastraea
- Stylina
- Stylocoenia
- Stylocoeniella
- Stylocora
- Stylocyathus
- Stylonites
- Stylophora
- Stylophyllopsis
- Stylophyllum
- Stylopleura
- Stylopsammia
- Stylosmilia
- Stylotrochus
- Subalveolitella
- Subalveolites
- Subcaliapora
- Submesofavosites
- Substuoresis
- Subtilicyathus
- Subutaratuia
- Sudetia
- Sugiyamaella
- Sulcorphyllum
- Summiktaraea
- Sumsarophyllum
- Sunophyllum
- Sutherlandia
- Sutherlandia
- Svalbardphyllum
- Sverigophyllum
- Svetlania
- Sychnoelasma
- Symbiangia
- Symphyllia
- Symphyphyllum
- Symplectophyllum
- Synamplexoides
- Synamplexus
- Synaptophyllum
- Synastraea
- Synhelia
- Syringaxon
- Syringoalycon
- Syringocolumna
- Syringoheliolites
- Syringolites
- Syringopora
- Syringoporella
- Syringoporiella
- Syringoporinus
- Sytovaelites
- Syzygophyllia
- Szechuanophyllum

== T ==
- Tabellaephyllum
- Tabularia
- Tabulophyllum
- Tachylasma
- Tachyphyllum
- Taeniolites
- Taimyrophyllum
- Taisyakuphyllum
- Taiziheophyllum
- Tanbaella
- Taralasma
- Tarbellastraea
- Tarphyphyllum
- Tarraconogyra
- Taruphyllum
- Tatjanophyllum
- Tawuphyllum
- Taxogyra
- Tectamichelina
- Teleiophyllia
- Temnophyllum
- Tenuilasma
- Tenuiphyllum
- Tethocyathus
- Tetradium
- Tetrafossularia
- Tetralasma
- Tetraporella
- Tetraporinus
- Texastrea
- Texturiphyllum
- Thamnasteria
- Thamnasteriamorpha
- Thamnastraea
- Thamnophyllum
- Thamnopora
- Thamnoporella
- Thamnoptychia
- Thamnoseris
- Thamnosmilia
- Thamnotropis
- Thaumatolites
- Thecacristatus
- Thecactinastraea
- Thecaxon
- Thecia
- Thecipora
- Thecocyathus
- Thecomeandra
- Thecoseriopsis
- Thecoseris
- Thecosmilia
- Thecostegites
- Thololasma
- Thoulelasma
- Thuliocyclus
- Thuriantha
- Thyryptophyllum
- Thysanophyllum
- Thysanus
- Tiaradendron
- Tiarasmilia
- Timania
- Timorphyllum
- Tipheophyllum
- Tjanshanophyllum
- Toechastraea
- Tollina
- Tonkinaria
- Toquimaphyllum
- Tortoflabellum
- Tortophyllum
- Trabeculites
- Trachylasma
- Trachyphyllia
- Trachyphyllum
- Trachypsammia
- Transitolites
- Trapezophyllum
- Traskina
- Trechmannaria
- Trematotrochus
- Triadophyllum
- Tricassastraea
- Tricycloseris
- Trigerastraea
- Trigerastraeopsis
- Trigonella
- Triphyllia
- Triplophyllum
- Trocharea
- Trochiscolithus
- Trochocyathus
- Trochoidomeandra
- Trochophyllum
- Trochoplegmopsis
- Trochoseris
- Trochosmilia
- Troedssonites
- Tropiastraea
- Tropidendron
- Tropidocyathus
- Tropidophyllum
- Tropiphyllum
- Truncatocyathus
- Truncatoflabellum
- Truncicarinulum
- Truncoconus
- Trypacystiphyllum
- Tryplasma
- Tschussovskenia
- Tskanorella
- Tubicora
- Tubinacis
- Tumanophyllum
- Tumsucophyllum
- Turbinaria
- Turbinatocanina
- Turbinolia
- Turbophyllum
- Turgidiffia
- Turnacipora
- Tyrganolithes

== U ==
- Ufimia
- Ulanophyllum
- Ullernelasma
- Undaria
- Uralinia
- Uralopora
- Urceopora
- Utaratuia

== V ==
- Vacoea
- Vacuopora
- Valliculastraea
- Vallimeadra
- Vallimeandropsis
- Valliseris
- Valloria
- Variabilifavia
- Variseptophyllum
- Vaughania
- Vaughanoseris
- Vepresiphyllum
- Vepresisociophyllum
- Veraephyllum
- Verbeekiella
- Verolites
- Verrillofungia
- Vesiculophyllum
- Vesiculotubus
- Vestigiphyllum
- Victorilites
- Vielicyathus
- Viminohelia
- Visbylites
- Vischeria
- Vivesastraea
- Vojnovskija
- Volzeia

== W ==
- Waagenophyllum
- Wadeopsammia
- Wapitiphyllum
- Weiningophyllum
- Weissermelia
- Wellsotrochus
- Wenlockia
- Wentzelella
- Wentzelellites
- Wentzelloides
- Wentzelophyllum
- Wenxianophyllum
- Werneckelasma
- Wexolina
- Weyerelasma
- Wilsonastraea
- Windelasma
- Wintunastraea
- Wormsipora

== X ==
- Xenocyathellus
- Xenoemmonsia
- Xianguangia
- Xiangzhouphyllum
- Xiphelasma
- Xystrigona
- Xystriphylloides
- Xystriphyllum

== Y ==
- Yabeiphyllum
- Yacutiopora
- Yakovliella
- Yanbianophyllum
- Yaoxianopora
- Yassia
- Yatsengia
- Yavorskia
- Yishanophyllum
- Yohophyllum
- Yokoyamaella
- Yuanophylloides
- Yuanophyllum
- Yurievstiella

== Z ==
- Zakowia
- Zaphrentis
- Zaphrentites
- Zaphrentoides
- Zaphrentula
- Zaphriphyllum
- Zardinophyllum
- Zeliaphyllum
- Zelocystiphyllum
- Zelolasma
- Zelophyllia
- Zelophyllum
- Zenophilia
- Zeravschania
- Zhushanophyllum
- Zittelofungia
- Zonodigonophyllum
- Zonophyllum

== See also ==
- List of prehistoric octocorals
