= Tetrapora =

Tetrapora may refer to:

- Tetrapora (plant), a genus of flowering plants in the family Myrtaceae
- Tetrapora (bryozoan), a fossil genus of bryozoa in the family Cytididae
- Tetrapora, a genus of cnidarians in the family Tetraporellidae; synonym of Hayasakaia
