= Stephanocora =

Stephanocora is an unaccepted scientific name and may refer to two genera of corals:

- Echinopora as described by Lamarck, 1816
- Psammocora as described by Dana, 1846
