= Aulacophyllum =

Aulacophyllum may refer to:

- Aulacophyllum (plant), a synonym of Zamia, a cycad genus native to the Americas
- Aulacophyllum (coral), a prehistoric hexacoral genus
