= Cerioheterastraea =

Cerioheterastraea Temporal range: 221.5–205.6 Ma

Scientific classification
- Domain: Eukaryota
- Kingdom: Animalia
- Phylum: Cnidaria
- Class: Hexacorallia
- Order: Scleractinia
- Family: †Stylophyllidae
- Genus: †Cerioheterastraea; Cuif, 1976
- Species: †C. cerioidea

Binomial name
- †Cerioheterastraea cerioidea Cuif, 1976

Extinct genus of corals

Cerioheterastraea is an extinct genus of prehistoric stony corals in the extinct family Stylophyllidae. Species are from the Trias of China and the Russian Federation.

== See also ==
- List of prehistoric hexacoral genera
