= Cardiaphyllum =

Cardiaphyllum Temporal range: 298.9–295.5 Ma

Scientific classification
- Domain: Eukaryota
- Kingdom: Animalia
- Phylum: Cnidaria
- Subphylum: Anthozoa
- Class: †Rugosa
- Genus: †Cardiaphyllum; Wu & Zhou, 1982

Species
- †Cardiaphyllum elegans Wu et Zhou, 1982

Extinct genus of corals

Cardiaphyllum is an extinct genus of prehistoric corals. Species are found in the Upper Carboniferous (Pennsylvanian) subperiod of China.

== See also ==
- List of prehistoric hexacoral genera
