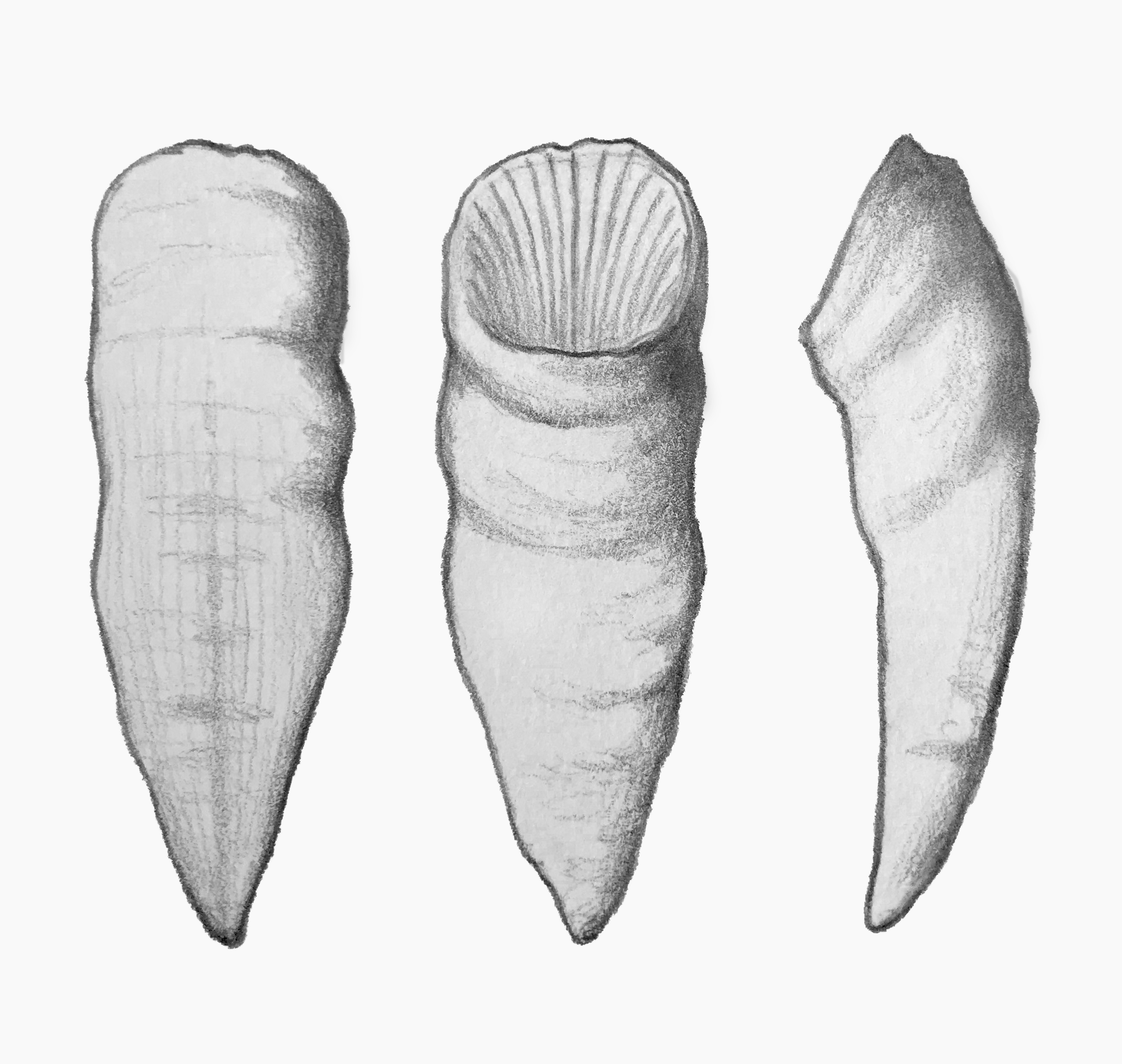
- Holophragma calceoloides shown from three different views

Scientific classification
- Domain: Eukaryota
- Kingdom: Animalia
- Phylum: Cnidaria
- Subphylum: Anthozoa
- Class: †Rugosa
- Order: †Stauriida
- Family: †Lykophyllidae
- Genus: †Holophragma
- Species: †H. calceoloides

Binomial name
- †Holophragma calceoloides Lindsröm, 1866

= Holophragma calceoloides =

Holophragma calceoloides Temporal range: Wenlock–Ludlow

Extinct species of coral

Holophragma calceoloides is an extinct species of rugose coral known from Silurian layers mainly on, but not limited to, the northwestern coast of Gotland, where it is very common. The species was recognised in 1866 by Gustaf Lindström. It was small and benthic, and always solitary.

== Etymology ==
The specific name, calceoloides comes from the word calceola that can be translated as a slipper or small shoe from Latin. This refers to the species' flat underside.

== Taxonomy ==
The species was originally named Hallia caceoloides by Gustaf Lindström in 1866, which he later changed to its current name. It was also called Pycnactis rhizophylloides by Ryder in his 1926 publication.

== Description ==
Specimens of Holophragma calceoloides are generally small, only a couple of centimeters in length. One of the sides is usually flattened, giving the coral a shoe-like shape. This side was the animals underside in life as it lived lying down. The horn is normally curved to a varying degree. The calyx is generally facing upwards, and can sometimes have a slight heart-shape. The centre septa is more distinguished than the other.
