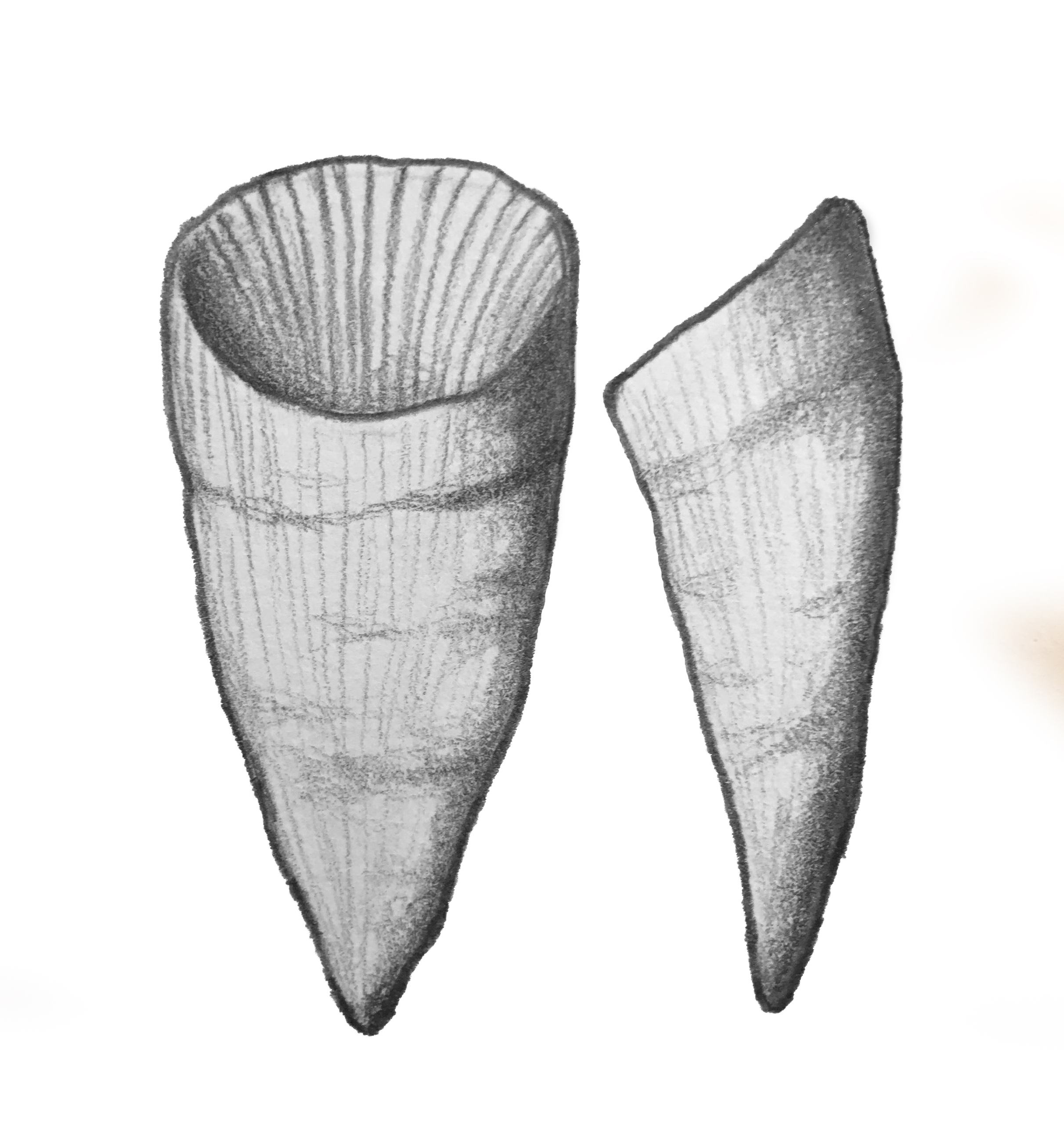
- Holophragma mitrata shown from two different views

Scientific classification
- Domain: Eukaryota
- Kingdom: Animalia
- Phylum: Cnidaria
- Subphylum: Anthozoa
- Class: †Rugosa
- Order: †Stauriida
- Family: †Lykophyllidae
- Genus: †Holophragma
- Species: †H. mitrata

Binomial name
- †Holophragma mitrata (Schlotheim, 1820)

= Holophragma mitrata =

Holophragma mitrata Temporal range: Wenlock?–Ludlow?

Extinct species of coral

Holophragma mitrata is an extinct species of rugose coral mainly known from the island of Gotland. It is horn shaped and can grow to about 40mm in length. The calyx is relatively deep and the septa runs from its ridge to the floor. The cardinal septa is not very dominant. It was described by Schlotheim in the year 1820 under the name Hippurites mitratus.
