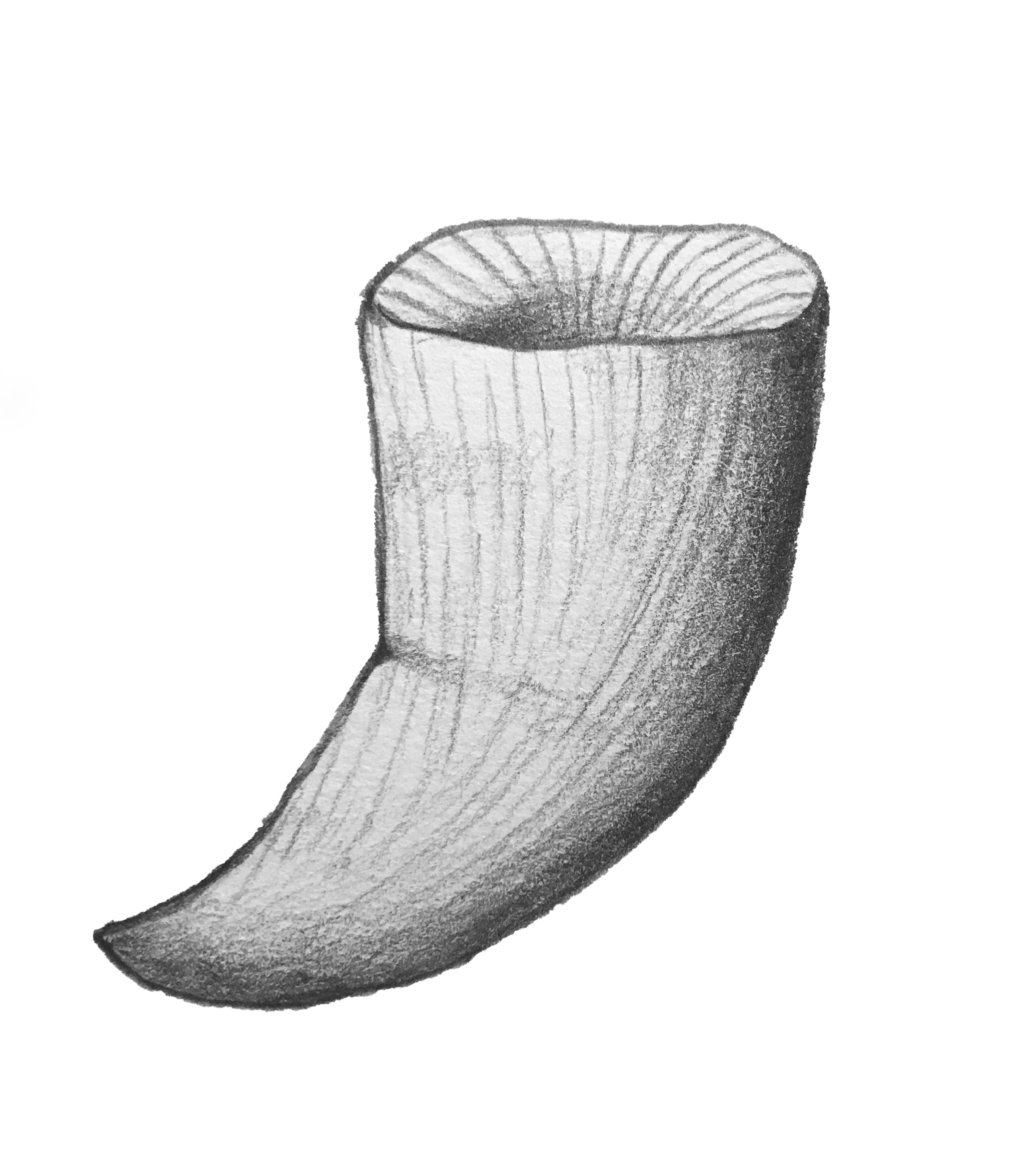

Scientific classification
- Domain: Eukaryota
- Kingdom: Animalia
- Phylum: Cnidaria
- Subphylum: Anthozoa
- Class: †Rugosa
- Order: †Stauriida
- Family: †Lykophyllidae
- Genus: †Phaulactis
- Species: †P. cyathophylloides

Binomial name
- †Phaulactis cyathophylloides Ryder, 1926

= Phaulactis cyathophylloides =

Phaulactis cyathophylloides Temporal range: Silurian

Extinct species of coral

Phaulactis cyathophylloides is an extinct species of rugose coral known from the silurian layers of Gotland, and Estonia. It is the type species of the genus Phaulactis and was described by Ryder in 1926. It can grow to relatively large sizes.

== Description ==
The species can have two different shapes, either turbinate or cylindrical. It can grow to 60 mm in length and 20 mm in diameter. The calyx is very deep and the septal ridges are well marked. As all other Phaulactis species, it has large amount of septa.
