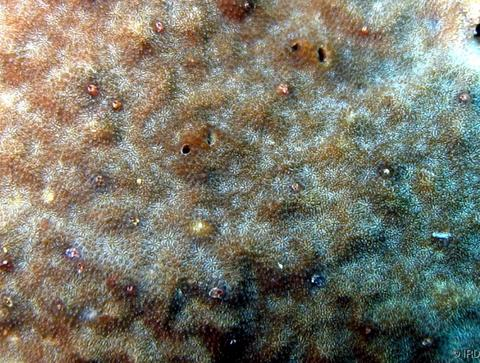

Scientific classification
- Kingdom: Animalia
- Phylum: Cnidaria
- Subphylum: Anthozoa
- Class: Hexacorallia
- Order: Scleractinia
- Family: Psammocoridae
- Genus: Psammocora
- Species: P. nierstraszi

Binomial name
- Psammocora nierstraszi Van der Horst, 1921

= Psammocora nierstraszi =

Species of coral

Psammocora nierstraszi, also called Molokai cauliflower coral, is a coral in the family Psammocoridae found in the Indo-Pacific Ocean.

== Distrubution and Habitat ==
The Psammocora nierstraszi has a vast connection with the Indo-Pacific Ocean region which connects from the Red Seaat East Africa towards the central Pacific to Hawaii and the French Polynesia. The species can be discovered within coral reef habitats with high wave advisories. The habitat description for this species is within reef environments with dense wave activity which would understand the importance of the species ecological setting. The exact amount of species can be identified in the American Samoa from the checklist of Stony Corals (Montgomery, Fenner and Toonen, 2019). The checklist can also relate to recent discoveries from various islands and reef locations across the American Samoa Pacific region. Older reports from Hawaii would also use the Psammocora nierstraszi name despite the fact that the observers would need some further information before their representing identity can be passed off as their own.The accountability for the species based on the rarity is rare considering that the description wouldn't populate the estimate amount of species within its own range.

== Description ==
The Psammocora nierstraszi consists of its own numerous colonies instead of having any dense growth forms that other corals would have. However, it does have a creative form of decent valleys that lies across the colony surface. The features of the valleys contain tall walls and iregulates the appearance of the surface. The corallites of the coral containing polyps have a wide distribution around the valleys. The primary feature consists of an outward extension of the skeletal surface that surrounds the surface which relates to its rough texture. The species would identified in various ocean environments within reefs that would also include high wave activity to ensure the ecology would be safe in dense wave conditions. Psammocora nierstraszi can vary on flexibility whether they can be exposed to light brightness Corals would be fried and bleached underneath brighter light which would therefore recommend dimmed light to preserve and conserve on Psammocora experiments.

== Differing phylogeography ==
The phylogeographic research on the Psammocora nierstraszi would rely on morphological evidence to observe species aspects within the genus. According to the Benzoni and colleagues' 2010 study which was published in the Zoological Journal of the Linnean Society, there was evidence about the similarities between morphology and molecular evidence in the Psammocora species. Relevant work is needed to retrieve information of the history of the Psammocora nierstrasziwhere similar Corals would get grouped up to different scientific names. Therefore, scientists are not able to identify certain images containing the gene flow between reefs relating to past marine events from the records provided. A thorough phylogeographic study would need relevant samples consisting of the data of ocean currents, and environmental conditions that has to do with the Psammocora species.

== Human Use ==
The human use of the Psammocora nierstraszi species has a relation to other coral reef habitats which can represent the biodiversity and to provide a broad amount of benefits to coastal communities within the marine ecology. However, it doesn't apply to the species veing vulnerable to food, and industrial aquarium supply. The coral reef systems world be volnerable to tourism, and fisheries, but those kinds of ecosystems shouldn't be factual to exploit the psammocora coral. The human activities that would impact the reef environments would rely on its own conservation especially when they don't have a harvest to implement recently. Various practices of harvesting, aquarium trade, and conservation management would be key in order to figure out of the psammocora species has an economic use for humans in life
