= Calamophylliopsis =

Calamophylliopsis Temporal range: Early Jurassic-Late Oligocene ~189–23 Ma

Scientific classification
- Kingdom: Animalia
- Phylum: Cnidaria
- Subphylum: Anthozoa
- Class: Hexacorallia
- Order: Scleractinia
- Family: †Dermosmiliidae
- Genus: †Calamophylliopsis; Alloiteau 1952

Species
- See text

Synonyms
- Cladophylliopsis Beauvais 1972

Extinct genus of corals

Calamophylliopsis is a genus of extinct stony corals. They lived from the Early Jurassic to Late Oligocene (around 189 to 23 Ma).

== Species ==
- C. cervina
- C. compacta
- C. compressa
- C. crassa
- C. elegans
- C. etalloni
- C. flabellum
- C. fotisalensis
- C. klothoensis
- C. kyrvakarensis
- C. lombricalis
- C. marini
- C. moreauana
- C. sandbergeri
- C. simonyi
- C. stockesi
- C. vidali
- C. alternicosta

== Distribution ==
Fossils of Calamophylliopsis have been registered in:

Jurassic

Azerbaijan, Bulgaria, China, Colombia (Coquina Group, La Guajira), Croatia, the Czech Republic, Ethiopia, France, Georgia, Germany, Indonesia, Iran, Morocco, Myanmar, Oman, Poland, Portugal, Romania, the Russian Federation, Serbia and Montenegro, Slovakia, Slovenia, Spain, Switzerland, Thailand, Turkmenistan, Ukraine, the United Kingdom, and Uzbekistan.

Cretaceous

Bulgaria, China, Croatia, the Czech Republic, France, Georgia, Greece, Iran, Mexico, Poland, Romania, Slovenia, Spain, Switzerland, Trinidad and Tobago, USSR, Ukraine, United States (Arizona), Uzbekistan, and Venezuela.

Paleocene

France

Eocene

Croatia

Oligocene

Slovenia

== See also ==
- List of prehistoric hexacoral genera
