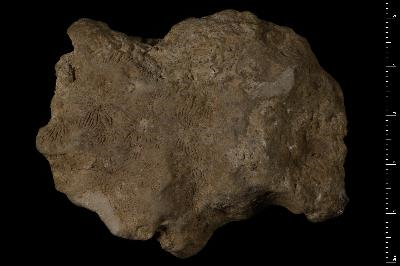
- A fossil of the Comophyllia elegans

Scientific classification
- Domain: Eukaryota
- Kingdom: Animalia
- Phylum: Cnidaria
- Class: Hexacorallia
- Order: Scleractinia
- Family: †Latomeandridae
- Genus: †Comophyllia d'Orbigny, 1849

Species
- †Comophyllia corrugata (Milne-Edwards and Haime 1849); †Comophyllia dichotoma Krkovic 1965; †Comophyllia elegans d'Orbigny, 1849 (type); †Comophyllia meandrinoides (Koby 1905); †Comophyllia ostrosi Krkovic 1965; †Comophyllia polymorpha (Koby 1905); †Comophyllia turbiformis Beauvais 1964; †Comophyllia variabilis (Koby 1886)

= Comophyllia =

Comophyllia Temporal range: 190.8–109.0 Ma

Extinct genus of corals

Comophyllia is an extinct genus of prehistoric stony corals in the family Latomeandridae. Species are known from the Jurassic and Cretaceous. C. elegans, the type species, is from the Jurassic of France.

== See also ==
- List of prehistoric hexacoral genera
