= Carinthiaphyllum =

Carinthiaphyllum Temporal range: 298.9–265.0 Ma

Scientific classification
- Kingdom: Animalia
- Phylum: Cnidaria
- Subphylum: Anthozoa
- Class: †Rugosa
- Order: †Stauriida
- Family: †Geyerophyllidae
- Genus: †Carinthiaphyllum; Heritsch, 1936

Species
- †Carinthiaphyllum bayanbulagense Guo, 1983; †Carinthiaphyllum carnicum Heritsch, 1936; †Carinthiaphyllum elegans Wu and Chao, 1979; †Carinthiaphyllum eostrotionideum Wu and Zhao; †Carinthiaphyllum grandis Guo, 1983; †Carinthiaphyllum kahleri Heritsch, 1936; †Carinthiaphyllum ramovsi Kossovaya et al., 2020; †Carinthiaphyllum subdendroidea Guo, 1983; †Carinthiaphyllum suessi Heritsch, 1936

Extinct genus of corals

Carinthiaphyllum is an extinct genus of corals in the family Geyerophyllidae. The species C. elegans is from the Carboniferous of China.

== See also ==
- List of prehistoric hexacoral genera
- Carinthia, a Land in Austria
