= Caliapora =

Caliapora Temporal range: 412.3–383.7 Ma

Scientific classification
- Domain: Eukaryota
- Kingdom: Animalia
- Phylum: Cnidaria
- Subphylum: Anthozoa
- Class: †Tabulata
- Family: †Alveolitidae
- Subfamily: †Caliaporinae
- Genus: †Caliapora; Schlüter, 1889

Species
- †Caliapora battersbyi; †Caliapora chaetetoides; †Caliapora dubatolovi; †Caliapora elegans (Yanet); †Caliapora germanicus; †Caliapora graciosa; †Caliapora kerneri; †Caliapora macropora; †Caliapora motomensis; †Caliapora primitiva; †Caliapora prisca; †Caliapora pseudoprimitiva; †Caliapora robusta; †Caliapora taltiensis; †Caliapora uralica; †Caliapora venusta

Extinct genus of corals

Caliapora is an extinct genus of corals from the Devonian.

== See also ==
- List of prehistoric hexacoral genera
