= Codonosmilia =

Codonosmilia Temporal range: 168.3–161.2 Ma

Scientific classification
- Domain: Eukaryota
- Kingdom: Animalia
- Phylum: Cnidaria
- Class: Hexacorallia
- Order: Scleractinia
- Family: †Rhipidogyridae
- Genus: †Codonosmilia; Koby, 1888
- Species: †C. elegans

Binomial name
- †Codonosmilia elegans Koby 1888

Extinct genus of corals

Codonosmilia is an extinct genus of stony corals. It is monotypic, containing only the species Conodosmilia elegans.

== See also ==
- List of prehistoric hexacoral genera
