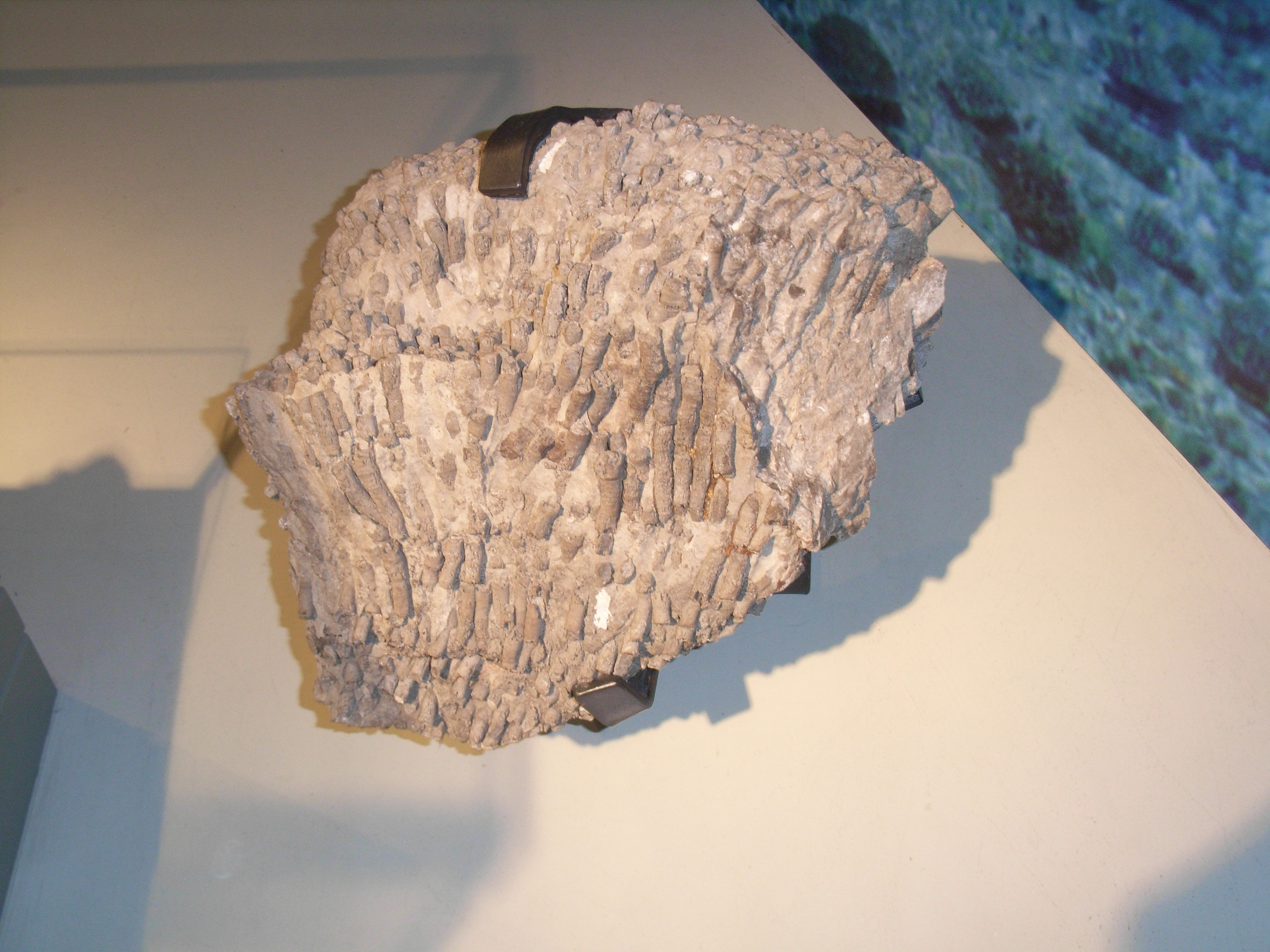
- Siphonodendron sp. from Snook Point, Northumberland, UK

Scientific classification
- Domain: Eukaryota
- Kingdom: Animalia
- Phylum: Cnidaria
- Subphylum: Anthozoa
- Class: †Rugosa
- Family: †Lithostrotionidae
- Genus: †Siphonodendron; McCoy 1849

Species
- †S. irregulare †S. junceum †S. martini †S. pauciradiale †S. scaleberense

= Siphonodendron =

Extinct genus of corals

Siphonodendron is an extinct genus of colonial rugose corals common during the Carboniferous period. In fossil form it now appears as a white or brown mass of short spaghetti-like threads, usually flattened during distortion of the embedding limestone. It is in the sub-class Hexacorallia of corals with sixfold symmetry.

== See also ==
- List of prehistoric hexacorals
