= Calamophylliopsis elegans =

Calamophylliopsis elegans Temporal range: 125.45–99.7 Ma

Scientific classification
- Domain: Eukaryota
- Kingdom: Animalia
- Phylum: Cnidaria
- Subphylum: Anthozoa
- Class: Hexacorallia
- Order: Scleractinia
- Family: †Dermosmiliidae
- Genus: †Calamophylliopsis
- Species: †C. elegans

Binomial name
- †Calamophylliopsis elegans He and Xiao 1990

Extinct coral species

Calamophylliopsis elegans is an extinct species of hexacorals. It is found only at Sainpug, Gegyai, Tibet Autonomous Region (Cretaceous of China).
