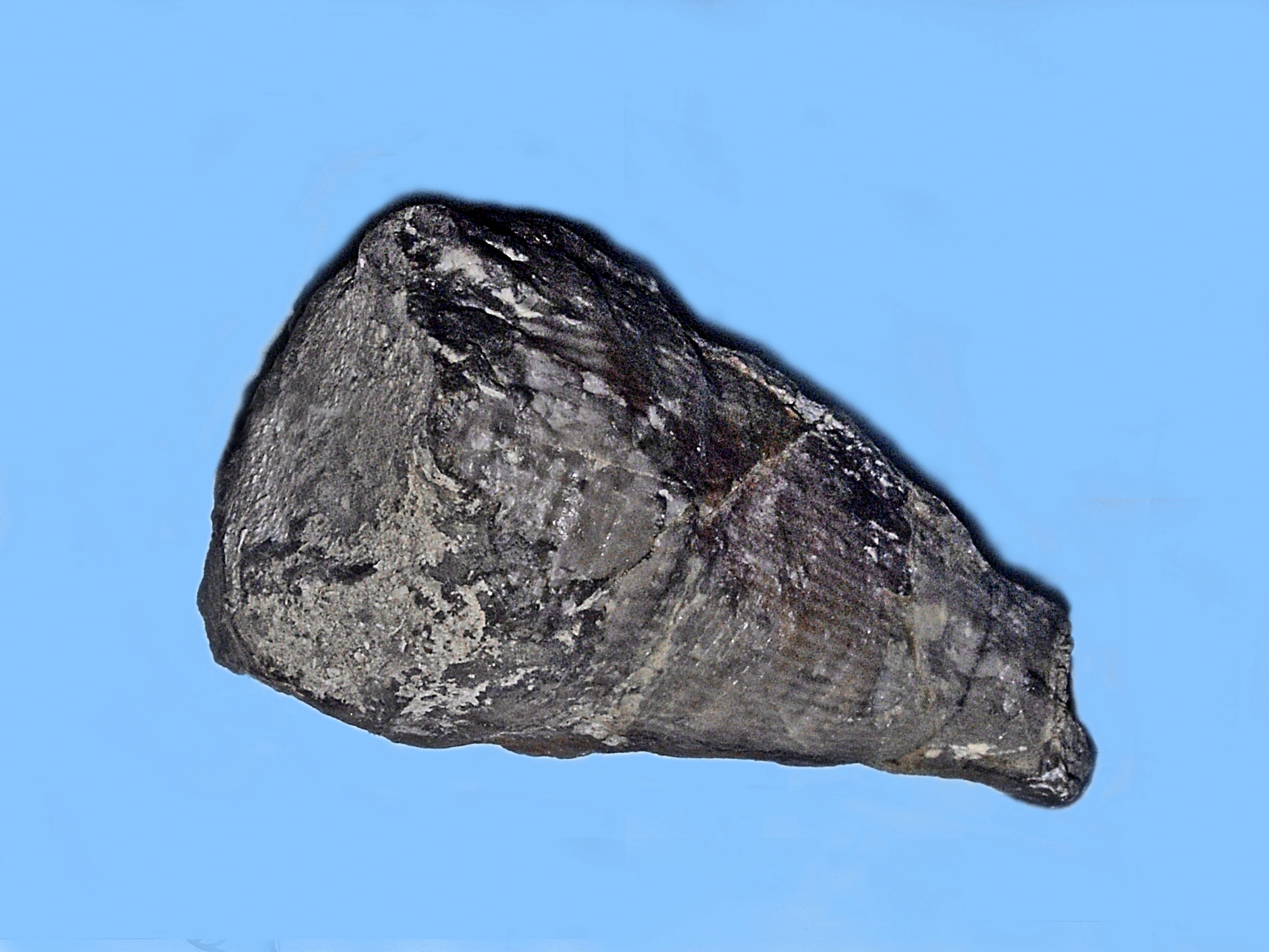
- Pseudoamplexus from Lower Devonian of Coglians

Scientific classification
- Kingdom: Animalia
- Phylum: Cnidaria
- Subphylum: Anthozoa
- Class: †Rugosa
- Genus: †Pseudoamplexus; Smyshlyaeva 1948

= Pseudoamplexus =

Pseudoamplexus Temporal range: 439–391.9 Ma Devonian–Silurian

Extinct genus of corals

Pseudoamplexus is an extinct genus of horn corals belonging to the order Rugosa.

== Fossil record ==
Fossils of Pseudoamplexus are found in marine strata from the Devonian to the Silurian (age range: from 439.0 to 391.9 million years ago.). Fossils are known from the Czech Republic, Italy, Russia, Tajikistan, United States and China.

== Description ==
Pseudoamplexus has a unique horn-shaped chamber with a wrinkled wall. These corals have a bilateral symmetry, with a skeleton made of calcite and divided by horizontal plates. They lived on the sea floor, in reef and in shallow subtidal waters.
