= Rhipidogyridae =

Rhipidogyridae Temporal range: 171.6–present Ma

Scientific classification
- Domain: Eukaryota
- Kingdom: Animalia
- Phylum: Cnidaria
- Subphylum: Anthozoa
- Class: Hexacorallia
- Order: Scleractinia
- Family: †Rhipidogyridae; Koby, 1905

Subfamilies
- Aplosmiliinae Geyer 1955; Pruvostastraea Alloiteau 1957; Rhipidogyrinae Koby 1905

Synonyms
- List: Diplothecophyllia Alloiteau 1952; Dichocaeniopsis Alloiteau 1957; Placogyropsis Alloiteau 1957; Tskhanarella Sikharulidze 1979; Saxuligyra Eliasova 1991

Extinct family of corals

Rhipidogyridae is an extinct family of stony corals (hexacorals).

== Overview of genera ==
- †Barysmilia Milne-Edwards & Haime 1848
- †Bodeurina Beauvais 1980
- †Codonosmilia Koby 1888
- †Cymosmilia Koby 1894
- †Ironella Krasnov & Starostina, 1970
- †Orbignygyra Alloiteau 1952
- †Paraacanthogyra Morycowa and Marcopoulou-Diacantoni 1997
- †Phytogyra d'Orbigny 1849
- †Placohelia Pocta 1887
- †Psammogyra Fromentel 1862
- †Pseudoironella Sikharulidze 1979
- †Psilogyra Felix 1903
- †Rhipidosmilia Geyer 1955
- †Saltocyathus Morycowa & Masse 1998
- †Somalica Parona and Zuffardi-Comerci 1931
- †Tiaradendron Quenstedt 1857
