= Zeravschania =

Scientific classification
- Kingdom: Plantae
- Clade: Tracheophytes
- Clade: Angiosperms
- Clade: Eudicots
- Clade: Asterids
- Order: Apiales
- Family: Apiaceae
- Subfamily: Apioideae
- Tribe: Pimpinelleae
- Genus: Zeravschania; Korovin

Genus of flowering plants

Zeravschania is a genus of flowering plants belonging to the family Apiaceae.

Its native range is Caucasus to Central Asia and Pakistan.

Species:

- Zeravschania aucheri (Boiss.) Pimenov
- Zeravschania ferulifolia (Gilli) Pimenov
