= Hallia =

Hallia is a taxonomic synonym that may refer to:

- Hallia J.St.-Hil. = Alysicarpus
- Hallia Thunb. = Psoralea
