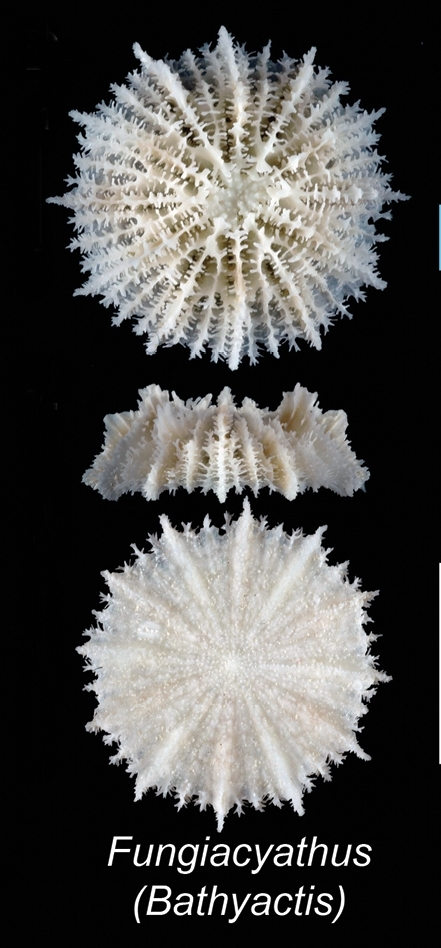
- Fungiacyathus (bathyactis) variegatus

Scientific classification
- Domain: Eukaryota
- Kingdom: Animalia
- Phylum: Cnidaria
- Class: Hexacorallia
- Order: Scleractinia
- Family: Fungiacyathidae
- Genus: Fungiacyathus; Sars, 1872

= Fungiacyathus =

Genus of corals

Fungiacyathus is a genus of corals belonging to the monotypic family Fungiacyathidae.

Subgenus:

- Fungiacyathus (Bathyactis) Durègne, 1886
  - Fungiacyathus crispus (Pourtalès, 1871)
  - Fungiacyathus dennanti Cairns & Parker, 1992
  - Fungiacyathus fissidiscus Cairns & Zibrowius, 1997
  - ...
