= Thamnoseris =

Scientific classification
- Kingdom: Animalia
- Phylum: Cnidaria
- Subphylum: Anthozoa
- Class: Hexacorallia
- Order: Scleractinia
- Family: †Latomeandridae
- Genus: †Thamnoseris; Fromentel, 1861

Extinct genus of stony corals

Thamnoseris is an extinct genus of stony corals in the family Latomeandridae.
