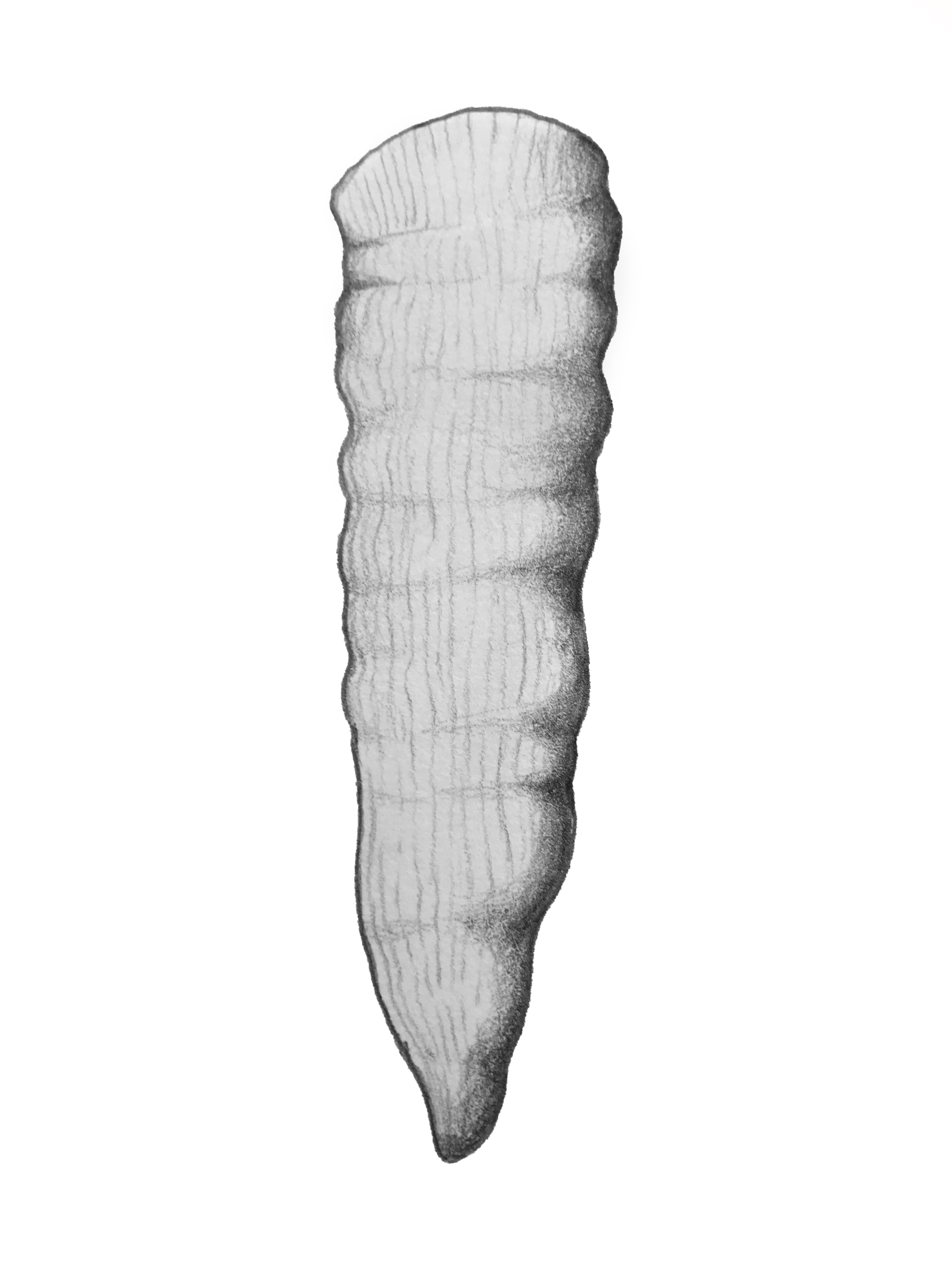
- Phaulactis angusta

Scientific classification
- Domain: Eukaryota
- Kingdom: Animalia
- Phylum: Cnidaria
- Subphylum: Anthozoa
- Class: †Rugosa
- Order: †Stauriida
- Family: †Lykophyllidae
- Genus: †Phaulactis; Ryder, 1926

Species
- See list of Phaulactis species

= Phaulactis =

Phaulactis Temporal range: Ordovician-Devonian

Extinct genus of corals

Phaulactis is an extinct genus of rugose coral that existed during the Ordovician, Silurian and Devonian periods. It can be found in Europe, North America, Asia and Australia. Phaulactis was described by Ryder in 1926.

== Description ==
All members of this genus are horn-shaped solitary corals, although the exact shape can vary between species. Phaulactis is most easily identified by its large amount of septa, deep calyx and distinct internal structure with three clear areas with different properties (but these sections are not always present in younger individuals). Another common trait is clear septal ridges.

== Species ==
- Phaulactis angelini Wedekind, 1927
- Phaulactis angusta Lonndsdale, 1839
- Phaulactis clarkei Wedekind, 1927
- Phaulactis cyathophylloides Ryder, 1926
- Phaulactis gracile Wedekind, 1927
- Phaulactis högklinti Wedekind 1927
- Phaulactis iregularis Wedekind, 1927
- Phaulactis tabulatum Wedekind, 1927
- Phaulactis trochiformis McCoy, 1850
- Phaulactis variabilis Kato et Ezaki, 1986
