= Pachyseris =

Scientific classification
- Domain: Eukaryota
- Kingdom: Animalia
- Phylum: Cnidaria
- Subphylum: Anthozoa
- Class: Hexacorallia
- Order: Scleractinia
- Family: Agariciidae
- Genus: Pachyseris; Milne Edwards & Haime, 1849

Genus of corals

Pachyseris is a genus of cnidarians belonging to the family Agariciidae.

The genus has almost cosmopolitan distribution.

== Species ==
Species:

- Pachyseris affinis Duncan, 1880
- Pachyseris compacta Umbgrove, 1950
- Pachyseris cristata Martin, 1880
