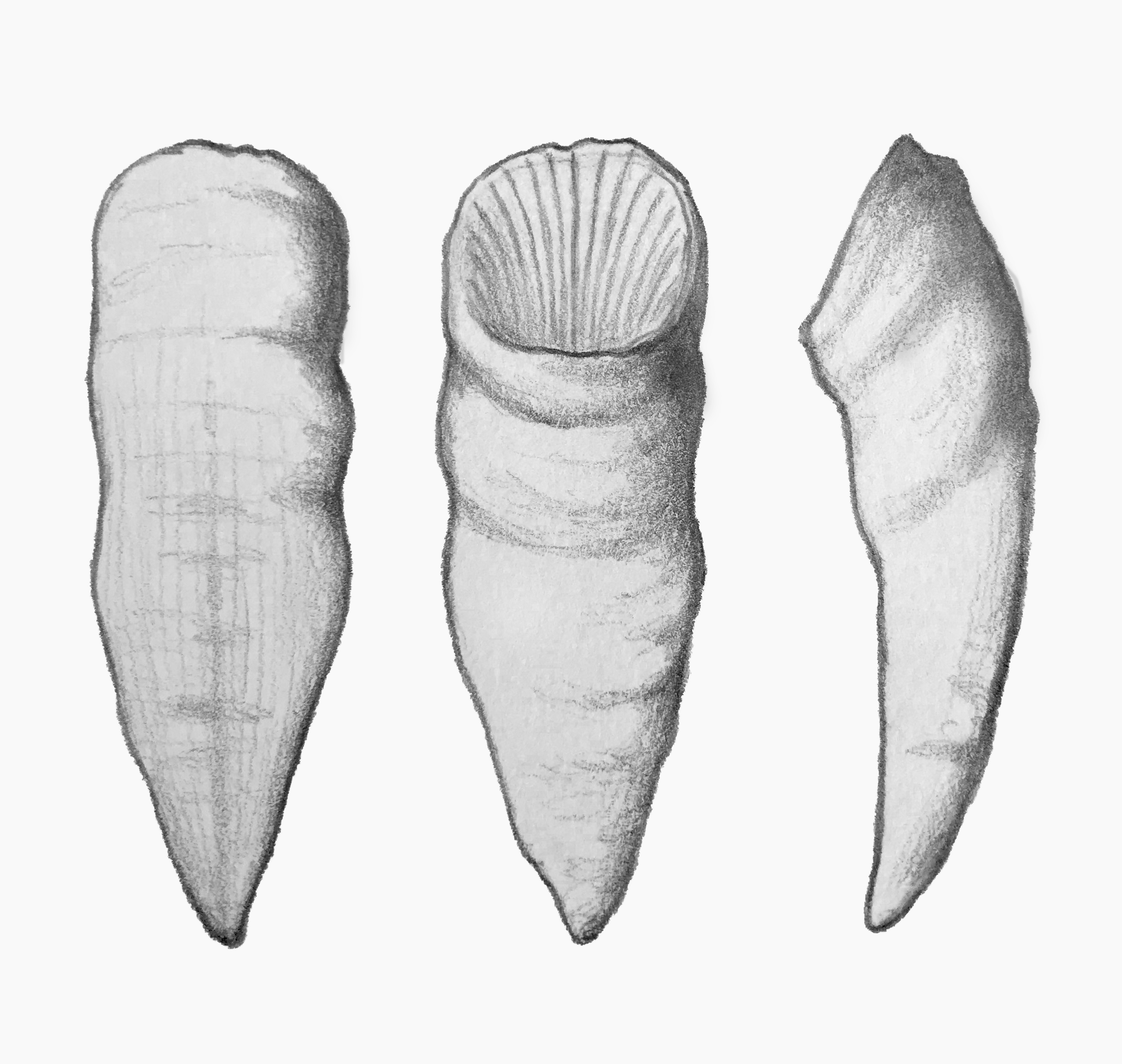
- Holophragma calceoloides

Scientific classification
- Domain: Eukaryota
- Kingdom: Animalia
- Phylum: Cnidaria
- Subphylum: Anthozoa
- Class: †Rugosa
- Order: †Stauriida
- Family: †Lykophyllidae
- Genus: †Holophragma; Lindström, 1896

Species
- See list of Holophragma species

= Holophragma =

Holophragma Temporal range: Ordovician–Silurian

Extinct genus of corals

Holophragma is an extinct genus of rugose coral known from Ordovician and Silurian rocks in Scandinavia, Russia, Australia and the United States. Two of its species can be found on the northwestern coast of Gotland, where it is one of the most common fossil genera. It was described by Gustaf Lindström in the year 1896. The genus contains two species.

== Description ==
Members of the genus Holophraga are small shoe- or horn-shaped corals. They usually lived on their side, with their calyx pointing upwards. H. calceoloides has a distinct cardinal septa, while H. mitrata does not.

== Species ==
- Holophragma calceoloides Lindström, 1866
- Holophragma mitrata Schlotheim, 1820
