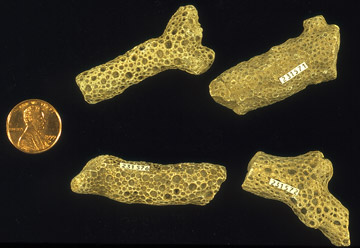
- Thamnoporella from the Bethany Falls Limestone Member, Swope Limestone in Labette County, Kansas

Scientific classification
- Kingdom: Animalia
- Phylum: Cnidaria
- Subphylum: Anthozoa
- Class: †Tabulata
- Family: †Pachyporidae
- Genus: †Thamnoporella; Sokolov 1955

= Thamnoporella =

Thamnoporella Temporal range: Pennsylvanian

Extinct genus of corals

Thamnoporella is an extinct genus of tabulate corals.
