= Hayasakaia =

Scientific classification
- Domain: Eukaryota
- Kingdom: Animalia
- Phylum: Cnidaria
- Subphylum: Anthozoa
- Order: incertae sedis
- Family: Tetraporellidae
- Genus: Hayasakaia; Lang, Smith & Thomas, 1940

Synonyms
- Tetrapora Yabe & Hayasaka, 1915

Genus of aquatic animals

Hayasakaia is a genus of cnidarians belonging to the family Tetraporellidae.

The species of this genus are found in Southeastern Asia.

Species:

- Hayasakaia cystosa Linnaeus, 1958
- Hayasakaia fasciacerioformis Yang, 1978
