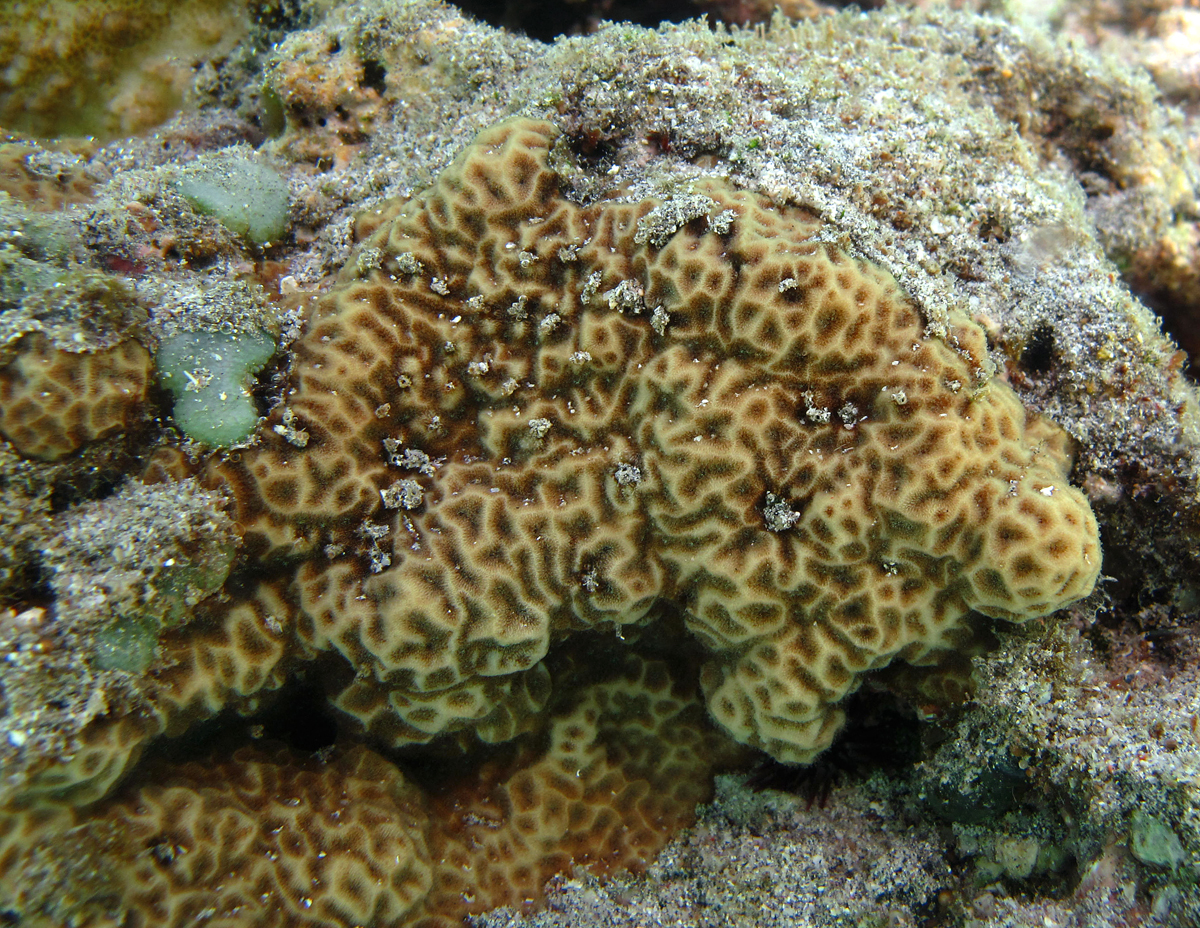
- Psammocora profundacella

Scientific classification
- Domain: Eukaryota
- Kingdom: Animalia
- Phylum: Cnidaria
- Subphylum: Anthozoa
- Class: Hexacorallia
- Order: Scleractinia
- Family: Psammocoridae; Chevalier & Beauvais, 1987
- Genus: Psammocora; Dana, 1846

Species
- See text

Synonyms
- (Genus): Stephanaria Verrill, 1867; Stephanocora Verrill, 1866

= Psammocora =

Genus of corals

Psammocora is a genus of stony coral in the monotypic family Psammocoridae. Species of this genus are also known as cat's paw coral.

== Species ==
- Psammocora albopicta Benzoni, 2006
- Psammocora contigua (Esper, 1794)
- Psammocora digitata Milne Edwards & Haime, 1851
- Psammocora eldredgei Randall, 2015
- Psammocora haimiana Milne Edwards & Haime, 1851
- Psammocora nierstraszi Van der Horst, 1921
- Psammocora profundacella Gardiner, 1898
- Psammocora stellata (Verrill, 1866)
