= Charlie–Gibbs fracture zone =

Oceanic feature on the Mid-Atlantic Ridge

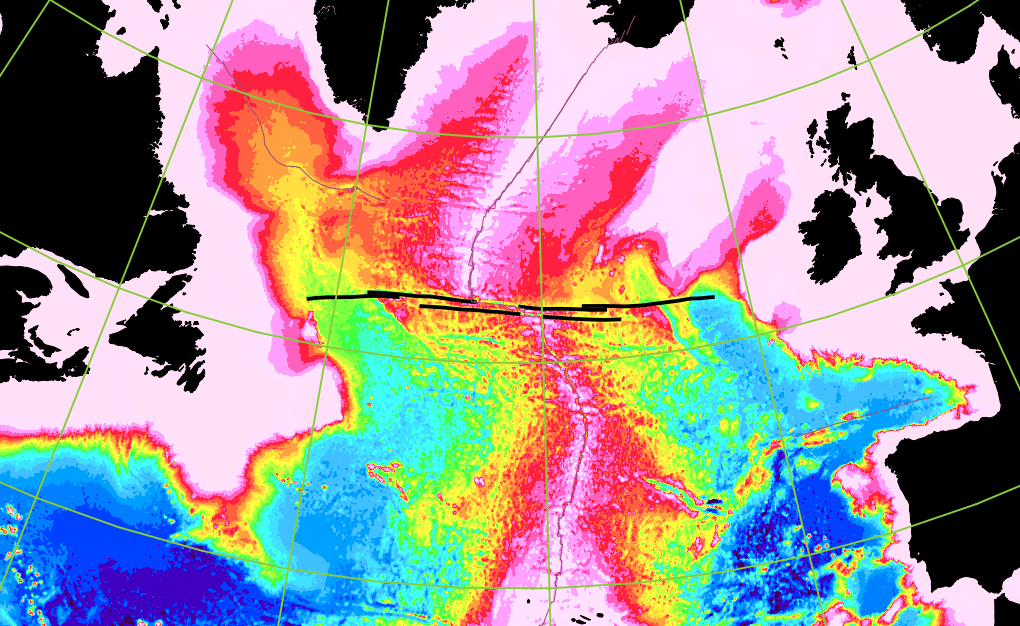
Charlie–Gibbs fracture zone, full extent

Schematic overview of Charlie–Gibbs fracture zone

Charlie–Gibbs transform fault

Charlie–Gibbs fracture zone is a system of two parallel fracture zones. It is the most prominent interruption of the Mid-Atlantic Ridge between the Azores and Iceland, with the longest faults in the North Atlantic, and is ecologically an important biosystems boundary. It can be traced over more than 2,000 kilometres (1,200 mi), from north-east of Newfoundland to south-west of Ireland. It took 90 million years for the fault to grow to this length.

== Structure ==
The transform fault of the southern fracture zone displaces the Mid-Atlantic Ridge, coming from the Azores triple junction, to the west over a distance of 120 km (75 mi). At longitude 31.75W a south to north seismically active rift valley with a length of 40 km (25 mi) connects the western end of the southern transform to the eastern end of the northern transform, sometimes called an intra-transform spreading centre. The northern transform fault displaces the spreading ridge over another 230 km (140 mi) to the west before it connects to the northern part of the Mid-Atlantic Ridge going to Iceland. Thus these, the longest faults under the Atlantic Ocean have a total offset of the system of over 340 km (210 mi). The northern rift mountains of the fracture zone are higher than those in the south, as part of a geological transition in the North Atlantic sea floor which is higher to the north of the fracture zone.

Both transform faults continue eastward and westward as inactive fracture zones. The Charlie–Gibbs fracture zone has large amounts of mid-ocean ridge igneous and metamorphic rocks. At the eastern termination off shore of Newfoundland there is an igneous province found within the otherwise nonvolcanic rifted margin in the region of transition between oceanic and continental crust.

== Exploration ==
In 1963 the existence of a transform fault near latitude 53N was first postulated on the basis of earthquake epicenter data by Bruce Heezen and Maurice Ewing. A study of ocean currents also indicated that there should be a deep passage through the Mid-Atlantic Ridge. In 1966 the area was investigated by USCGC Spar (WLB-403) on its return from an Arctic survey. The fault was named Charlie fracture zone after the USCG Ocean Weather Station Charlie at 52°45′N 35°30′W, athwart the fault. In July 1968 USNS Josiah Willard Gibbs (T-AGOR-1) conducted a more extended survey. It was proposed that the fracture zone be renamed Gibbs fracture zone, as fracture zones are generally named for research vessels. The proposal was accepted only in part, and currently the official name is Charlie–Gibbs fracture zone. Note that the double name refers to the two parallel fracture zones together. The individual fracture zones have to be referred to as Charlie–Gibbs North and South.

Recent studies have been carried out by the RV Akademik Nikolay Strakhov, and the Tectonic Ocean Spreading at the Charlie–Gibbs fracture zone (TOSCA) survey by a remote vehicle.

== Seamounts ==
The transform area contains two named seamounts:

- Minia Seamount at 53°01′N 34°58′W. It is located inside the corner of the northern branch of the Mid-Atlantic Ridge and the northern transform fault. This seamount is named after the CS Minia (1866–1922) of the Anglo-American Telegraph Company. The Minia is known for recovering bodies and artifacts from the Titanic.
- Hecate Seamount at 52°17′N 31°00′W, named after HMS Hecate (A137). It is located on the northern wall of the southern transform fault east of the short spreading ridge.

Fourteen seamounts are buried under sediments at the eastern end of fracture zone.

== Protected area ==
The Charlie–Gibbs Marine Protected Area is a conservation area in the Charlie–Gibbs fracture zone in North Atlantic international waters.

== Ecology ==
The North Atlantic Current flows at the surface from east to west over the area of the fracture zone and with the route of the Atlantic Deep Western Boundary Current along the fracture zone and through the barrier of the Mid-Atlantic Ridge, this results in two different water masses to the north and south of the zone. The subarctic intermediate water is brought in by the higher eastward flow, resulting in the freshest, high nutrient Labrador Sea Water occurring between 1–1.5 km (0.62–0.93 mi) depth. Deeper than 2 km (1.2 mi) along the fracture zone the water mass originates from the Iceland–Scotland Ridge in the form of the Faroe-Bank Channel overflow with a fair load of organic material and is driven west through the fracture zone by the boundary current.

The seafloor contains many corals including reef forming stony corals such as Madrepora oculata and octocorals. Coral species separate from reefs including Desmophyllum, Solenosmilia variabilis and Madrepora oculata have been described. Also found are Demosponge and Hexactinellid sponges, sea lilies, and sea cucumbers In all at least 309 species have been characterised to date making for a very diverse seafloor ecosystem. Overall, Xenophyophorea are dominant, being about twice as common as sea lilies, Bathycrinidae, Bryozoa, Demosponges or sea cucumbers. The highest seafloor biodiversity have been reported at depths of 1.5–2.2 km (0.93–1.37 mi) in areas of bedrock and steeper slopes. In the past, extensive Orange roughy fisheries were in the area but over exploitation were one of the factors that resulted in the establishment of a protected area. During 2018 studies at Hecate Seamount, Orange roughy was observed. This very long lived species (over 250 years) can take considerable time to recover from overfishing as it does not reproduce every year.
