= Paraconotrochus capense =

Scientific classification
- Kingdom: Animalia
- Phylum: Cnidaria
- Subphylum: Anthozoa
- Class: Hexacorallia
- Order: Scleractinia
- Family: Caryophylliidae
- Genus: Paraconotrochus
- Species: P. capense

Binomial name
- Paraconotrochus capense (Gardiner, 1904)

Synonyms
- Caryophyllia capensis Gardiner, 1904; Duncania capense Gardiner, 1904

Species of coral

Paraconotrochus capense is a stony coral in the family Caryophylliidae. The scientific name of this species was first published in 1904 by Gardiner.
