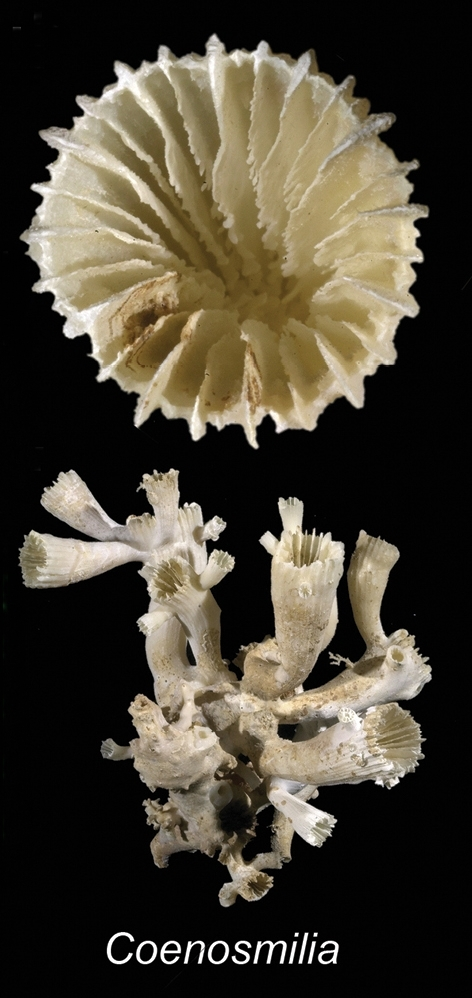
- Coenosmilia arbuscula

Scientific classification
- Kingdom: Animalia
- Phylum: Cnidaria
- Subphylum: Anthozoa
- Class: Hexacorallia
- Order: Scleractinia
- Family: Caryophylliidae
- Genus: Coenosmilia; Pourtalès, 1874

Species
- See text

= Coenosmilia =

Genus of corals in the family Caryophylliidae

Coenosmilia is a genus of small corals in the family Caryophylliidae.

== Species ==
The World Register of Marine Species includes the following species in the genus :

- Coenosmilia arbuscula Pourtalès, 1874
- Coenosmilia inordinata Cairns, 1984
