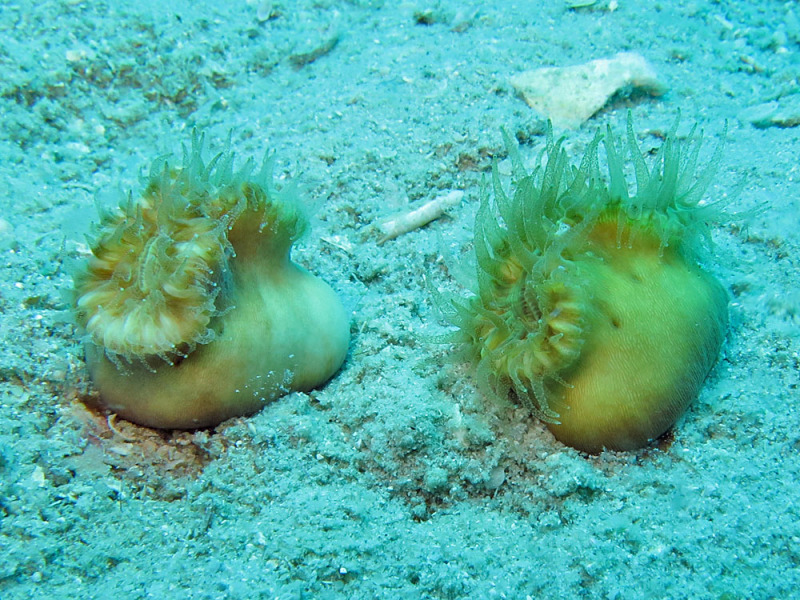
- Heteropsammia cochlea

Scientific classification
- Kingdom: Animalia
- Phylum: Cnidaria
- Subphylum: Anthozoa
- Class: Hexacorallia
- Order: Scleractinia
- Family: Dendrophylliidae
- Genus: Heteropsammia; Edwards & Haime, 1848

= Heteropsammia =

Genus of corals

Heteropsammia is a genus of apozooxanthellate corals that belong to the family Dendrophylliidae.

== Anatomy ==
These corals consist of free-living, single polyps, of a diameter of around 2.5 cm. They form a symbiotic relationship with a sipunculid worm, Aspidosiphon corallicola. The worm lives in a cavity situated on the under surface of the coral and it pulls the polyp over sandy substrates. They also present a facultative symbiotic relationship with zooxanthellae of the Symbiodinium genus, as this link has been observed at shallow waters (under 40 m), but not at greater depths (where the corals live without the algae). Heteropsammia corals can sometimes establish symbiotic relationships with other marine species, such as hermit crabs, that live in the cavity where the endosymbiotic Sipunculid worm is usually located.

== Feeding ==
Heteropsammia corals (of the species Heteropsammia cochlea) are able to consume larger prey (relative to their mouth opening) such as salps, using the large "gape" of the surrounding oral disc to capture these prey items.

== Species ==
The following species are listed in the World Register of Marine Species (WoRMS):

- Heteropsammia cochlea Spengler, 1781
- Heteropsammia eupsammides Gray, 1849
- Heteropsammia moretonensis Wells, 1964
