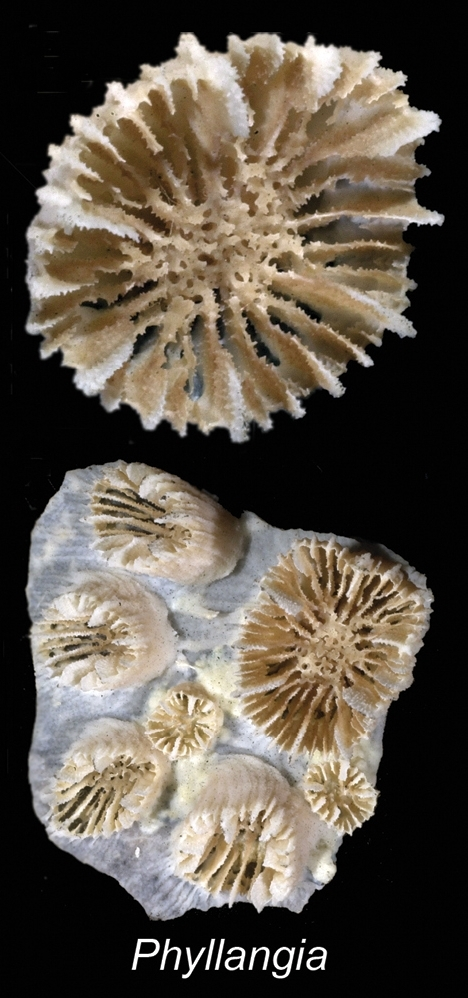

Conservation status
- Apparently Secure (NatureServe)
- CITES Appendix III

Scientific classification
- Kingdom: Animalia
- Phylum: Cnidaria
- Subphylum: Anthozoa
- Class: Hexacorallia
- Order: Scleractinia
- Family: Caryophylliidae
- Genus: Phyllangia
- Species: P. americana

Binomial name
- Phyllangia americana Milne-Edwards & Haime, 1849

Synonyms
- Phyllangia fuegoensis Squires, 1963

= Phyllangia americana =

Species of coral

Phyllangia americana is a reef coral species from the family Caryophylliidae. The scientific name of the species was first published in 1849 by Milne-Edwards & Haime.

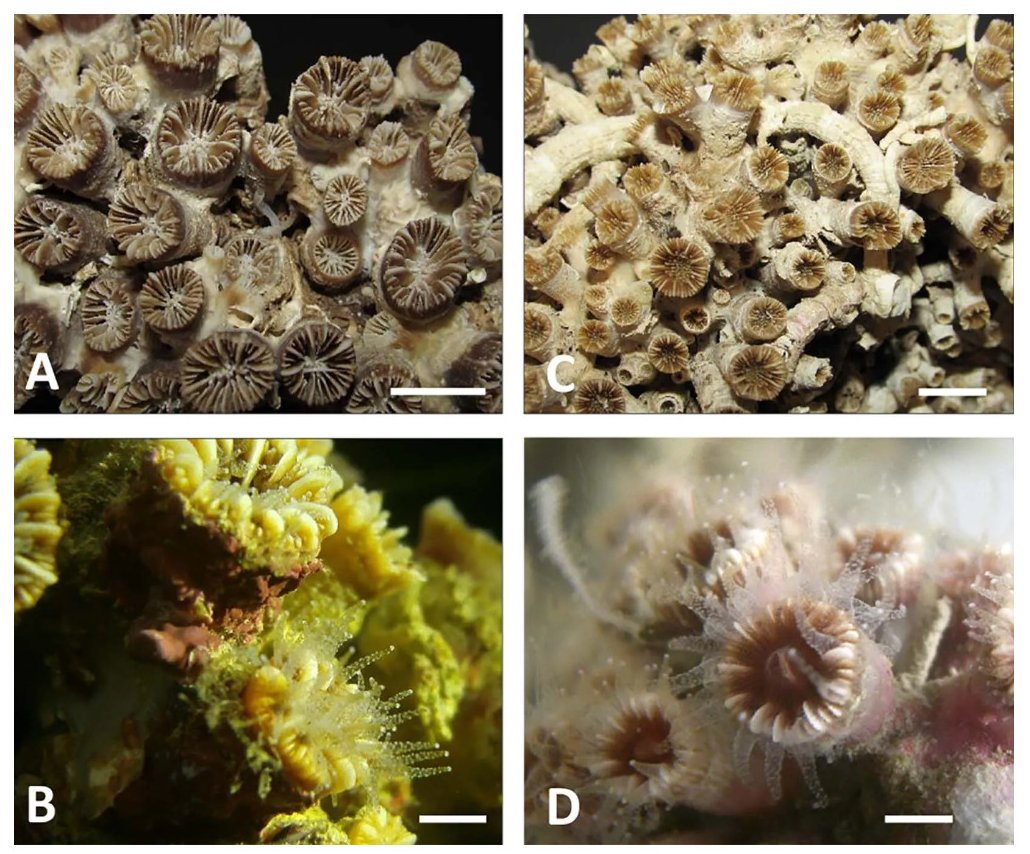
Bleached and in vivo coral colonies of Phyllangia americana mouchezii (left column: A,B). Scale bars: A, C = 1 cm; B, D = 0.5 cm.
