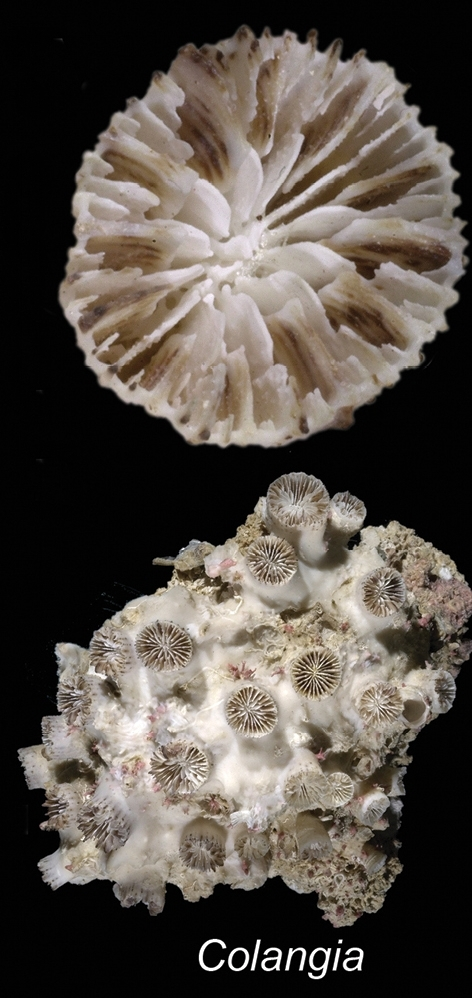
- Colangia immersa

Scientific classification
- Kingdom: Animalia
- Phylum: Cnidaria
- Subphylum: Anthozoa
- Class: Hexacorallia
- Order: Scleractinia
- Family: Caryophylliidae
- Genus: Colangia; Pourtalès, 1871

Species
- See text

= Colangia =

Genus of small corals

Colangia is a genus of small corals in the family Caryophylliidae.

== Species ==
The World Register of Marine Species includes the following species in the genus:

- Colangia immersa Pourtalès, 1871
- Colangia jamaicaensis Cairns, 2000
- Colangia moseleyi (Faustino, 1927)
- Colangia multipalifera Cairns, 2000
