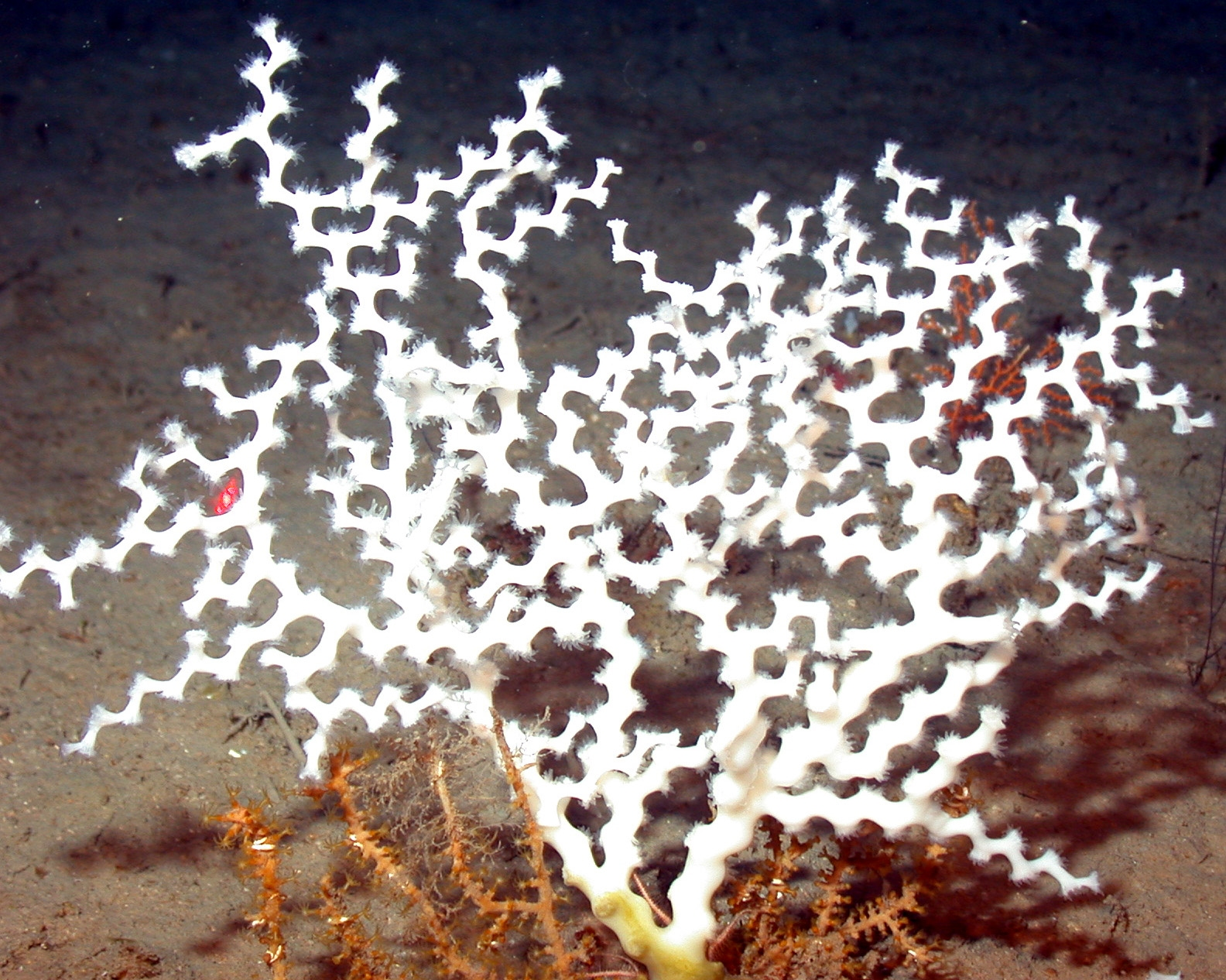

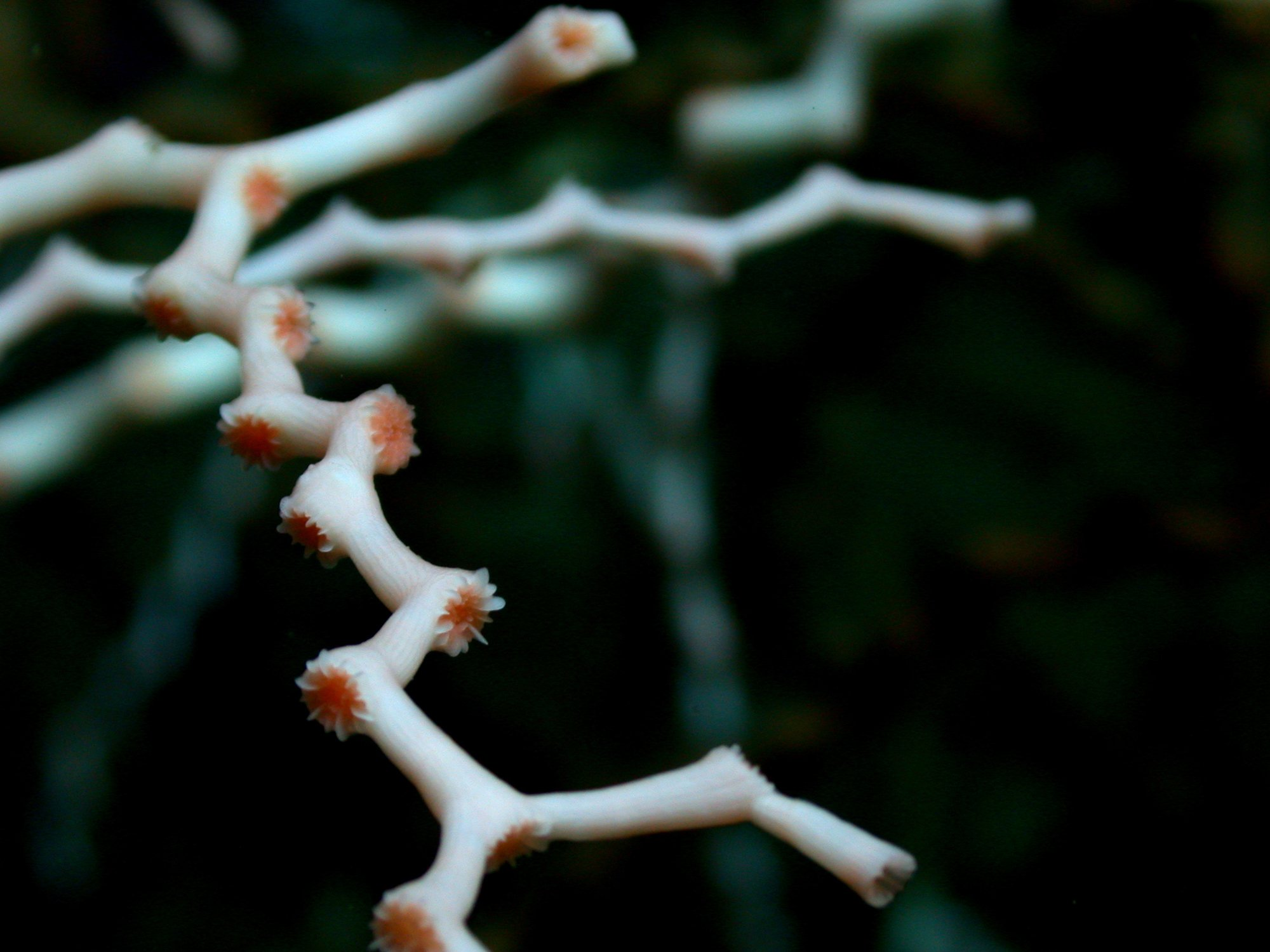

Conservation status
- Endangered (IUCN 3.1) (Mediterranean)

- Declining (NZ TCS)

Scientific classification
- Kingdom: Animalia
- Phylum: Cnidaria
- Subphylum: Anthozoa
- Class: Hexacorallia
- Order: Scleractinia
- Family: Oculinidae
- Genus: Madrepora
- Species: M. oculata

Binomial name
- Madrepora oculata Linnaeus, 1758

Synonyms
- List: Amphihelia moresbyi Alcock, 1898; Cyathohelia formosa Alcock, 1898; Lophohelia investigatoris Alcock, 1898; Lophohelia tenuis Moseley, 1881; Madrepora alcocki Faustino, 1927; Madrepora candida (Moseley, 1881); Madrepora kauaiensis Vaughan, 1907; Madrepora tenuis (Moseley, 1881); Madrepora venusta Milne Edwards & Haime, 1850; Madrepora vitiae Squires & Keyes, 1967

= Madrepora oculata =

Species of coral

Madrepora oculata, also called zigzag coral, is a stony coral that is found worldwide outside of the polar regions, growing in deep water at depths of 50 to at least 1500 meters. It was first described by Carl Linnaeus in his landmark 1758 10th edition of Systema Naturae. It is one of only 12 species of coral that are found worldwide, including in Subantarctic oceans. In some areas, such as in the Mediterranean Sea and the Northeast Atlantic Ocean, it dominates communities of coral. Due to their similar distribution and taxonomic relationship, M. oculata is often experimentally compared to related deep sea coral, Lophelia pertusa.

== Description ==
The species is quite variable in its tendency to branch, its texture, and its color, even within specimens of the same coral colony. It is bushy, growing in small colonies that form thickets, creating matrices that are fan-shaped and about 30 to 50 cm high. It has thick skeletal parts that grow in a lamellar pattern. The coral has been found to grow 3–18 mm per year with the addition of about 5 polyps a year. This growth rate has been found to be comparable to related deep sea coral, Lophelia pertusa.

As its skeleton is fragile and unable to sustain a large framework, it is usually found among stronger coral, such as Lophelia pertusa and Goniocorella dumosa, that offer protection. In areas where it dominates, it is usually found in rubble and debris rather than in coral reefs.

The species is a bank-building coral, meaning it tends to build upwards, in a linear fashion. Bank reefs are built by non-photosynthetic calcifiers, as they occur at depths sunlight cannot reach.

Madrepora oculata produces large amounts of extracellular mucus, which acts in a protective capacity to shield the coral skeleton from being bored into by endolithic organisms.

== Distribution & Habitat ==
M. oculata is distributed worldwide, but is most densely concentrated in the northern Atlantic Ocean, southern and western Pacific Ocean, and the Mediterranean Sea. While temperatures range from 5-9 °C in the northern Atlantic Ocean, temperatures reach 11-13 °C in the Mediterranean. Though the species is distributed through many temperatures, it has been shown experimentally that the species does not display thermal acclimation in both respiration and calcification. Alternatively, L. pertusa does exhibit thermal acclimation in respiration and calcification, indicating species-specific diversity between deep sea corals. While M. oculata does not exhibit thermal acclimation, has been experimentally shown to have a high resistance to pH in terms of skeletal growth and calcification.

== Reproduction ==
The species is known to perform continuous reproduction, releasing fewer but larger oocytes when compared to seasonal reproducers like Desmophyllum pertusum. They are broadcast spawners, meaning they release their gametes into open water for fertilization. Madrepora oculata are also gonochoristic, as they possess different gametes for different sexes.

There has been some evidence of seasonality reproduction for the species, although this is hypothesized to be due to environmental signals such as periods of increased primary productivity (allowing for more particulate organic carbon availability in the benthos) rather than true seasonality.

== Hypertrophy ==
The first instances of possible cancer in coral were reported in a species of Madrepora in Hawaiian waters in which hypertrophied corallites were noted. Similarly hypertrophied corallites were described in colonies of Madrepora oculata near northwestern Australia and Japan, as well as in the Formosa Strait and other areas, but have never been confirmed. A recent provisional reinterpretation is that these abnormal corallites are a form of internal gall, an abnormal swelling or growth caused by infection by a parasite, rather than a classical neoplasm.
