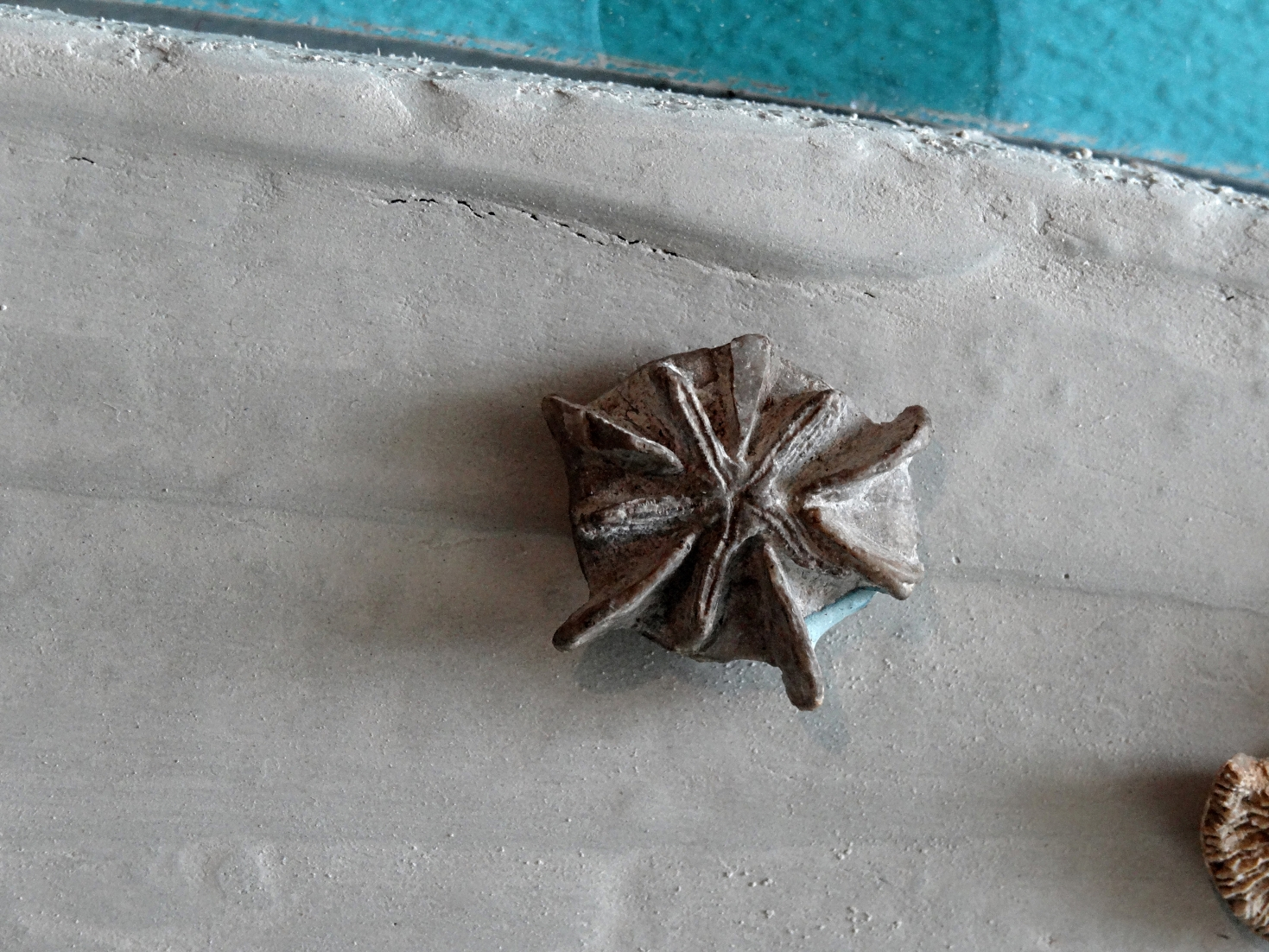
- Trochocyathus sp., Black Jurassic, Germany

Scientific classification
- Kingdom: Animalia
- Phylum: Cnidaria
- Subphylum: Anthozoa
- Class: Hexacorallia
- Order: Scleractinia
- Family: Caryophylliidae
- Genus: Trochocyathus; Milne-Edwards & Haime, 1848

Species
- See text

= Trochocyathus =

Genus of corals

Trochocyathus is a genus of corals in the family Caryophylliidae. Living species are found in waters near Hawai'i at depths of 64 to 1,020 meters (210 to 3,346 ft). Fossil species are found as far back as the latest Paleocene in the Dilwyn Formation of Australia, in the late Cretaceous in the Woodbury Formation of New Jersey, and in Suffolk.

Platycyathus was sometimes regarded as a subgenus within Trochocyathus.

== Species ==
- Trochocyathus aithoseptatus Cairns, 1984
- †Trochocyathus anglicus Duncan, 1872
- †Trochocyathus balanophylloides Bolsche, 1870
- Trochocyathus burchae Cairns, 1984
- Trochocyathus gardineri Vaughan, 1907
- Trochocyathus mauiensis Vaughan, 1907
- Trochocyathus oahensis Vaughan, 1907
- Trochocyathus patelliformis Cairns, 1999
- Trochocyathus rhombocolumna Alcock, 1902
- †Trochocyathus wilkinsoni Dennant, 1904
