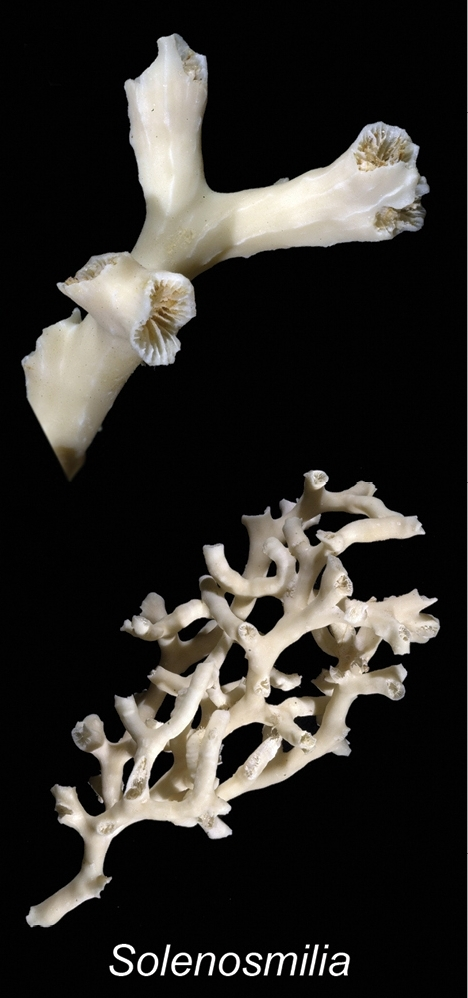

Scientific classification
- Kingdom: Animalia
- Phylum: Cnidaria
- Subphylum: Anthozoa
- Class: Hexacorallia
- Order: Scleractinia
- Family: Caryophylliidae
- Genus: Solenosmilia; Duncan, 1873

Species
- See text

= Solenosmilia =

Genus of corals

Solenosmilia is a genus of small corals in the family Caryophylliidae.

== Species ==
The World Register of Marine Species includes the following species in the genus :

- Solenosmilia australis Cairns & Polonio, 2013
- Solenosmilia variabilis Duncan, 1873
