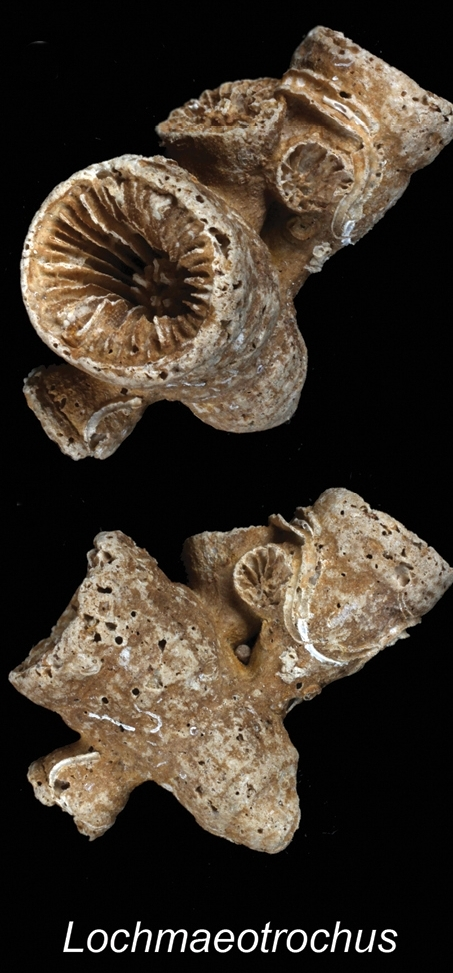
- Lochmaeotrochus oculeus

Scientific classification
- Domain: Eukaryota
- Kingdom: Animalia
- Phylum: Cnidaria
- Subphylum: Anthozoa
- Class: Hexacorallia
- Order: Scleractinia
- Family: Caryophylliidae
- Genus: Lochmaeotrochus; Alcock, 1902

= Lochmaeotrochus =

Genus of corals

Lochmaeotrochus is a genus of cnidarians belonging to the family Caryophylliidae.

The species of this genus are found in Southeastern Asia and Australia.

Species:

- Lochmaeotrochus gardineri Cairns, 1999
- Lochmaeotrochus micrommatus Squires, 1962
- Lochmaeotrochus oculeus Alcock, 1902
