= Coelosmilia =

Coelosmilia Temporal range: Late Cretaceous, 70 Ma

Scientific classification
- Domain: Eukaryota
- Kingdom: Animalia
- Phylum: Cnidaria
- Class: Hexacorallia
- Order: Scleractinia
- Family: Caryophylliidae
- Genus: †Coelosmilia

Genus of corals

Coelosmilia is a genus of extinct scleractinian coral from the Late Cretaceous period. The specimens were found in rocks around 70 million years old dating from the Late Cretaceous of the Mesozoic Era. Coelosmilia is similar to modern-day scleractinians, except for the composition of its calcitic, non-aragonitic skeleton. It is the only known scleractinian so far to have an entirely calcitic skeleton.

Coelosmilia is known from several specimens collected from carbonate Maastrichtian deposits located in the modern-day country of Poland. Together, these areas would have been the continental shelves of the Late Cretaceous European continent. Polish locations known to have produced specimens of the taxon include chalk-pits and quarries in Nasiłów, Lubycza Królewska and Mielnik. The specimens collected from these locations, identified as the ZPAL H.II series (6,7,8) are in the collections of the Paleobiological Institute of the Polish Academy of Sciences.

The discovery and analysis of Coelosmilia has changed the previous understanding of the evolution of the Scleractinia. Modern-day scleractinian corals have skeletons composed of aragonite, a calcitic mineral. Analysis of the skeleton of Coelosmilia does not seem to support development from aragonitic compounds. Instead, the skeleton is primarily calcitic — a type not ever seen in extant scleractinia. It is the first recorded instance of a scleractinian coral producing a non-aragonitic skeleton. Production of non-aragonitic skeletons by marine organisms, or the evolution of organisms capable thereof has been explained as a response to the ratio of the elements Magnesium (Mg) and Calcium (Ca) dissolved in seawater. Magnesium is a component of aragonite, and an abundance of the element is necessary for the development of aragonitic structure-building organisms. The presence of Coelosmilia during the Late Cretaceous has been suggested as an indicator of a low ratio (less than 2) of Mg to Ca in Cretaceous seas. In contrast, modern-day ratios of the two elements would be more than twice the suggested Cretaceous value, at a ratio of around 5.2. This has been used as an indicator of the shifts in the ratios of the two minerals in the oceans over the geologic time scale.
