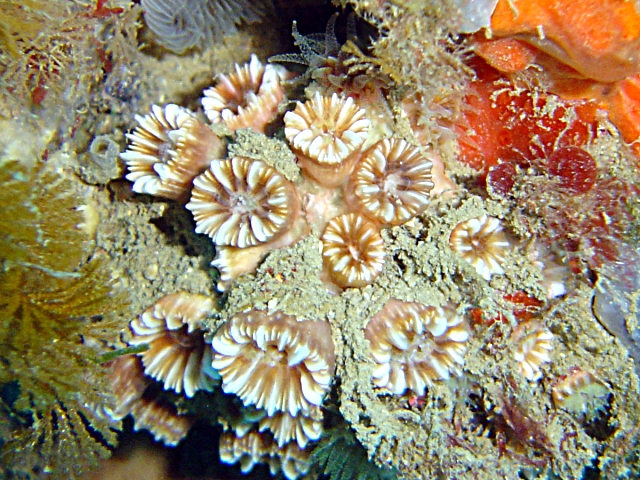

Conservation status
- Least Concern (IUCN 3.1) (Mediterranean)

Scientific classification
- Kingdom: Animalia
- Phylum: Cnidaria
- Subphylum: Anthozoa
- Class: Hexacorallia
- Order: Scleractinia
- Family: Caryophylliidae
- Genus: Polycyathus
- Species: P. muellerae

Binomial name
- Polycyathus muellerae (Abel, 1959)

Synonyms
- Cladocora muellerae Abel, 1959; Polycyathus banyulensis Best, 1968; Polycyathus mediterraneus Best, 1968

= Polycyathus muellerae =

Species of coral

Polycyathus muellerae is a small species of coral in the family Caryophylliidae in the order Scleractinia, the stony corals. It is native to the northeastern Atlantic Ocean and the Mediterranean Sea. It is a large polyp, colonial coral and grows under overhangs and in caves as part of an assemblage of organisms suited to these poorly-lit sites.

== Description ==
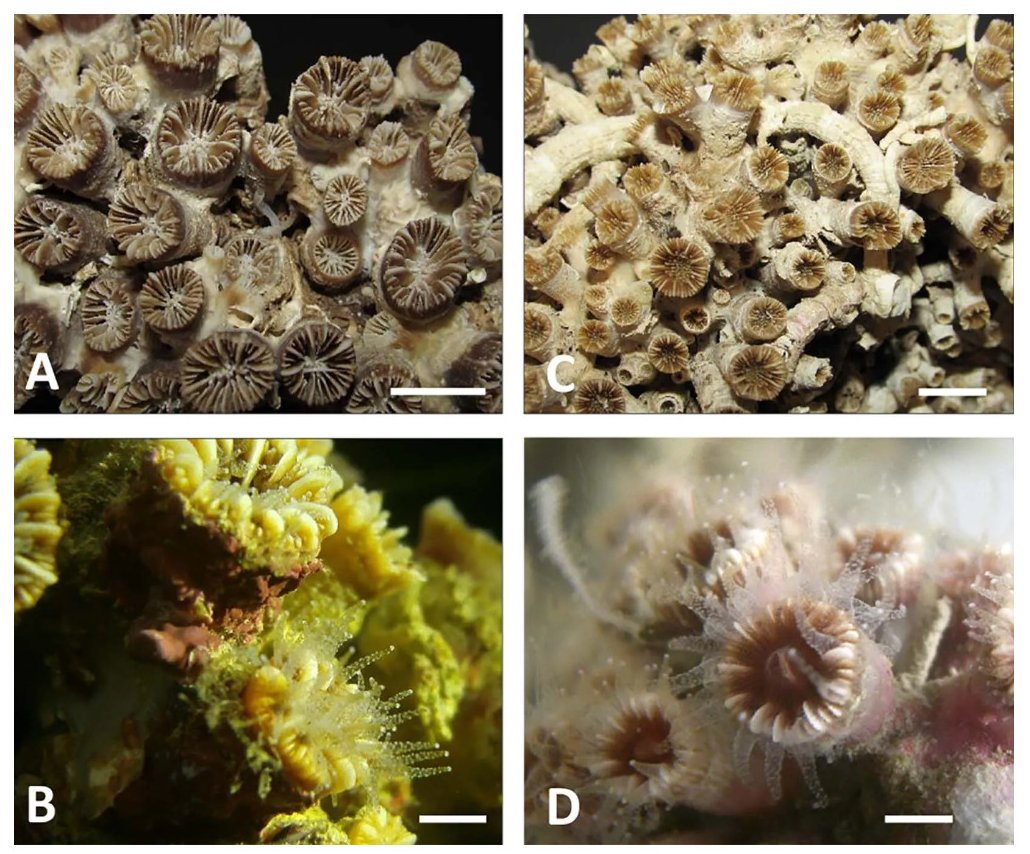
Bleached and in vivo coral colonies of Polycyathus muellerae (right column: C, D). Scale bars: A, C = 1 cm; B, D = 0.5 cm.

Polycyathus muellerae is a colonial species of coral with large polyps. The individual polyps are at first joined by an encrusting basal lamina but with time this may get worn away and other organisms may take up residence between the polyps. Growth in this species is achieved by budding from the basal lamina, and the rather diffuse colonies may be a metre or so in diameter. Each individual polyp sits in a corallite or stony cup, about 6 mm (0.24 in) in diameter and 10 mm (0.4 in) high. The corallites have up to four cycles of toothed septa (stony ridges) making 48 septa in total. Both corallites and polyps are brown and the tentacles, 3 to 4 mm (0.12 to 0.16 in) long, have white granulations and white cylindrical tips.

== Distribution and habitat ==
This species is native to the northeastern Atlantic Ocean, the North Sea, the English Channel and the Mediterranean Sea. It normally avoids direct sunlight and grows in caves and under overhangs at depths of 30 m (100 ft) or less.

== Ecology ==
P. muellerae is a non-zooxanthellate coral; it does not have a symbiotic relationship with microscopic dinoflagellates as do most corals, instead obtaining all its nutrition from the planktonic organisms caught by the polyps. Asexual reproduction by budding increases the size of the colony. Sexual reproduction has not been observed in this species, but the fact that the coral has a widespread distribution suggests that it is likely to occur. This coral is sometimes parasitized by the barnacle Megatrema anglicum.

A study of the assemblages of organisms living in caves in southern Italy found that in the best-lit places near the entrance, algae were plentiful and in the deepest parts of the interior sponges predominated. In the intermediate zone there were corals including Polycyathus muellerae, hydroids, serpulid worms, bivalves, worm snails, bryozoans and sea squirts.
