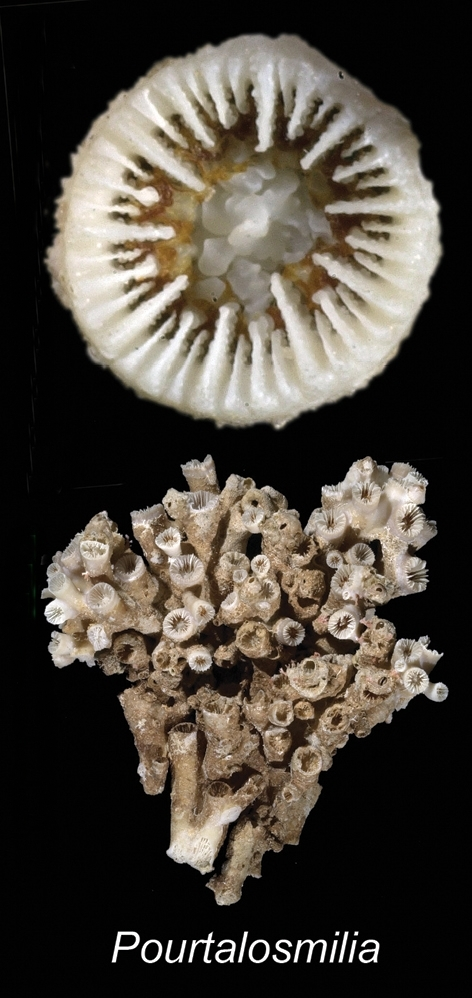
- Pourtalosmilia anthophyllites

Scientific classification
- Kingdom: Animalia
- Phylum: Cnidaria
- Subphylum: Anthozoa
- Class: Hexacorallia
- Order: Scleractinia
- Family: Caryophylliidae
- Genus: Pourtalosmilia; Duncan, 1884

Species
- See text

Synonyms
- Blastosmilia Duncan, 1878

= Pourtalosmilia =

Genus of corals

Pourtalosmilia is a genus of small corals in the family Caryophylliidae.

== Species ==
The World Register of Marine Species includes the following species in the genus :

- Pourtalosmilia anthophyllites (Ellis & Solander, 1786)
- Pourtalosmilia conferta Cairns, 1978
