= Bourneotrochus =

Scientific classification
- Domain: Eukaryota
- Kingdom: Animalia
- Phylum: Cnidaria
- Subphylum: Anthozoa
- Class: Hexacorallia
- Order: Scleractinia
- Family: Caryophylliidae
- Genus: Bourneotrochus; Wells, 1984

Genus of corals

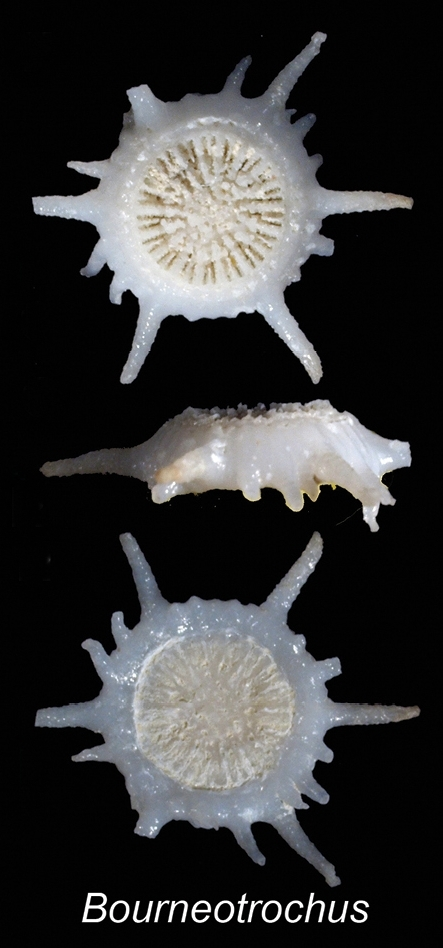

Bourneotrochus is a genus of cnidarians belonging to the family Caryophylliidae.

The species of this genus are found in Australia.

Species:

- Bourneotrochus stellulatus (Cairns, 1984)
- Bourneotrochus veroni
