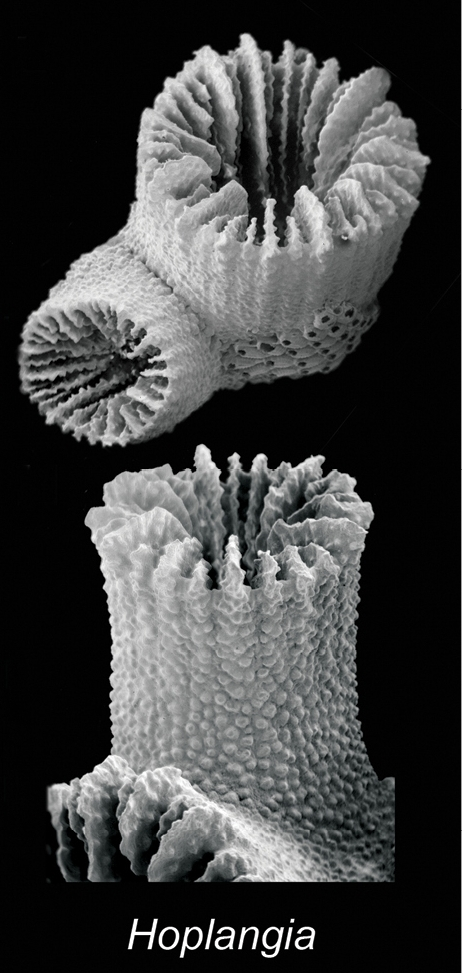
- Hoplangia durotrix

Scientific classification
- Kingdom: Animalia
- Phylum: Cnidaria
- Subphylum: Anthozoa
- Class: Hexacorallia
- Order: Scleractinia
- Family: Caryophylliidae
- Genus: Hoplangia; Gosse, 1860

= Hoplangia =

Genus of corals

Hoplangia is a genus of cnidarians belonging to the family Caryophylliidae.

Species:

- Hoplangia durotrix Gosse, 1860

== Distribution ==
The species of this genus are found in Central and Southern Europe.
