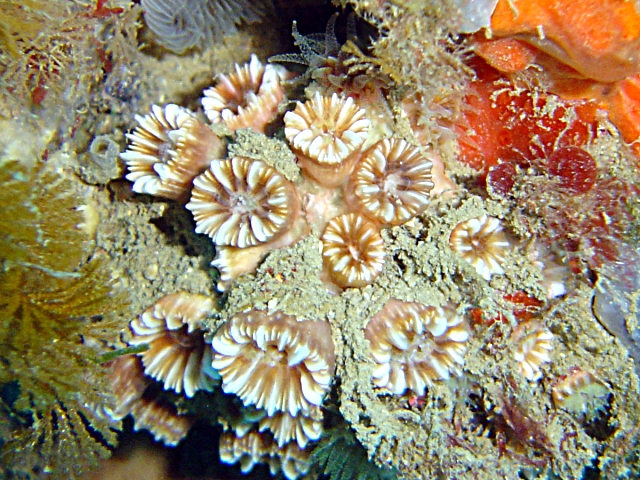
- Polycyathus muellerae

Scientific classification
- Domain: Eukaryota
- Kingdom: Animalia
- Phylum: Cnidaria
- Subphylum: Anthozoa
- Class: Hexacorallia
- Order: Scleractinia
- Family: Caryophylliidae
- Genus: Polycyathus; Duncan, 1876

Species
- See text

= Polycyathus =

Genus of corals

Polycyathus is a genus of small corals in the order Scleractinia, the stony corals. Most species occur in the Pacific Ocean.

== Species ==
Species in the genus include:

- Polycyathus andamanensis Alcock, 1893
- Polycyathus atlanticus Duncan, 1876
- Polycyathus chaishanensis Lin et al., 2012
- Polycyathus difficilis Duncan, 1889
- Polycyathus fulvus Wijsman-Best, 1970
- Polycyathus furanaensis Verheij & Best, 1987
- Polycyathus fuscomarginatus (Klunzinger, 1879)
- Polycyathus hodgsoni Verheij & Best, 1987
- Polycyathus hondaensis (Durham & Barnard, 1952)
- Polycyathus isabela Wells, 1982
- Polycyathus marigondoni Verheij & Best, 1987
- Polycyathus mayae Cairns, 2000
- Polycyathus muellerae (Abel, 1959)
- Polycyathus norfolkensis Cairns, 1995
- Polycyathus octuplus Cairns, 1999
- Polycyathus palifera (Verrill, 1869)
- Polycyathus persicus (Duncan, 1876)
- Polycyathus senegalensis Chevalier, 1966
- Polycyathus verrilli Duncan, 1889
