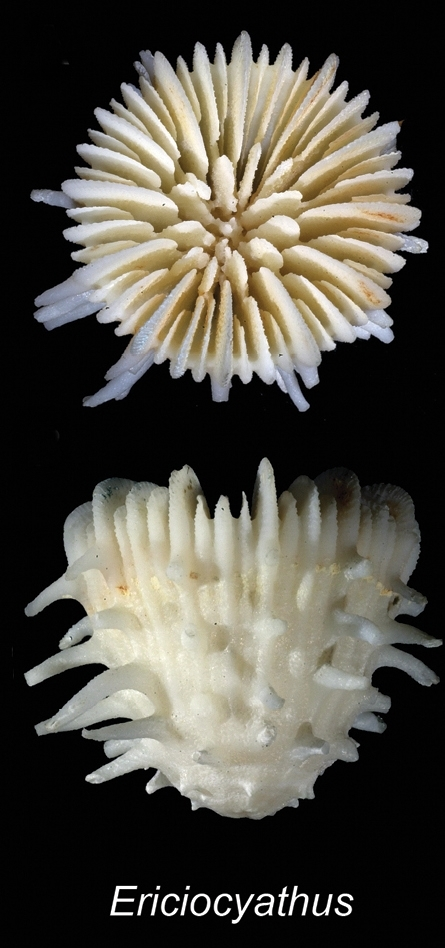
- Ericiocyathus echinatus

Scientific classification
- Domain: Eukaryota
- Kingdom: Animalia
- Phylum: Cnidaria
- Class: Hexacorallia
- Order: Scleractinia
- Family: Caryophylliidae
- Genus: Ericiocyathus; Cairns & Zibrowius, 1997

= Ericiocyathus =

Genus of corals

Ericiocyathus is a genus of cnidarians belonging to the family Caryophylliidae.

The species of this genus are found in Southeastern Asia.

Species:

- Ericiocyathus echinatus Cairns & Zibrowius, 1997
