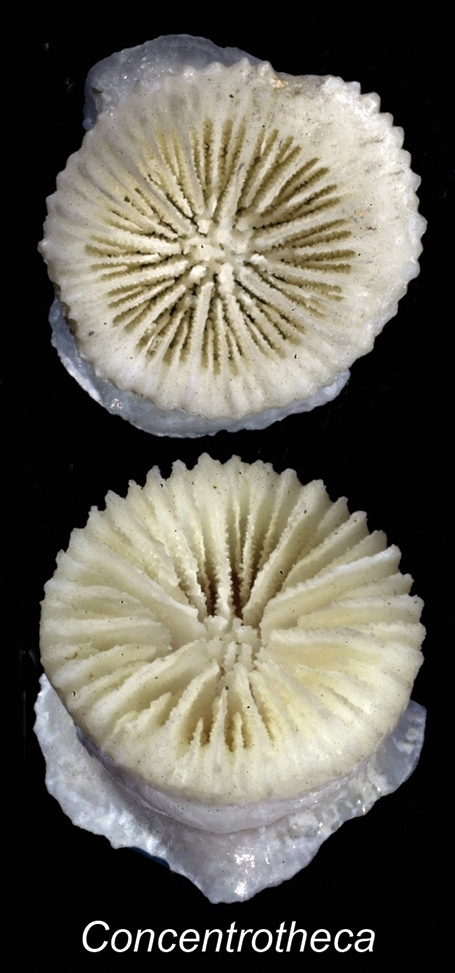
- Concentrotheca laevigata

Scientific classification
- Domain: Eukaryota
- Kingdom: Animalia
- Phylum: Cnidaria
- Class: Hexacorallia
- Order: Scleractinia
- Family: Caryophylliidae
- Genus: Concentrotheca; Cairns, 1979

= Concentrotheca =

Genus of cnidarians

Concentrotheca is a genus of cnidarians belonging to the family Caryophylliidae.

The species of this genus are found in Central America.

Species:

- Concentrotheca laevigata (Pourtalès, 1871)
- Concentrotheca vaughani Cairns, 1991
