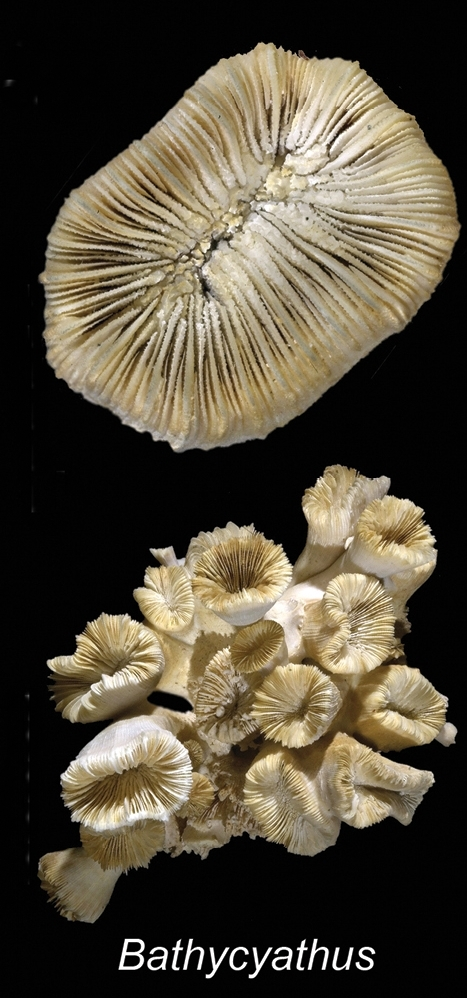
- Bathycyathus chilensis

Scientific classification
- Domain: Eukaryota
- Kingdom: Animalia
- Phylum: Cnidaria
- Subphylum: Anthozoa
- Class: Hexacorallia
- Order: Scleractinia
- Family: Caryophylliidae
- Genus: Bathycyathus; Milne Edwards & Haime, 1848

= Bathycyathus =

Genus of corals

Bathycyathus is a genus of cnidarians belonging to the family Caryophylliidae.

The species of this genus are found in Europe and America.

Species:

- Bathycyathus chilensis Milne Edwards & Haime, 1848
- Bathycyathus matheroni Chevalier, 1956
- Bathycyathus pulcher (Vaughan, 1900)
- Bathycyathus sowerbyi Milne Edwards & Haime, 1850
- Bathycyathus termofurae Chevalier, 1961
