= Asterosmilia =

Scientific classification
- Domain: Eukaryota
- Kingdom: Animalia
- Phylum: Cnidaria
- Class: Hexacorallia
- Order: Scleractinia
- Family: Caryophylliidae
- Genus: Asterosmilia; Duncan, 1867

Extinct genus of corals

Asterosmilia is a genus of cnidarians belonging to the family Caryophylliidae.

The species of this genus are found in Europe, Central Asia, Japan and Central America.

Species:

- Asterosmilia abnormalis (Duncan, 1864)
- Asterosmilia aliquantula Squires, 1958
- Asterosmilia compressa Vaughan, 1925
- Asterosmilia decapali Hassan & Salama, 1970
- Asterosmilia duncani Vaughan, 1925
- Asterosmilia exarata Duncan, 1867
- Asterosmilia machapooriensis Hoffmeister, 1926
- Asterosmilia pourtalesi Duncan, 1873
