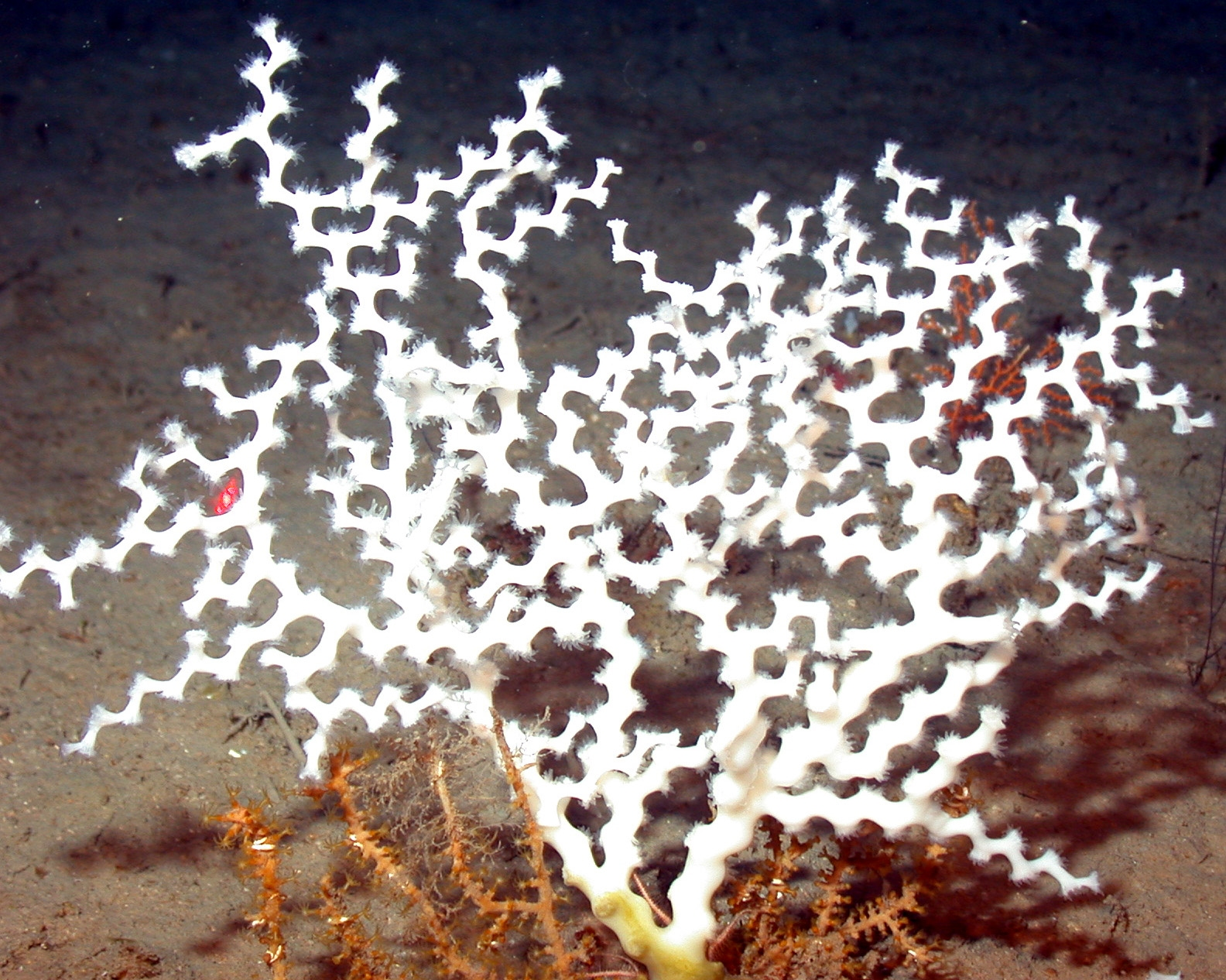
- Madrepora oculata

Scientific classification
- Kingdom: Animalia
- Phylum: Cnidaria
- Subphylum: Anthozoa
- Class: Hexacorallia
- Order: Scleractinia
- Family: Oculinidae
- Genus: Madrepora; Linnaeus, 1758

Synonyms
- Amphelia Milne Edwards & Haime, 1849; Amphihelia Milne Edwards & Haime, 1851; Neohelia Moseley, 1881

= Madrepora =

Genus of corals

Madrepora (Spanish, "mother of pores") is a genus of stony corals, often found forming reefs or islands in tropical locations. The names Madrepore and Madreporaria were formerly applied universally to any stony coral of the family Scleractinia. They reproduce in three separate ways, as discovered by the marine zoologist Anne Thynne (1800–1866). It is commonly known as horn coral. A colony is branched with small polyps in cylindrical cups separated by a perforated coenosteum. Terminal polyps bear six tentacles, while lateral polyps bear twelve tentacles. Madrepora is economically important, since it contributes to the formation of coral reefs.

== Species ==
Species include:

- Madrepora arbuscula (Moseley, 1881)
- Madrepora astroites Forskål, 1775
- Madrepora carolina (Pourtalès, 1871)
- Madrepora minutiseptum Cairns & Zibrowius, 1997
- Madrepora oculata Linnaeus, 1758
- Madrepora porcellana (Moseley, 1881)
- †Madrepora trochiformis Pallas, 1766
