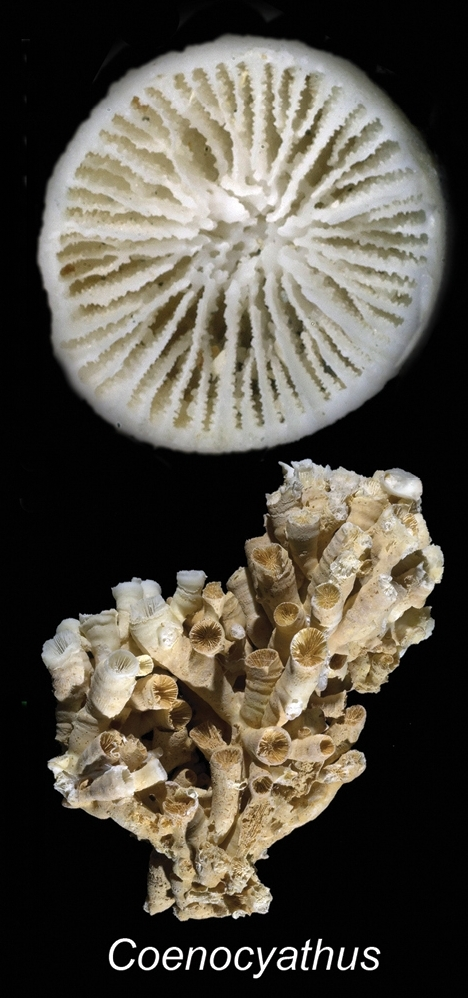
- Coenocyathus anthophyllites

Scientific classification
- Domain: Eukaryota
- Kingdom: Animalia
- Phylum: Cnidaria
- Class: Hexacorallia
- Order: Scleractinia
- Family: Caryophylliidae
- Genus: Coenocyathus; Milne Edwards & Haime, 1848

= Coenocyathus =

Genus of corals

Coenocyathus is a genus of cnidarians belonging to the family Caryophylliidae.

The genus has almost cosmopolitan distribution.

Species:

- Coenocyathus anthophyllites Milne Edwards & Haime, 1848
- Coenocyathus bowersi Vaughan, 1906
- Coenocyathus brooki Cairns, 1995
- Coenocyathus caribbeana Cairns, 2000
- Coenocyathus cylindricus Milne Edwards & Haime, 1848
- Coenocyathus goreaui Wells, 1972
- Coenocyathus hannibali Durham, 1942
- Coenocyathus humanni Cairns, 2000
- Coenocyathus parvulus (Cairns, 1979)
- Coenocyathus sebroecki Kitahara, Capel & Migotto, 2020
- Coenocyathus simplex Chevalier, 1961
- Coenocyathus taurinensis d'Achiardi, 1868
