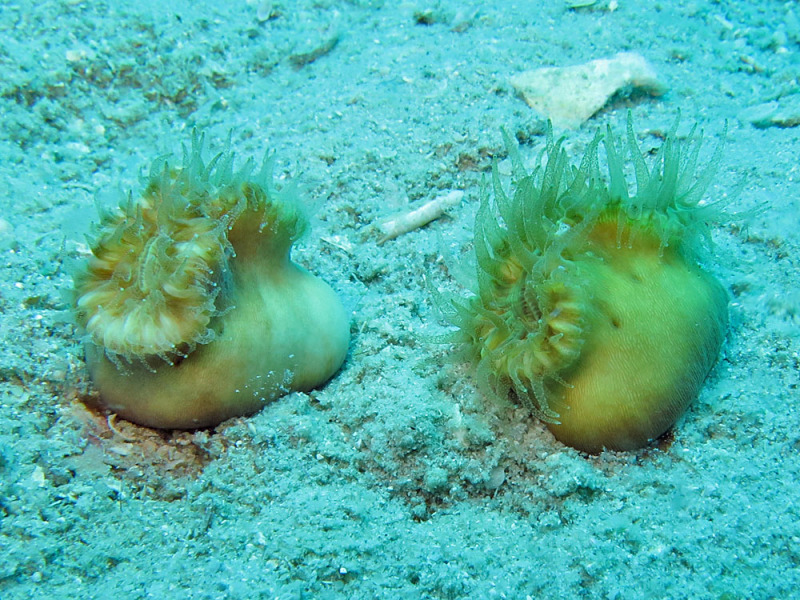
- At Watson's Bay, Lizard Island, 17 metres depth

Conservation status
- Least Concern (IUCN 3.1)

Scientific classification
- Kingdom: Animalia
- Phylum: Cnidaria
- Subphylum: Anthozoa
- Class: Hexacorallia
- Order: Scleractinia
- Family: Dendrophylliidae
- Genus: Heteropsammia
- Species: H. cochlea

Binomial name
- Heteropsammia cochlea (Spengler, 1781)

Synonyms
- List: Heteropsammia aphrodes Alcock, 1893; Heteropsammia michelinii Milne Edwards & Haime, 1848; Heteropsammia ovalis Semper, 1872; Heteropsammia pisum Alcock, 1902; Heteropsammia rotundata Semper, 1872; Madrepora cochlea Spengler, 1781

= Heteropsammia cochlea =

Species of coral

Heteropsammia cochlea, also known as walking dendro, is a species of small solitary coral in the family Dendrophylliidae that is native to the Indo-Pacific area.

== Description ==
This small solitary free-living coral, not more than 2.5 cm across, is not fixed to the sea floor. It is composed of one or two corallites in the shape of a figure of eight when observed from top, making it easy to identify. The base in contact with the bottom is relatively circular, depending on the nature of the substrate it is either flat or slightly keeled. The base has an orifice that houses a commensal worm belonging to the family Aspidosiphonidae. The overall color is yellowish, grayish or greenish. The polyp tentacles can be seen deployed, especially at night.

== Distribution & habitat ==
The walking dendro is widespread throughout the tropical and subtropical waters of the Indo-West Pacific area from the eastern coasts of Africa, Red Sea included, to Philippines and from southern Japan to Australia and New Caledonia.

This species likes the sea floor, flat bottom or with a gentle slope, from one meter to 40 meters deep.

== Biology ==
The walking dendro is a common species that can be relatively abundant in some areas. It may reproduce sexually by gamete release or asexually by budding of a new individual from the "parent body". There is no apparent sexual dimorphism between males and females. When breeding occurs in open water, the larva starts with a planktonic stage before landing and growing on the shell of a microgastropod that it will in time fully envelop.

To survive in its biotope and especially to avoid getting buried, this small coral has an obligate commensal relationship with a small sipunculid worm, Aspidosiphon muelleri, which is lodged under the base of the coral. The worm's movements as it seek food prevents the coral from being buried. This however makes the coral dependent on the worm staying nearby. This small coral often has a small parasitic mussel, Lithophaga lessepsiana.
