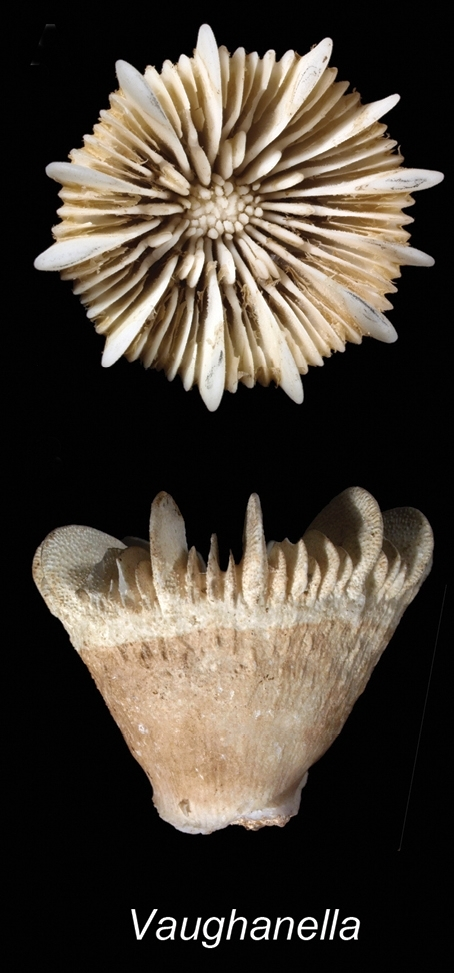
- Vaughanella concinna

Scientific classification
- Kingdom: Animalia
- Phylum: Cnidaria
- Subphylum: Anthozoa
- Class: Hexacorallia
- Order: Scleractinia
- Family: Caryophylliidae
- Genus: Vaughanella; Gravier, 1915

Species
- See text

= Vaughanella =

Genus of corals

Vaughanella is a genus of small corals in the family Caryophylliidae.

== Species ==
The World Register of Marine Species includes the following species in the genus :

- Vaughanella concinna Gravier, 1915
- Vaughanella margaritata (Jourdan, 1895)
- Vaughanella multipalifera Cairns, 1995
- Vaughanella oreophila Keller, 1981
