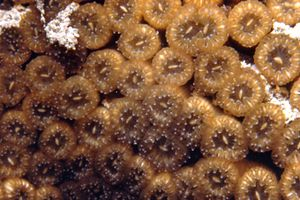
- Cladocora caespitosa

Scientific classification
- Domain: Eukaryota
- Kingdom: Animalia
- Phylum: Cnidaria
- Class: Hexacorallia
- Order: Scleractinia
- Family: incertae sedis
- Genus: Cladocora; Ehrenberg, 1834

= Cladocora =

Genus of corals

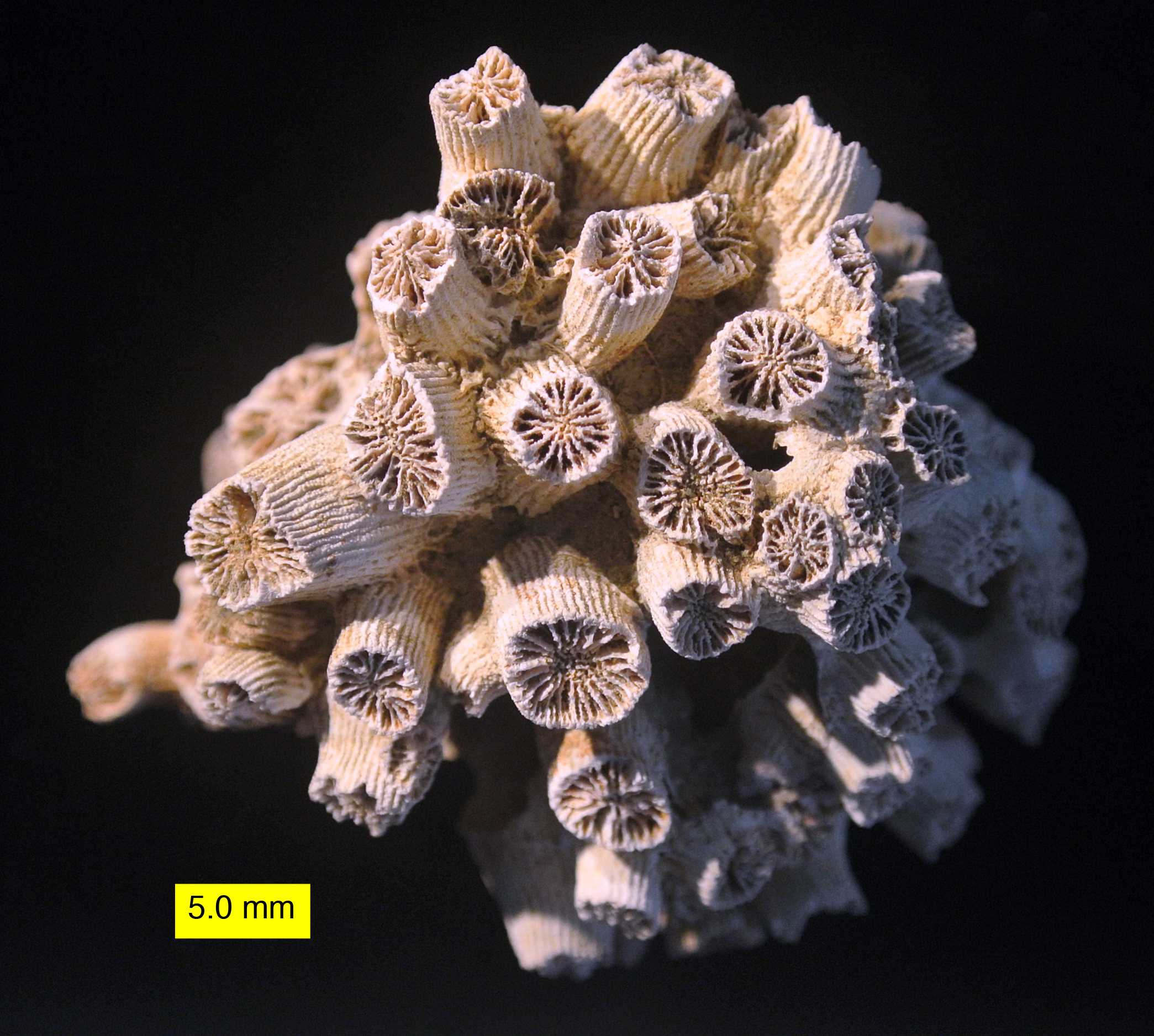
Cladocora from the Pliocene of Cyprus.

Cladocora is a genus of corals in the order of stony corals.

== Species ==
Species in this genus include:

- Cladocora arbuscula (Le Sueur, 1821)
- Cladocora caespitosa (Linnaeus, 1767)
- Cladocora debilis Milne Edwards & Haime, 1849
- Cladocora pacifica Cairns, 1991
