= Ceratotrochus =

Scientific classification
- Kingdom: Animalia
- Phylum: Cnidaria
- Subphylum: Anthozoa
- Class: Hexacorallia
- Order: Scleractinia
- Family: Caryophylliidae
- Genus: Ceratotrochus; Milne Edwards & Haime, 1848

Synonyms
- Turbinolia (Ceratotrochus) Milne Edwards & Haime, 1848 Axocyathus Alloiteau, 1952

Genus of corals

Ceratotrochus is a genus of marine invertebrates belonging to cnidarians to the family Caryophylliidae. Many of the species in the genus are extinct.

It originated during the latter half of the Cretaceous period. This genus belongs to the Scleractinia order. They are blind as they belong to the Anthozoa subphylum.

== Species ==
Extinct and living species that belong to the genus Ceratotrochus:

- †Ceratotrochus ambiguus (Brünnich Nielsen, 1922)
- †Ceratotrochus amphitrites (Felix, 1903)
- †Ceratotrochus anceps (Michelotti, 1871)
- †Ceratotrochus australiensis (Duncan, 1870)
- †Ceratotrochus clinatus (Dennant, 1903)
- †Ceratotrochus discrepans (Reuss, 1872)
- †Ceratotrochus exaratus (Michelin, 1846)
- †Ceratotrochus exiguis (de Fromentel, 1862)
- †Ceratotrochus exilis (Dennant, 1902)
- Ceratotrochus franciscana (Durham & Barnard, 1952)
- †Ceratotrochus ginginensis (Etheridge, 1913)
- †Ceratotrochus halli (Dennant, 1902)
- Ceratotrochus laxus (Vaughan, 1907)
- Ceratotrochus magnaghii (Cecchini, 1914)
- †Ceratotrochus milthersii (Brünnich Nielsen, 1922)
- †Ceratotrochus miopliocenica (Osasco, 1895)
- †Ceratotrochus multispinosus (Michelotti, 1838)
- Ceratotrochus ornatus (Seguenza, 1864)
- †Ceratotrochus perplexus (Michelotti, 1871)
- †Ceratotrochus putillus (Wells, 1945)
- †Ceratotrochus rimosus (Michelotti, 1871)
- †Ceratotrochus saltholmensis (Brünnich Nielsen, 1922)
- †Ceratotrochus supracretaceus (Hennig, 1899)
