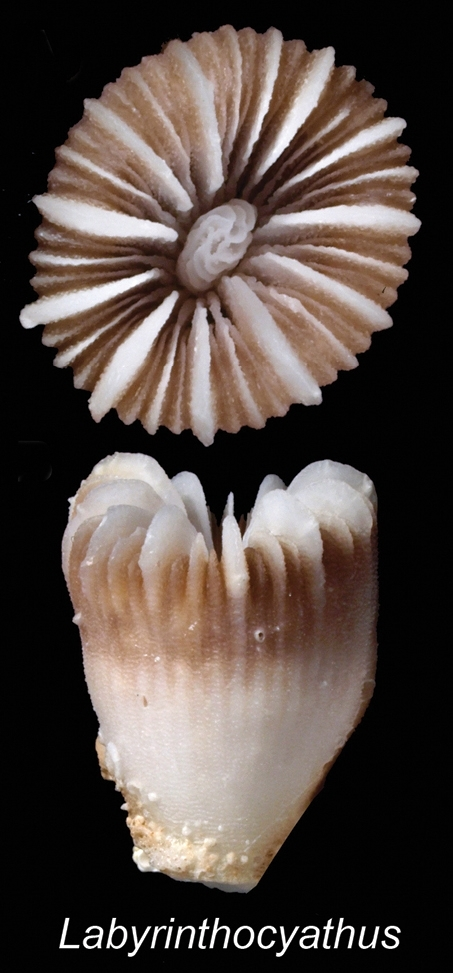
- Labyrinthocyathus limatulus

Scientific classification
- Domain: Eukaryota
- Kingdom: Animalia
- Phylum: Cnidaria
- Subphylum: Anthozoa
- Class: Hexacorallia
- Order: Scleractinia
- Family: Caryophylliidae
- Genus: Labyrinthocyathus; Cairns, 1979

= Labyrinthocyathus =

Genus of corals

Labyrinthocyathus is a genus of cnidarians belonging to the family Caryophylliidae.

The species of this genus are found in Africa, Southeastern Asia, Northern America and Australia.

Species:

- Labyrinthocyathus delicatus (Marenzeller, 1904)
- Labyrinthocyathus facetus Cairns, 1979
- Labyrinthocyathus langae Cairns, 1979
- Labyrinthocyathus limatulus (Squires, 1964)
- Labyrinthocyathus quaylei (Durham, 1947)
