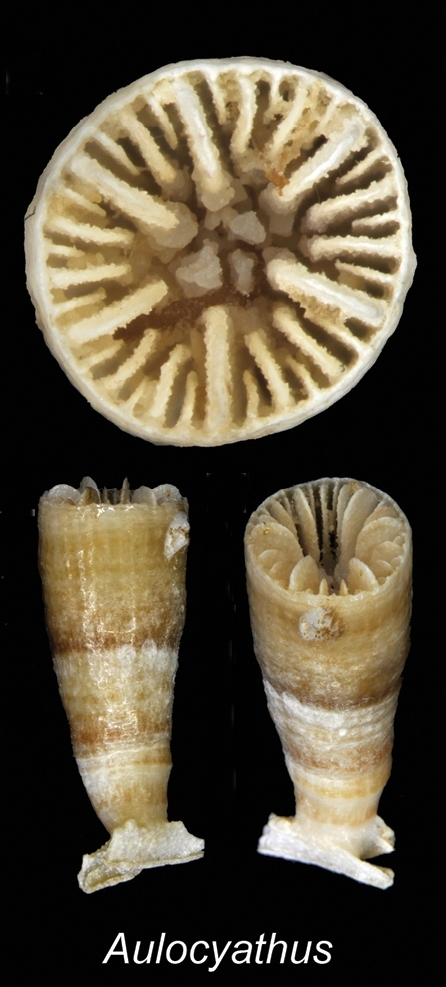
- Aulocyathus juvenescens

Scientific classification
- Domain: Eukaryota
- Kingdom: Animalia
- Phylum: Cnidaria
- Class: Hexacorallia
- Order: Scleractinia
- Family: Caryophylliidae
- Genus: Aulocyathus; Marenzeller, 1904

= Aulocyathus =

Genus of corals

Aulocyathus is a genus of cnidarians belonging to the family Caryophylliidae.

The genus has almost cosmopolitan distribution.

Species:

- Aulocyathus atlanticus Zibrowius, 1980
- Aulocyathus juvenescens Marenzeller, 1904
- Aulocyathus matricidus (Kent, 1871)
- Aulocyathus recidivus (Dennant, 1906)
