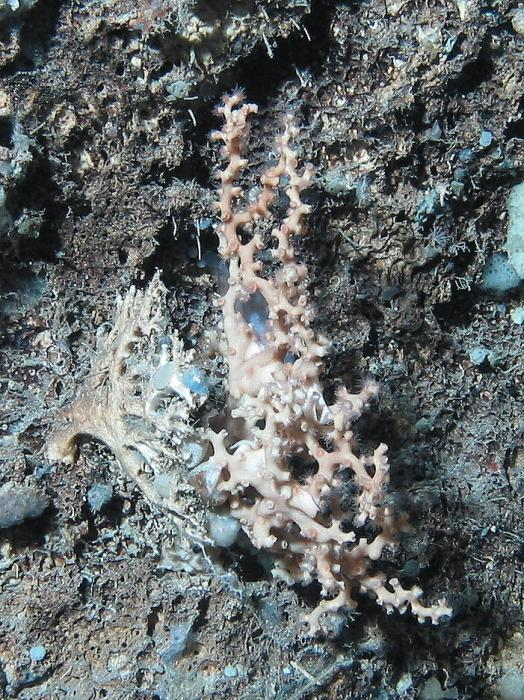

Conservation status
- Declining (NZ TCS)

Scientific classification
- Kingdom: Animalia
- Phylum: Cnidaria
- Subphylum: Anthozoa
- Class: Hexacorallia
- Order: Scleractinia
- Family: Caryophylliidae
- Genus: Solenosmilia
- Species: S. variabilis

Binomial name
- Solenosmilia variabilis Duncan, 1873

Synonyms
- Solenosmilia jeffreyi Alcock, 1898

= Solenosmilia variabilis =

Species of cnidarian

Solenosmilia variabilis is a species of colonial coral in the family Caryophylliidae. It is a deep water, azooxanthellate coral with a semi-cosmopolitan distribution.

== Description ==
Solenosmilia variabilis grows into small bushy colonies, the dichotomous branches often joining. It grows from an encrusting base on which there are a few corallites. The branches are thick near the base of the colony but more slender above; sometimes upper branches are just 3 to 5 millimetres (0.12 to 0.20 in) in diameter. The coenosteum can be smooth and white, granular, glossy and pale grey, or ridged with eight to ten transverse costae. The corallites are up to 5 millimetres (0.2 in) in diameter, with the septa grouped in sixes, arranged in three or more cycles. Growth of the colony is by intratentacular budding.

== Distribution ==
S. variabilis has a semi-cosmopolitan distribution. It is widespread in both the Atlantic and Indian Oceans and has a circumpolar distribution in the Southern Ocean. Locations where it has been found include off South Africa, off Prince Edward Island, off Île Saint-Paul, off southeastern Australia, off New Zealand, off South Orkney Islands, off Tristan Island, on the Hjort Seamount (south of Macquarie Island), on the Macquarie Ridge, and on seamounts in the South Pacific and Drake Passage. Its known depth range is 220 to 2,165 metres (720 to 7,100 ft).

== Ecology ==
S. variabilis is a widespread species of deep sea reef-building coral; in the southwestern Pacific it is the dominant coral species on seamounts and rocky substrates in the depth range 1,000 to 1,300 metres (3,300 to 4,300 ft). In this location, it is a major part of a diverse community which is easily damaged by deepwater trawling. It is a long-lived species with a growth rate of about 1 millimetre (0.04 in) per year and it may be adversely affected by ocean acidification and climate change.
