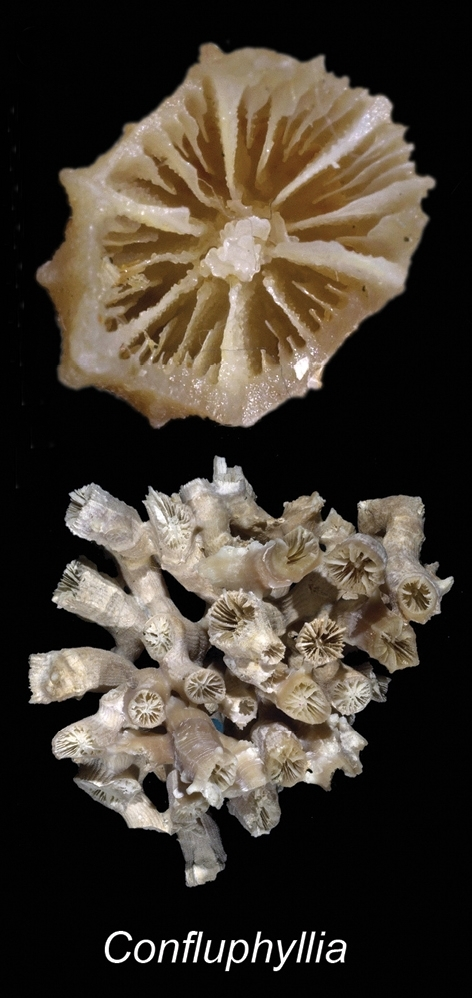
- Confluphyllia juncta specimines

Scientific classification
- Domain: Eukaryota
- Kingdom: Animalia
- Phylum: Cnidaria
- Class: Hexacorallia
- Order: Scleractinia
- Family: Caryophylliidae
- Genus: Confluphyllia; Cairns & Zibrowius, 1997

= Confluphyllia =

Genus of corals

Confluphyllia is a genus of cnidarians belonging to the family Caryophylliidae.

The species of this genus are found in Australia.

Species:

- Confluphyllia juncta Cairns & Zibrowius, 1997
