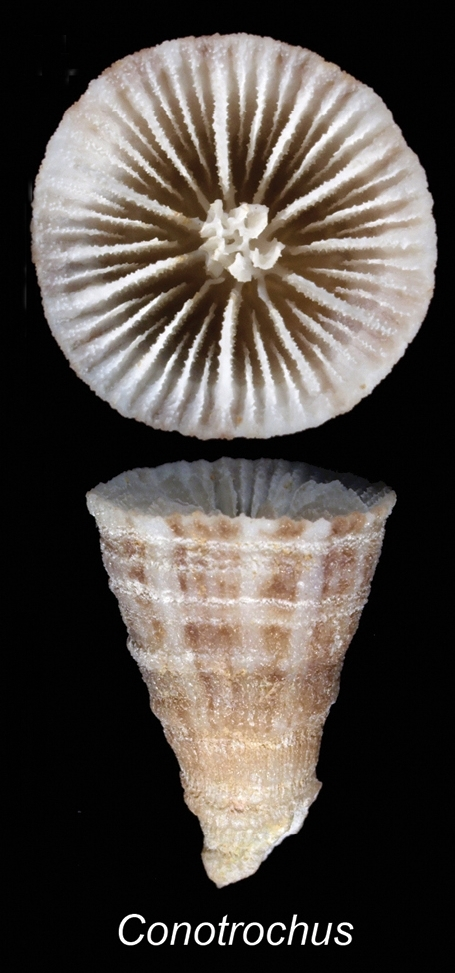
- Conotrochus funicolumna

Scientific classification
- Kingdom: Animalia
- Phylum: Cnidaria
- Subphylum: Anthozoa
- Class: Hexacorallia
- Order: Scleractinia
- Family: Caryophylliidae
- Genus: Conotrochus; Seguenza, 1864

Species
- See text

= Conotrochus =

Genus of corals

Conotrochus is a genus of small corals in the family Caryophylliidae. It holds four species.

== Species ==
The World Register of Marine Species includes the following species in the genus:

- Conotrochus asymmetros Cairns, 1999
- Conotrochus brunneus (Moseley, 1881)
- Conotrochus funicolumna (Alcock, 1902)
- Conotrochus typus † Seguenza, 1863
