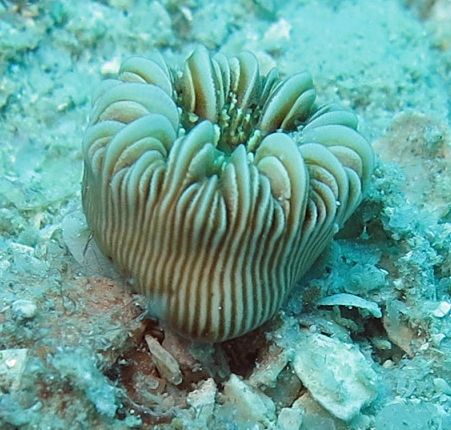
- Heterocyathus aequicostatus

Scientific classification
- Kingdom: Animalia
- Phylum: Cnidaria
- Subphylum: Anthozoa
- Class: Hexacorallia
- Order: Scleractinia
- Family: Caryophylliidae
- Genus: Heterocyathus; Milne-Edwards and Haime, 1848

Synonyms
- Brachytrochus Duncan, 1876 (junior homonym); Brachytrochus Reuss, 1864 †; Heterocyathus (Stephanoseris) Milne-Edwards & Haime, 1851; Psammoseris Milne-Edwards & Haime, 1851; Spongiocyathus Folkeson, 1919; Stephanoseris Milne-Edwards & Haime, 1851

= Heterocyathus =

Genus of coral

Heterocyathus is a genus of coral of the family Caryophylliidae.

== Species ==
- Heterocyathus aequicostatus Milne-Edwards and Haime, 1848 (type species)
  - Subspecies Heterocyathus aequicostatus delicatus Sakakura, 1935
  - Subspecies Heterocyathus aequicostatus parasiticus Semper, 1872
- Heterocyathus alternatus Verrill, 1865
- Heterocyathus antoniae Reyes, Santodomingo & Cairns, 2009
- Heterocyathus hemisphaericus Gray, 1849
- Heterocyathus sulcatus (Verrill, 1866)
- Heterocyathus cochlea (Spengler, 1781)
- Heterocyathus eupsammides Gray, 1849
- Heterocyathus hemisphericus Gray, 1849
- Heterocyathus heterocostatus Harrison, 1911
- Heterocyathus incrustans (Dennant, 1906)
- Heterocyathus japonicus (Verrill, 1866)
- Heterocyathus lamellosus (Verrill, 1865)
- Heterocyathus mai Cheng, 1971
- Heterocyathus oblongatus Rehberg, 1892
- Heterocyathus parasiticus Semper, 1872
- Heterocyathus philippensis Semper, 1872
- Heterocyathus philippinensis Semper, 1872
- Heterocyathus pulchellus Rehberg, 1892
- Heterocyathus roussaeanus Milne-Edwards & Haime, 1848
- Heterocyathus rousseaui (Milne-Edwards & Haime, 1857)
- Heterocyathus woodmasoni Alcock, 1893

== Ecology ==
'Mobility of this genus is facultative which means they have the capacity to move around but not always will they exhibit it. Heterocyathus could have zooxanthellae in shallow water, however, they may live on without symbiotic algae at deeper depths. The Heterocyathus species is sometimes hermatypic or a hard coral primarily responsible for reef-building. In the case of Heterocyathus, reefs are made as the species produces layers of calcium carbonate beneath their bodies. They show epifaunal characteristics and hence are seen in deeper areas of water. They are microcarnivores feeding on tiny organisms. A species of hermit crabs, Diogenidae Heteropsammia, allows for the Heterocyathus the ability to roam around the seafloor.

== Symbiotic Relationships ==
Heterocyathus has both a mutualism and parasitism relationship with another organism called the Albian scleractinian- sipunculan (commonly known as a type of worm). The coral benefits since the worm offers nutrients and food, meanwhile the worm benefits since the coral is a form of protection or shelter. However, if the shell of the coral outgrows the worm, the worm benefits by gaining total protection, thus making a parasitism relationship

[10]http://journals.plos.org/plosone/article?id=10.1371/journal.pone.0184311
