= Rejuvenescence =

Survival strategy by coral

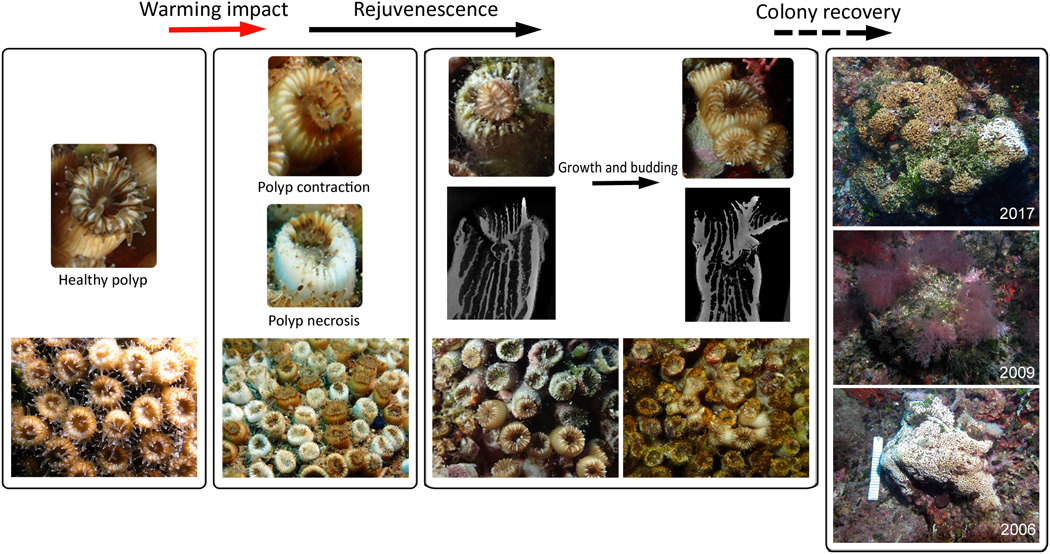
Rejuvenescence of Cladocora caespitosa at the polyp and colony levels

Rejuvenescence is a unique survival strategy observed in certain coral species, which enables them to recover from harmful warming events. This strategy involves the contraction and subsequent rejuvenation of individual coral polyps within a colony. During warm periods, the polyps shrink inward and abandon their skeletons, only to later regenerate and rebuild their colonies. This mechanism involves a decrease metabolic activity, leading to a significant shrinking of the polyps, their partial retreat from inner skeletal structures, and the formation of a new protective cup, known as a calyx.

Rejuvenescence represents the ability of corals to adapt and persist in the face of environmental stressors, providing hope for their resilience in the context of climate change. This survival mechanism, previously known only in extinct fossil corals, has now been documented in living corals in the Mediterranean Sea, specifically Cladocora caespitosa. A study published in 2019 gives insight on the significance of rejuvenescence and its potential implications for the long-term survival of coral reefs.
