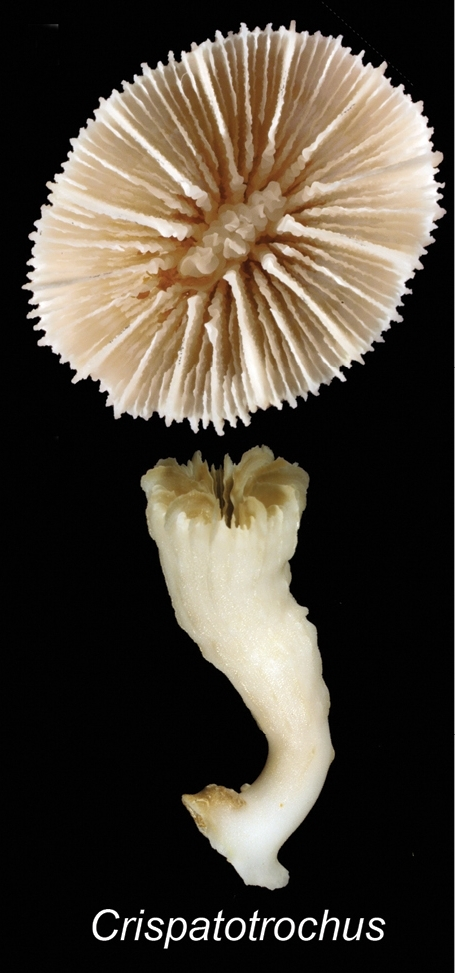
- ZooKeys - Crispatotrochus rubescens

Scientific classification
- Kingdom: Animalia
- Phylum: Cnidaria
- Subphylum: Anthozoa
- Class: Hexacorallia
- Order: Scleractinia
- Family: Caryophylliidae
- Genus: Crispatotrochus; Tenison-Woods, 1878

= Crispatotrochus =

Genus of corals

Crispatotrochus is a genus of cnidarians belonging to the family Caryophylliidae.

The genus has cosmopolitan distribution.

== Species ==
Species:

- Crispatotrochus antarcticus Stolarski, 1996
- Crispatotrochus avis (Durham & Barnard, 1952)
- Crispatotrochus cornu (Moseley, 1881)
- Crispatotrochus foxi (Durham & Barnard, 1952)
