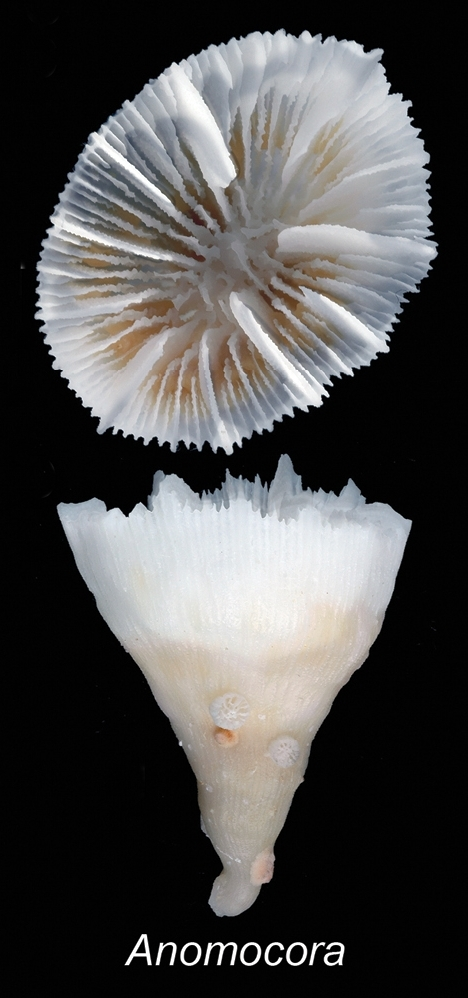
- Anomocora gigas

Scientific classification
- Kingdom: Animalia
- Phylum: Cnidaria
- Subphylum: Anthozoa
- Class: Hexacorallia
- Order: Scleractinia
- Family: Caryophylliidae
- Genus: Anomocora; Studer, 1878

= Anomocora =

Genus of corals

Anomocora is a genus of cnidarians belonging to the family Caryophylliidae.

The genus has almost a cosmopolitan distribution.

== Species ==
Species:

- Anomocora carinata Cairns, 1991
- Anomocora exilis Wells, 1976
- Anomocora fecunda (Pourtalès, 1871)
