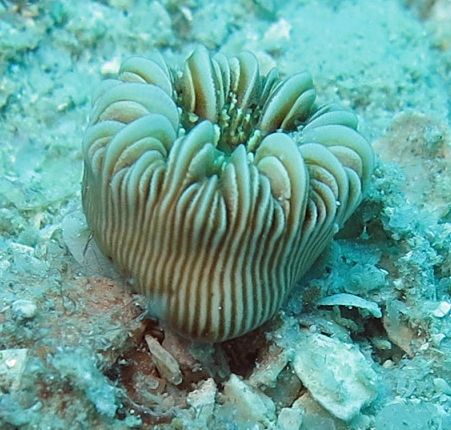

Conservation status
- Least Concern (IUCN 3.1)

Scientific classification
- Kingdom: Animalia
- Phylum: Cnidaria
- Subphylum: Anthozoa
- Class: Hexacorallia
- Order: Scleractinia
- Family: Caryophylliidae
- Genus: Heterocyathus
- Species: H. aequicostatus

Binomial name
- Heterocyathus aequicostatus Milne Edwards & Haime, 1848

Synonyms
- List: Brachytrochus simplex Duncan, 1876; Heterocyathus cochlea (Spengler, 1781); Heterocyathus japonicus (Verrill, 1866); Heterocyathus lamellosus (Verrill, 1865); Heterocyathus oblongatus Rehberg, 1892; Heterocyathus philippinensis Semper, 1872; Heterocyathus roussaeanus Milne Edwards & Haime, 1848; Heterocyathus rousseaui (Milne Edwards & Haime, 1857); Heterocyathus woodmasoni Alcock, 1893; Psammoseris rousseaui Milne Edwards & Haime, 1851; Stephanoseris japonicus Verrill, 1866; Stephanoseris lamellosa Verrill, 1865; Stephanoseris rousseaui Milne Edwards & Haime, 1851

= Heterocyathus aequicostatus =

Species of coral

Heterocyathus aequicostatus is a small species of coral in the family Caryophylliidae in the order Scleractinia, the stony corals. It is native to the Indo-Pacific region. It is a large polyp, solitary, free-living coral and is usually found on soft substrates.

== Description ==
Heterocyathus aequicostatus is a small, solitary, free-living coral with a flat base. The polyp sits in a roughly circular corallite (stony cup) which has up to four cycles of toothed septa (stony ridges) radiating from it, making 48 septa in total. These continue over the rim of the corallite as prominent costa (ridges) down to the smooth, flat base. This coral grows to a maximum diameter of 1.5 cm (0.6 in) and is a pale brown colour, often with a pale green oral disc.

== Distribution and habitat ==
Heterocyathus aequicostatus is native to the tropical and sub-tropical Indo-Pacific region, its range extending from Madagascar and the Arabian Peninsula to Indonesia, Australia, the Philippines and Japan. It is found at depths of at least 20 m (66 ft) and sometimes down to 100 m (330 ft) on level or gently sloping sandy or gravelly shelves between reefs.

== Ecology ==
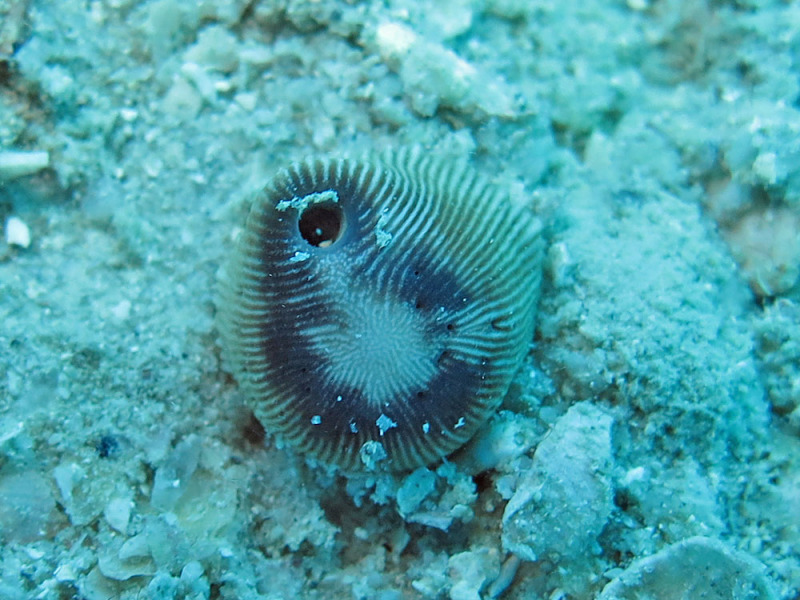
Sipunculid worm Aspidosiphon muelleri inside H. aequicostatus

This coral sometimes harbours photosynthetic, single-celled dinoflagellates called Zooxanthellae in its tissues. The polyps extend their tentacles at night to feed, normally remaining retracted by day. The larvae are planktonic, and when fully developed they are attracted to settle on the shells of tiny gastropod molluscs, gradually enveloping the molluscs as they grow into juvenile corals.

In Australia, this coral often lives in symbiosis with the sipunculid worm, Aspidosiphon muelleri. The worm often has an entrance hole on the oral disc through which it can extend its introvert to feed. Another hole in the base of the coral is used by the worm to move the coral about on the sandy seabed, preventing the coral from becoming buried.

== Status ==
In general coral reefs are being degraded, and although this coral is a common species, it is likely that its populations are in decline along with their habitats. The International Union for Conservation of Nature has listed H. aequicostatus as being of "least concern" as it considers that the rate of decline in its populations is not sufficient to justify listing it in a more threatened category.
