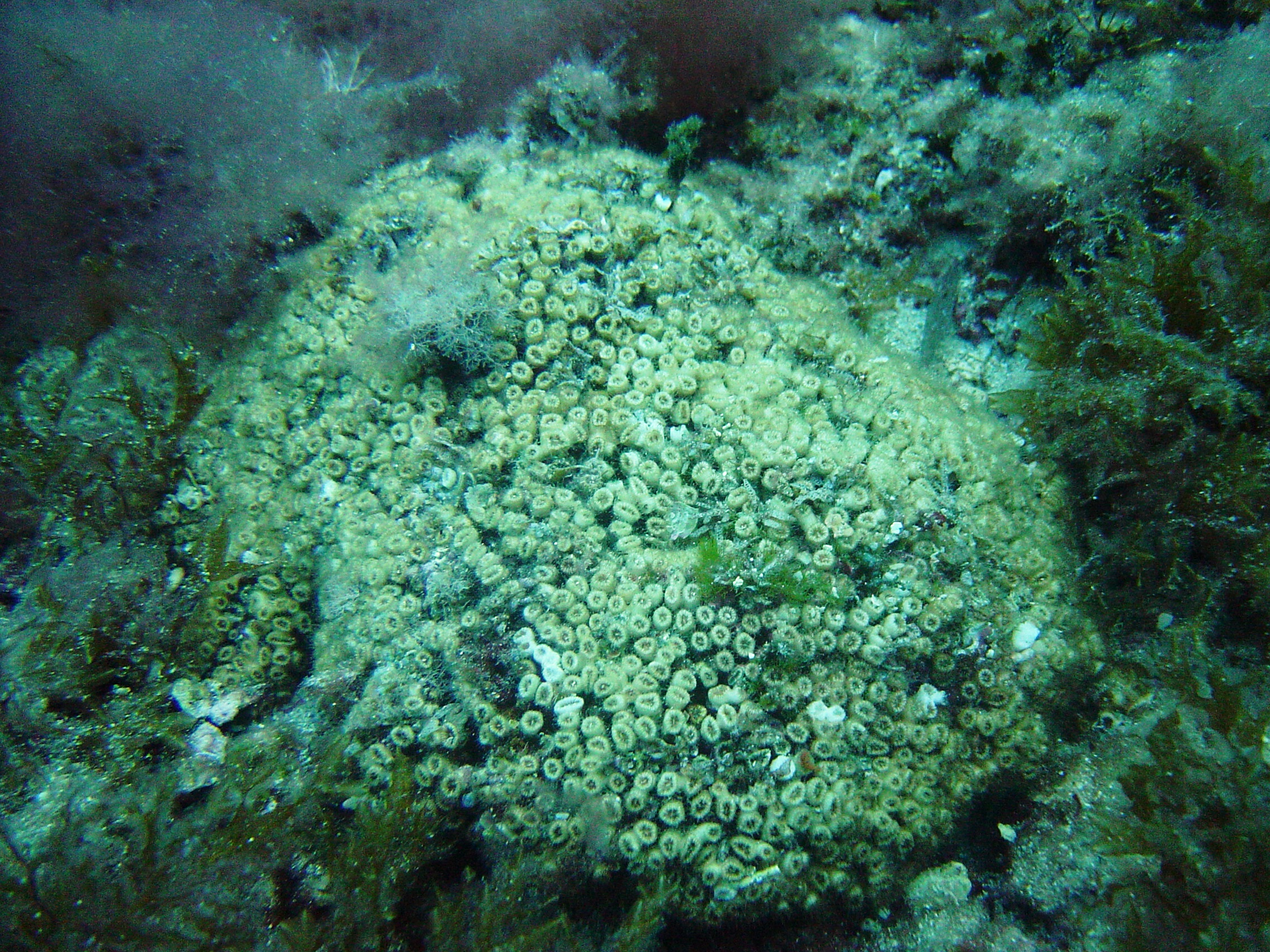

Conservation status
- Endangered (IUCN 3.1)

Scientific classification
- Kingdom: Animalia
- Phylum: Cnidaria
- Subphylum: Anthozoa
- Class: Hexacorallia
- Order: Scleractinia
- Family: incertae sedis
- Genus: Cladocora
- Species: C. caespitosa

Binomial name
- Cladocora caespitosa (Linnaeus, 1758)

Synonyms
- Madrepora caespitosa Linnaeus, 1767

= Cladocora caespitosa =

Species of coral

Cladocora caespitosa, commonly known as mediterranean pillow coral or cushion coral, is a stony coral of the subclass Hexacorallia. This species forms the only true coral reef in the Mediterranean Sea.

The species has been observed to demonstrate rejuvenescence, a unique survival strategy that enables the species to recover after warming events.

== Description ==
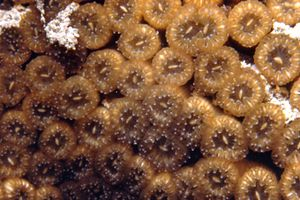
Close-up showing corallites

The polyps are a clear maroon colour, around 5 mm in diameter and form cushion-shaped colonies, in symbiosis with Zooxanthella algae. They produce deposits of calcium carbonate which form the calciate structures in which they live. It is the largest stony coral in the Mediterranean, reaching up to 50 cm in diameter. C. caespitosa has an average generation length of about 30 years.

== Distribution and habitat ==
This species is endemic to the Mediterranean Sea, where it is attested already in the Upper Pliocene. It is common on rocky seabeds between a few metres and 60 metres in depth. In the marine lagoon of Veliko Jezero, in the marine reserve of Mljet island, Croatia, there is a small coral reef made up of C. caespitosa. It was believed to be the only true coral reef in the Mediterranean. Recent findings in the Adriatic Sea show that Cladocora caespitosa is not the only reef-building species of the Mediterranean Sea. An extensive corallith bed of C. caespitosa has been found in the Tremiti Islands Marine Protected Area.

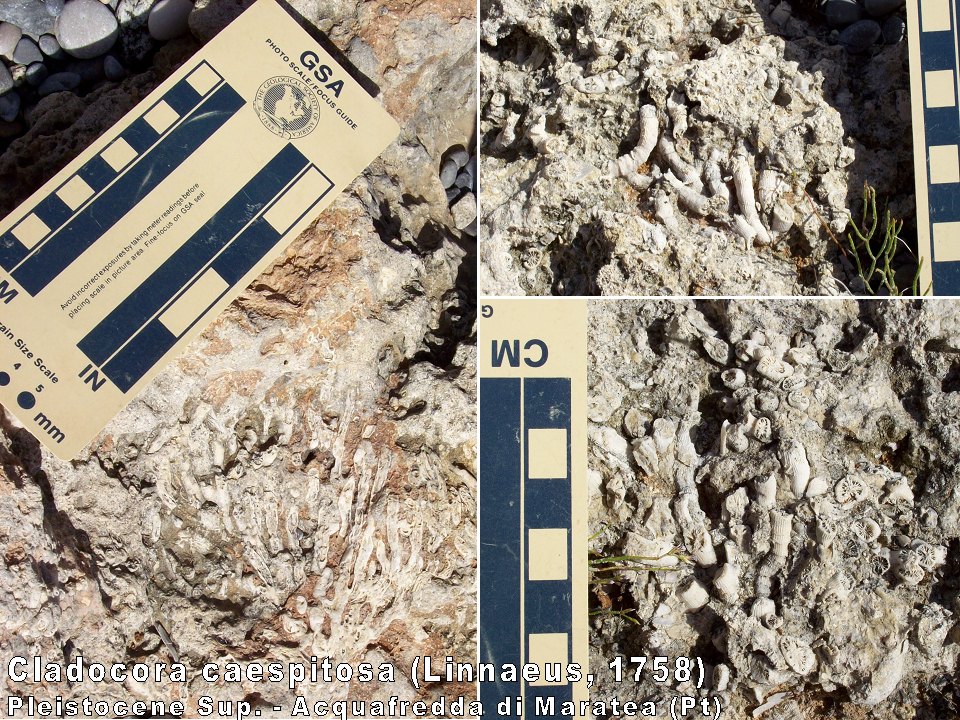
Fossil colony of Cladocora caespitosa from Acquafredda, Maratea, Potenza. Upper Pleistocene. The "bushy" form of the colony (left image), the external structure and the internal structure of the individuals (right images) are visible.

== Reproduction ==
The colonies grow through budding, but the species spreads through the settlement of plankton-like larva on seabed suited to colonisation.

== Threats ==
Cladocora caespitosa is classified as endangered under the IUCN red list, mostly based on recent mass die-offs caused by heat wave events in the Mediterranean.

== Bibliography ==
- Trainito, Egidio (2004). Atlante di flora e fauna del Mediterraneo (2004 ed.). Milano: Il Castello. ISBN 978-88-8039-395-5.
- Mojetta A.; Ghisotti A (2003). Flora e Fauna del Mediterraneo. Mondadori. ISBN 978-88-04-38574-5.
- Kružić, Petar; Požar-Domac, Antonieta (2003). "Banks of the coral Cladocora caespitosa (Anthozoa, Scleractinia) in the Adriatic Sea". Coral Reefs. 22 (4): 536. doi:10.1007/s00338-003-0345-y.
- Corriero, Giuseppe; Cataldo, Pierri (2019). "A Mediterranean mesophotic coral reef built by non-symbiotic scleractinians". Scientific Reports. 9 (3601): 18. Bibcode:2019NatSR...9.3601C. doi:10.1038/s41598-019-40284-4. PMC 6401148. PMID 30837650.
