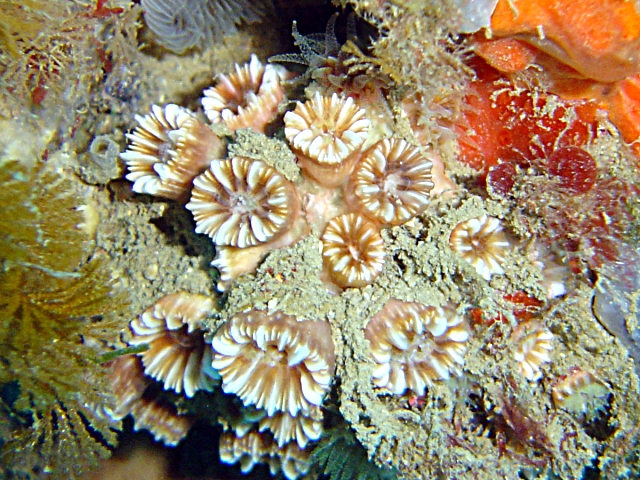
- Polycyathus muellerae

Scientific classification
- Kingdom: Animalia
- Phylum: Cnidaria
- Subphylum: Anthozoa
- Class: Hexacorallia
- Order: Scleractinia
- Suborder: Caryophylliina
- Family: Caryophylliidae; Dana, 1846

Synonyms
- Caryophylliinae Dana, 1846

= Caryophylliidae =

Family of stony corals

The Caryophylliidae are a family of stony corals found from the tropics to temperate seas, and from shallow to very deep water.

== Genera ==
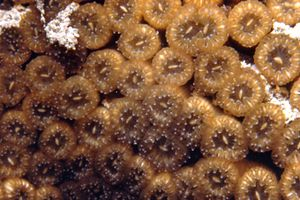
Cladocora caespitosa

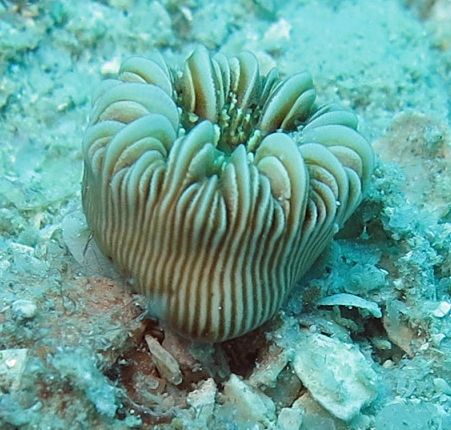
Heterocyathus aequicostatus

- Africana Ocana & Brito, 2015
- Anomocora Studer, 1878
- Asterosmilia † Duncan, 1867
- Aulocyathus Marenzeller, 1904
- Bathycyathus Milne-Edwards & Haime, 1848
- Bourneotrochus Wells, 1984
- Brachytrochus † Reuss, 1864
- Caryophyllia Lamarck, 1801
- Ceratotrochus Milne-Edwards & Haime, 1848
- Coelosimilia †
- Coenocyathus Milne-Edwards & Haime, 1848
- Coenosmilia Pourtalès, 1874
- Colangia Pourtalès, 1871
- Concentrotheca Cairns, 1979
- Confluphyllia Zibrowius & Cairns, 1997
- Conotrochus Sequenza, 1864
- Crispatotrochus Woods, 1878
- Dasmosmilia Pourtalès, 1880
- Dendrosmilia † Milne Edwards & Haime, 1848
- Desmophyllum Ehrenberg, 1834
- Discocyathus † Milne Edwards & Haime, 1848
- Ericiocyathus Zibrowius & Cairns, 1997
- Fimbriaphyllia Veron & Pichon, 1980
- Goniocorella Yabe & Eguchi, 1932
- Heterocyathus Milne-Edwards & Haime, 1848
- Hoplangia Gosse, 1860
- Labyrinthocyathus Cairns, 1979
- Leptocyathus † Milne Edwards & Haime, 1850
- Lochmaeotrochus Alcock, 1902
- Lophosmilia †
- Monohedotrochus Kitahara & Cairns, 2005
- Nomlandia Durham & Barnard, 1952
- Oxysmilia Duchassaing, 1870
- Paraconotrochus Cairns & Parker, 1992
- Paracyathus Milne-Edwards & Haime, 1848
- Parasmilia Milne Edwards & Haime, 1848
- Phacelocyathus Cairns, 1979
- Phyllangia Milne-Edwards & Haime, 1848
- Polycyathus Duncan, 1876
- Pourtalosmilia Duncan, 1884
- Premocyathus Yabe & Eguchi, 1942
- Rhizosmilia Cairns, 1978
- Solenosmilia Duncan, 1873
- Stephanocyathus Sequenza, 1864
- Sympodangia Zibrowius & Cairns, 1997
- Tethocyathus Kuhn, 1933
- Thalamophyllia Duchassaing, 1870
- Thecocyathus † Milne-Edwards & Haime, 1848
- Trochocyathus Milne-Edwards & Haime, 1848
- Trochosmilia † Milne Edwards & Haime, 1848
- Vaughanella Gravier, 1915

== Literature ==
- S. A. Fossa and A. J. Nilsen: Coral Reef Aquarium, Volume 4, Birgit Schmettkamp Verlag, Bornheim, ISBN 3-928819-05-4
