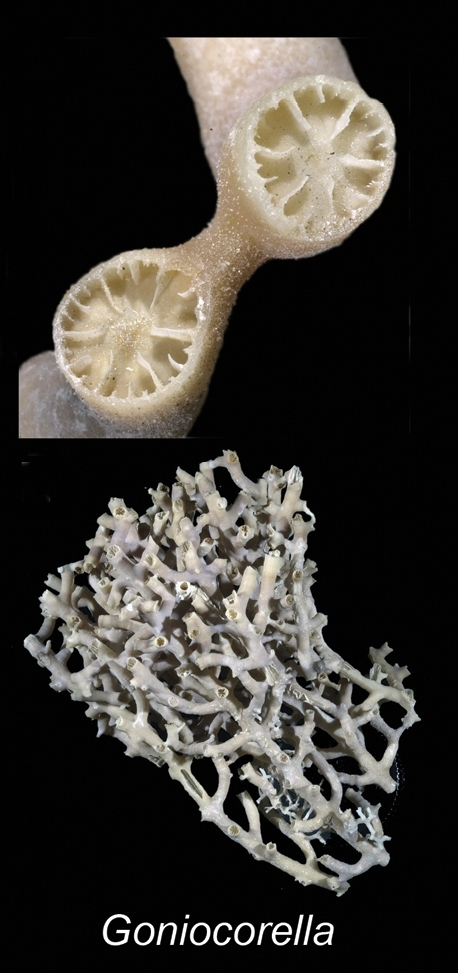
- Goniocorella dumosa

Scientific classification
- Domain: Eukaryota
- Kingdom: Animalia
- Phylum: Cnidaria
- Subphylum: Anthozoa
- Class: Hexacorallia
- Order: Scleractinia
- Family: Caryophylliidae
- Genus: Goniocorella; Yabe & Eguchi, 1932

= Goniocorella =

Genus of corals

Goniocorella is a genus of cnidarians belonging to the family Caryophylliidae.

The species of this genus are found in Southern Africa, Southeastern Asia and New Zealand.

Species:

- Goniocorella dumosa (Alcock, 1902)
- Goniocorella eguchii Wells, 1976
