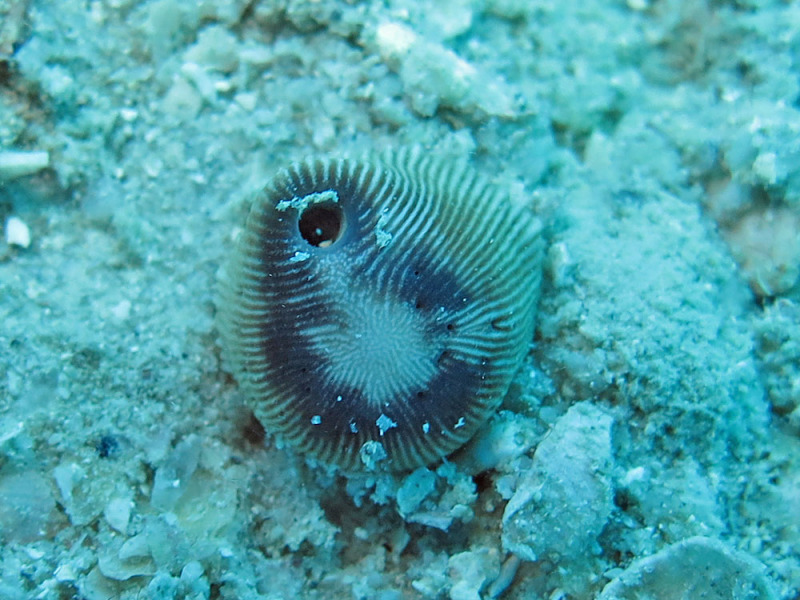
- A. muelleri inside the coral Heterocyathus aequicostatus

Scientific classification
- Kingdom: Animalia
- Phylum: Annelida
- Class: Sipuncula
- Order: Aspidosiphonida
- Family: Aspidosiphonidae
- Genus: Aspidosiphon
- Species: A. muelleri

Binomial name
- Aspidosiphon muelleri Diesing, 1851

Synonyms
- List: Aspidosiphon armatum Danielssen & Koren, 1880; Aspidosiphon clavatus (de Blainville, 1827); Aspidosiphon corallicola Sluiter, 1902; Aspidosiphon eremita Diesing, 1859; Aspidosiphon exhaustum Sluiter, 1912; Aspidosiphon heteropsammiae (Deshayes, 1863); Aspidosiphon hispitrofus Li Greci, 1980; Aspidosiphon imbellis Sluiter, 1902; Aspidosiphon inquilinus Sluiter, 1902; Aspidosiphon jukesii Baird, 1873; Aspidosiphon michelini (Deshayes, 1863); Aspidosiphon mirabilis Théel, 1875; Aspidosiphon pygmaeus Fischer, 1921; Aspidosiphon scutatum (Müller, 1844); Aspidosiphon tortus Selenka & Bülow in Selenka, de Man & Bülow, 1883; Cryptobia heteropsammiarum Deshayes, 1863; Cryptobia michelini Deshayes, 1863; Lesinia farcimen Schmidt, 1854; Paraspidosiphon pygmaeus (Fischer, 1921); Phascolosoma cochlearium (Valenciennes, 1854); Phascolosoma radiata Alder, 1860; Phascolosoma scutatum (Müller, 1844); Sipunculus scutatus Müller, 1844; Sipunculus cochlearius Valenciennes, 1854; Sipunculus clavatus de Blainville, 1827; Sipunculus cochlearius Valenciennes, 1854; Sipunculus heterocyathi McDonald, 1862

= Aspidosiphon muelleri =

Species of marine worm

Aspidosiphon muelleri is a species of unsegmented benthic marine worm in the class Sipuncula, the peanut worms. This worm is found in the eastern Atlantic Ocean, the Mediterranean Sea and in various locations in the Indo-Pacific region at depths down to about 1,000 m (3,300 ft).

== Description ==
Aspidosiphon muelleri has a cylindrical trunk and a narrower, cylindrical introvert at the front end which can retract back into the trunk. The oral disc is at the tip of the introvert; this has a terminal mouth and a cluster of ten to twelve short tentacles arranged in a crescent surrounding a nuchal organ. The introvert bears rings of tiny hooks at the front, and larger, more irregularly-placed hooks at the rear. At the front of the trunk is an anal shield and this acts as an operculum when the introvert is retracted. At the posterior of the trunk is the caudal shield; both it and the anal shield are rough and chitinised, with radial grooves and edged by wart-like papillae. This worm can grow to a length of 80 mm (3 in). The shields are dark in colour while the trunk is pale in small individuals, darkening to dark brown or blackish as they grow.

== Distribution and habitat ==
Aspidosiphon muelleri occurs in the Mediterranean Sea and the eastern Atlantic Ocean, its range extending from the Shetland Islands to West Africa. It is also found in scattered locations in the Indo-Pacific. Its depth range is from the lower part of the intertidal zone down to about 1,000 m (3,300 ft). It often occupies empty gastropod or tusk shells, or resides in serpulid tubes, holes or crevices, or among the branches of coralline algae or the deepwater coral Lophelia pertusa. In Australia it is reported as being an obligate commensal inside solitary, free-living corals such as Heterocyathus aequicostatus and Heteropsammia cochlea.

== Ecology ==
This peanut worm reproduces sexually, females becoming mature when about 5 mm (0.2 in) long. In the western Mediterranean Sea, the number of individuals build up over the summer months, with spawning taking place in August and September, when the sea temperature is nearing its maximum. After that, the number of individuals reduce again, likely because of the energy put into reproduction. When these worms occupy the tubes of polychaete worms, a small bivalve mollusc Epilepton clarkiae is often found living in association with them.
