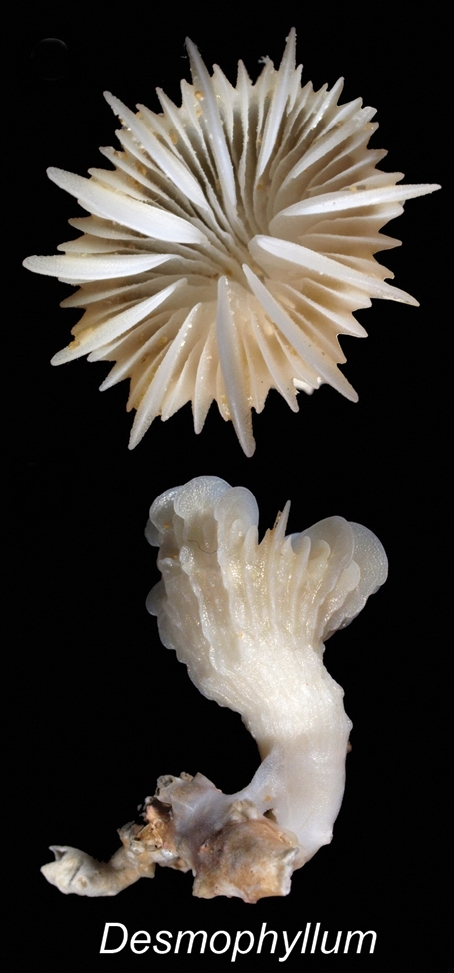
- Desmophyllum dianthus

Scientific classification
- Domain: Eukaryota
- Kingdom: Animalia
- Phylum: Cnidaria
- Class: Hexacorallia
- Order: Scleractinia
- Family: Caryophylliidae
- Genus: Desmophyllum; Ehrenberg, 1834

= Desmophyllum =

Genus of cnidarians

Desmophyllum is a genus of cnidarians belonging to the family Caryophylliidae.

The genus has cosmopolitan distribution.

D. dianthus is one of the most common deepwater corals. It lives at depths reaching 2,000 meters, in cold, dark water. Its polyps are solitary, reproducing only sexually, with sperm densities of less than 500/ml. The corals eat plankton and tiny shrimp with their stinging tentacles. They are found throughout the world’s oceans and provide habitat for deepwater fish and other species.

== Species ==
Species:

- Desmophyllum affine Seguenza, 1864
- Desmophyllum antiquatum Seguenza, 1864
- Desmophyllum cantamessi Zuffardi-Comerci, 1932
- Desmophyllum castellolense Álvarez-Pérez, 1997
- Desmophyllum clavatum Seguenza, 1864
- Desmophyllum compressum Seguenza, 1864
- Desmophyllum conulatum Osasco, 1897
- Desmophyllum coulsoni Wells, 1977
- Desmophyllum crassum Seguenza, 1864
- Desmophyllum cylindraceum Seguenza, 1864
- Desmophyllum decuplum Wells, 1977
- Desmophyllum defrancei (Milne Edwards & Haime, 1857)
- Desmophyllum dianthus (Esper, 1794)
- Desmophyllum edwardsianum Seguenza, 1864
- Desmophyllum ehrenbergianum Seguenza, 1864
- Desmophyllum elegans Seguenza, 1864
- Desmophyllum exclavatum Osasco, 1897
- Desmophyllum fungiaeforme Seguenza, 1864
- Desmophyllum gracile Seguenza, 1864
- Desmophyllum hourigani Cairns, 2021
- Desmophyllum joannense Dennant, 1902
- Desmophyllum laevicostatum Osasco, 1897
- Desmophyllum lirioides Wells, 1977
- Desmophyllum maximum Seguenza, 1864
- Desmophyllum miocenicum Seguenza, 1864
- Desmophyllum multicostatum Seguenza, 1864
- Desmophyllum orbiculare Seguenza, 1864
- Desmophyllum pedunculatum Seguenza, 1864
- Desmophyllum pertusum (Linnaeus, 1758)
- Desmophyllum quinarium Tenison-Woods, 1879
- Desmophyllum semicostatum Seguenza, 1864
- Desmophyllum stokesii Milne Edwards & Haime, 1848
- Desmophyllum striatum Michelotti, 1871
- Desmophyllum striatum Sismonda, 1871
- Desmophyllum sulcatum Seguenza, 1864
- Desmophyllum taurinense (Michelin, 1841)
- Desmophyllum willcoxi Gane, 1895
- Desmophyllum zancleum Seguenza, 1864
