= Louis François de Pourtalès =

American naturalist (1823–1880)

Count Louis François de Pourtalès
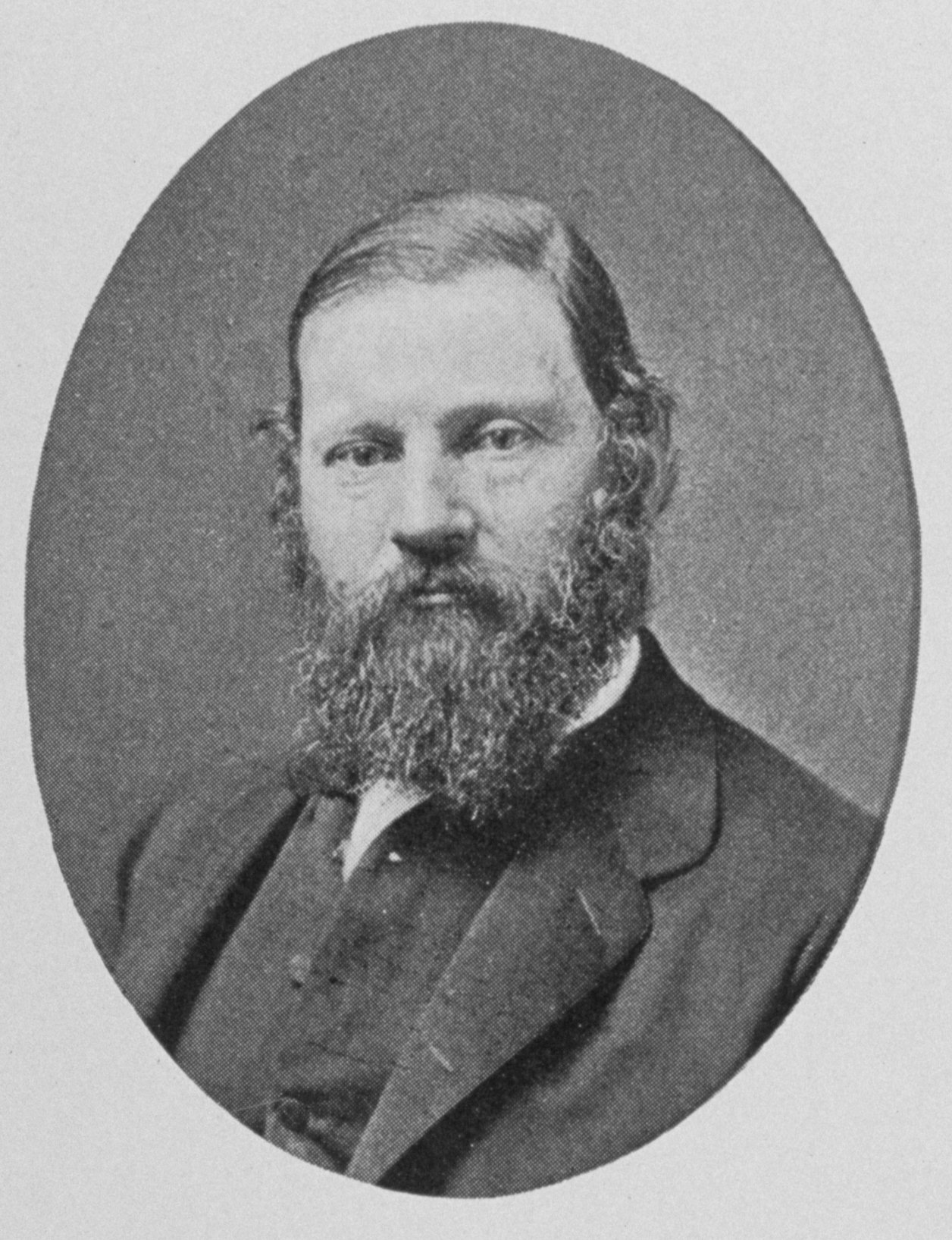
- Born: 4 March 1824; Neuchâtel, Switzerland
- Died: 18 July 1880 (aged 56); Cambridge, Massachusetts

Signature
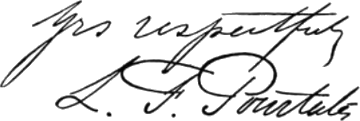

Louis François de Pourtalès (4 March 1824 – 18 July 1880) was a Franco-American naturalist, born at Neuchâtel, Switzerland.

== Early life and education ==
Pourtales was born on 4 March 1824 and regarded as a Swiss representative of an old family with lineage in France, Prussia, and Bohemia. After the death of his father, he succeeded to the title of Count and inherited a fortune that enabled his scientific pursuits.

He was educated as an engineer. He was regarded as an expert in mathematics, physics and zoology, and had interest in literature, poetry and history.

=== Death ===
Pourtales died on 18 July 1880 from an unspecified "obscure internal disease".

== Career ==
Pourtales was a pupil of Louis Agassiz, whom he accompanied in 1840 on glacial expeditions in the Alps and, in 1847, followed Agassiz to immigrate into the United States. In 1848, he entered government service with the United States Coast Survey and became profoundly interested in the deep sea. He made some of the first observations of the deep sea bottom and of globigerina.

In 1873 he became custodian of the Harvard Museum of Comparative Zoology, in which he had previously been assistant in zoology. He was later appointed Keeper of the Museum of Comparative Zoology and worked closely with the curator Alexander Agassiz. L. Agassiz attempted to get him a professorship.

In 1871, Pourtalès published one of his most famous works, Deep Sea Corals based on his memoirs as the first in the United States to undertake deep-sea dredging with USC&GS George S. Blake and was an authority on marine zoology. A second memoir was published on the results of the Hassler Expedition.

== Honors and awards ==
The name Pourtalesia was given to a genus of sea urchins as found by the Challenger expedition.

== Works ==
He published, under the auspices of the museum, several works, including:

- Contributions to the Fauna of the Gulf Stream at Great Depths. University Press. 1867–1868.
- Deep-Sea Corals. University Press: Welch, Bigelow, & Company. 1871.
- Echini, crinoids, and corals. University Press. 1876.
