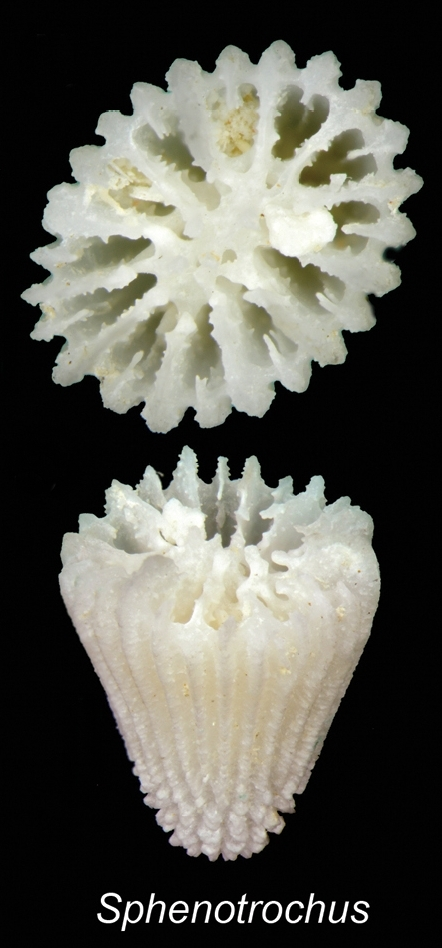
- Sphenotrochus (Spenotrochus) hancocki

Scientific classification
- Domain: Eukaryota
- Kingdom: Animalia
- Phylum: Cnidaria
- Subphylum: Anthozoa
- Class: Hexacorallia
- Order: Scleractinia
- Family: Turbinoliidae
- Genus: Sphenotrochus; Milne Edwards & Haime, 1848

= Sphenotrochus =

Genus of corals

Sphenotrochus is a genus of stony corals belonging to the family Turbinoliidae, and was first described in 1948 by Henri Milne-Edwards and Jules Haime.

The type species is the extinct Sphenotrochus crispus (Lamarck, 1816) †

== Species ==
The genus consists of two subgenera and several species, together with some extinct species:

- Subgenus Sphenotrochus (Eusthenotrochus) Wells, 1935
  1. Sphenotrochus (Eusthenotrochus) auritus Pourtalès, 1874
  2. Sphenotrochus (Eusthenotrochus) gilchristi Gardiner, 1905
- Subgenus Sphenotrochus (Sphenotrochus) Milne Edwards & Haime, 1848
  1. Sphenotrochus (Sphenotrochus) andrewianus Milne Edwards & Haime, 1848
  2. Sphenotrochus (Sphenotrochus) aurantiacus Marenzeller, 1904
  3. Sphenotrochus (Sphenotrochus) cairnsi Garberoglio, 2018
  4. Sphenotrochus (Sphenotrochus) evexicostatus Cairns in Cairns & Keller, 1993
  5. Sphenotrochus (Sphenotrochus) excavatus Tenison-Woods, 1878
  6. Sphenotrochus (Sphenotrochus) gardineri Squires, 1961
  7. Sphenotrochus (Sphenotrochus) hancocki Durham & Barnard, 1952
  8. Sphenotrochus (Sphenotrochus) imbricaticostatus Cairns in Cairns & Keller, 1993
  9. Sphenotrochus (Sphenotrochus) lindstroemi Cairns, 2000
  10. Sphenotrochus (Sphenotrochus) ralphae Squires, 1964
  11. Sphenotrochus (Sphenotrochus) squiresi Cairns, 1995
- Extinct species
  1. Sphenotrochus aschistus Squires, 1958 †
  2. Sphenotrochus boytonensis Tomes, 1888 †
  3. Sphenotrochus brassensis Vaughan, 1926 †
  4. Sphenotrochus cestasensis Chevalier, 1961 †
  5. Sphenotrochus claibornensis Vaughan, 1900 †
  6. Sphenotrochus crispus (Lamarck, 1816) †
  7. Sphenotrochus cuneolus Vincent, 1872 †
  8. Sphenotrochus davisi Thomas, 1942 †
  9. Sphenotrochus denhartogi Cairns, 2003 †
  10. Sphenotrochus dumasi Filliozat, 1914 †
  11. Sphenotrochus faudonensis Barta-Calmas, 1973 †
  12. Sphenotrochus fragarioides Wells, 1945 †
  13. Sphenotrochus granulatus Brünnich Nielsen, 1922 †
  14. Sphenotrochus granulosus (Defrance, 1828) †
  15. Sphenotrochus huttonianus Tenison-Woods, 1880 †
  16. Sphenotrochus intermedius (Münster, 1826) †
  17. Sphenotrochus javanus Gerth, 1933 †
  18. Sphenotrochus laculatus Squires, 1962 †
  19. Sphenotrochus latus Koenen, 1885 †
  20. Sphenotrochus milletianus (Defrance, 1828) †
  21. Sphenotrochus mixtus (Michelin, 1844) †
  22. Sphenotrochus nanus (Lea, 1833) †
  23. Sphenotrochus pharetra Rothpletz & Simonelli, 1890 †
  24. Sphenotrochus pulchellus Milne Edwards & Haime, 1848 †
  25. Sphenotrochus semigranosus (Michelin, 1844) †
  26. Sphenotrochus straini Turnšek, LeMone & Scott, 2003 †
  27. Sphenotrochus trinitatis Vaughan, 1926 †
  28. Sphenotrochus variolaris Tenison-Woods, 1878
  29. Sphenotrochus wellsi Cairns, 1997 †
