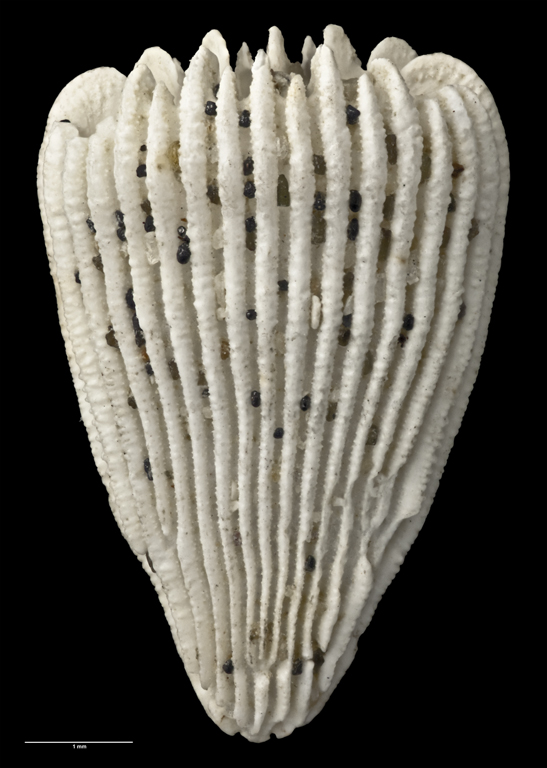
- Specimen AM MA72724-2

Scientific classification
- Domain: Eukaryota
- Kingdom: Animalia
- Phylum: Cnidaria
- Subphylum: Anthozoa
- Class: Hexacorallia
- Order: Scleractinia
- Family: Turbinoliidae
- Genus: Sphenotrochus
- Species: S. ralphae

Binomial name
- Sphenotrochus ralphae Squires, 1964

= Sphenotrochus (Sphenotrochus) ralphae =

Species of stony coral

Sphenotrochus ralphae is a species of stony coral belonging to the family Turbinoliidae, It belongs to the subgenus Sphenotrochus of the genus, Sphenotrochus. and was first described in 1964 by the American zoologist, Donald Fleming Squires, from a specimen trawled at 44 m depth, between Tryphena Harbour and Cape Barrier in New Zealand. The species epithet, ralphae, honours New Zealand marine biologist, Pat Ralph.

The coral is known only from the North Island of New Zealand.
