= Veretillum =

Scientific classification
- Kingdom: Animalia
- Phylum: Cnidaria
- Subphylum: Anthozoa
- Class: Octocorallia
- Order: Scleralcyonacea
- Family: Veretillidae
- Genus: Veretillum; Cuvier, 1798

Species
- 8 species, see text

Synonyms
- Policella Gray, 1870

Genus of marine invertebrates

Veretillum is a genus in the family Veretillidae. The genus contains bioluminescent species.

== Phylogeny ==
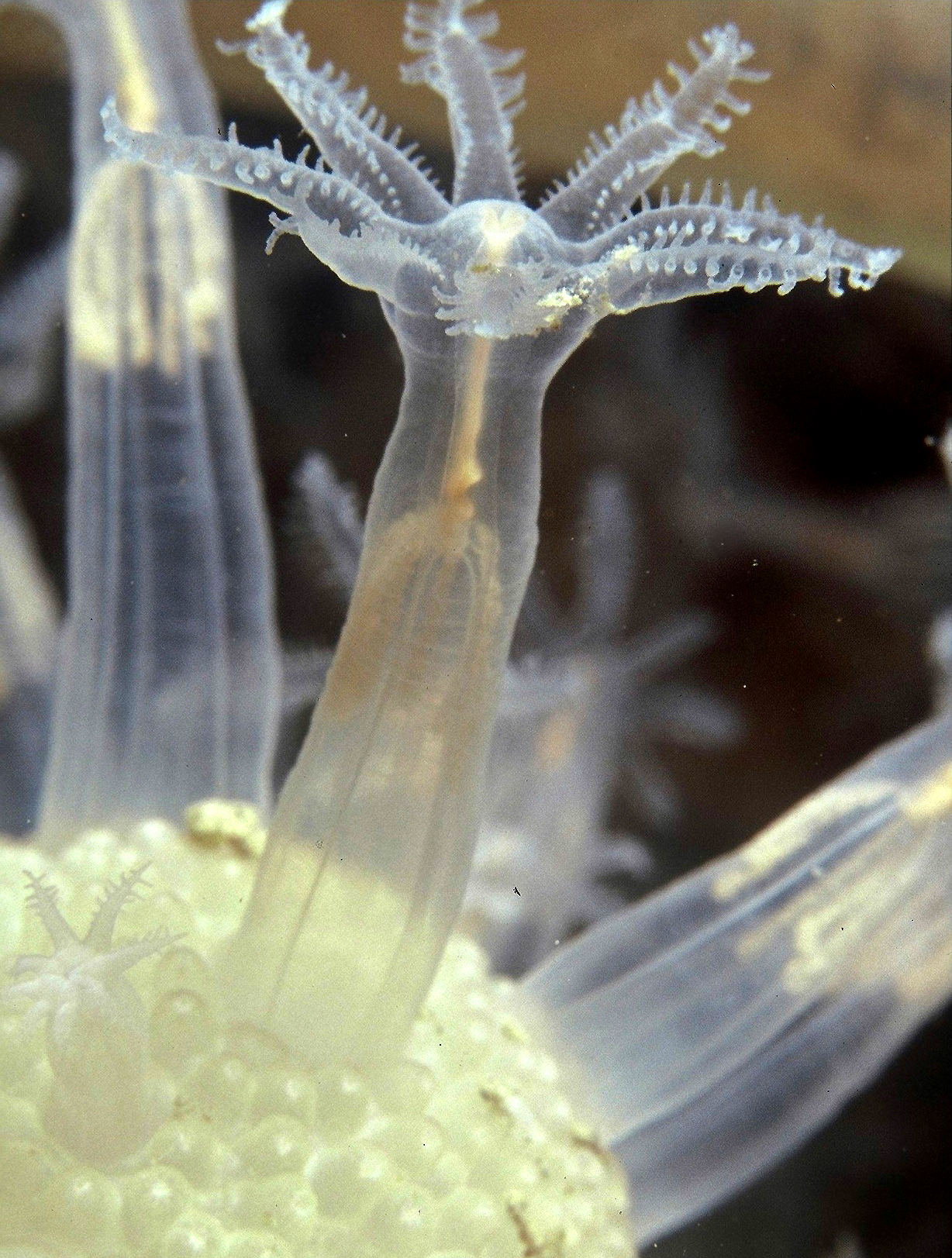
Veretillum cynomorium

The cladogram is as follows:

- Veretillidae
  - Veretillum
    - Veretillum australis (Gray, 1870)
    - Veretillum cynomorium (Pallas, 1766)
    - Veretillum leloupi (Tixier-Durivault, 1960)
    - Veretillum malayense (Hickson, 1916)
    - Veretillum manillensis (Kölliker, 1872)
    - Veretillum tenue (Marshall & Fowler, 1889)
    - Veretillum vanderbilti (Boone, 1938)
    - Kophobelemnon clavatum
  - Amphibelemnon (López-González, Gili & Williams, 2000)
  - Bensonularia † (Hamilton, 1958)
  - Cavernularia (Milne Edwards & Haime, 1850)
  - Cavernulina (Kükenthal & Broch, 1911)
  - Lituaria (Milne Edwards & Haime, 1850)
