= Cavernularia elegans =

Scientific classification
- Domain: Eukaryota
- Kingdom: Animalia
- Phylum: Cnidaria
- Class: Octocorallia
- Order: Pennatulacea
- Family: Veretillidae
- Genus: Cavernularia
- Species: C. elegans

Binomial name
- Cavernularia elegans (Herklots, 1858)

Species of coral

Cavernularia elegans is a species of coral in the family Veretillidae found in the North Atlantic Ocean.
