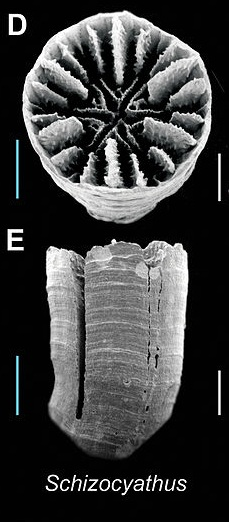
- D = calyx from above E = lateral view

Scientific classification
- Kingdom: Animalia
- Phylum: Cnidaria
- Subphylum: Anthozoa
- Class: Hexacorallia
- Order: Scleractinia
- Family: Schizocyathidae
- Genus: Schizocyathus; Pourtalès, 1874
- Species: S. fissilis

Binomial name
- Schizocyathus fissilis Pourtalès, 1874

= Schizocyathus =

Genus of corals

Schizocyathus is a monotypic genus of stony corals in the family Schizocyathidae, the only species being Schizocyathus fissilis. It is a deep water, azooxanthellate coral.

== Description ==
Schizocyathus fissilis is a solitary species of stony coral. The single corallite can grow to a height of 25 millimetres (1 in) and a diameter of 3.5 millimetres (0.1 in). It is often horn-shaped. The septa are arranged in groups of six in three cycles. There are sometimes palliform lobes on the inner margins of the septa but the columella is weakly developed.

== Distribution ==
Schizocyathus fissilis is found in the Atlantic Ocean and the Caribbean Sea. Its range includes the coast of Florida, the Gulf of Mexico, Bermuda, Antilles and Brazil, and in the eastern Atlantic, the Azores, Portugal and Morocco. Its depth range is 88 to 3,438 metres (300 to 11,300 ft).

== Biology ==
Schizocyathus fissilis is an azooxanthellate coral which does not harbour symbiotic zooxanthellae in its tissues. It feeds by extending its tentacles to catch plankton and by absorbing organic matter from the water.

Sexual reproduction takes place with the liberation of sperm and eggs into the water column. The planula larvae drift with the currents, and when fully developed, settle on the seabed and undergo metamorphosis into polyps which secrete their own calcium carbonate skeletons. Additionally, Schizocyathus fissilis has an unusual method of asexual reproduction known as parricidal budding. This is a process in which a new polyp develops on the inner surface of a fragment of a parent corallite that has split apart longitudinally.
