= Coral Reefs =

- Subject: Coral reefs
- Language: English
- Edited by: Morgan Pratchett

Publication details
- History: 1982–present
- Publisher: Springer Science+Business Media
- Frequency: Quarterly
- Impact factor: 3.6 (2018)

Standard abbreviations
- ISO 4: Coral Reefs

Indexing
- ISSN: 0722-4028 (print); 1432-0975 (web)
- LCCN: 83640864
- OCLC no.: 1039357570

Links
- Journal homepage; Online archive

Coral Reefs is a quarterly peer-reviewed scientific journal dedicated to the study of coral reefs. It was established in 1982 and is published by Springer Science+Business Media on behalf of the International Society for Reef Studies, of which it is the official journal. This journal also acts as the International Coral Reef Society. The editor-in-chief is Morgan Pratchett (James Cook University). According to the Journal Citation Reports, the journal has a 2017 impact factor of 3.095. According to Springer the journal has a 2020 impact factor of 3.902, five year impact factor of 3.880, and as of 2021 has 454,744 downloads.
