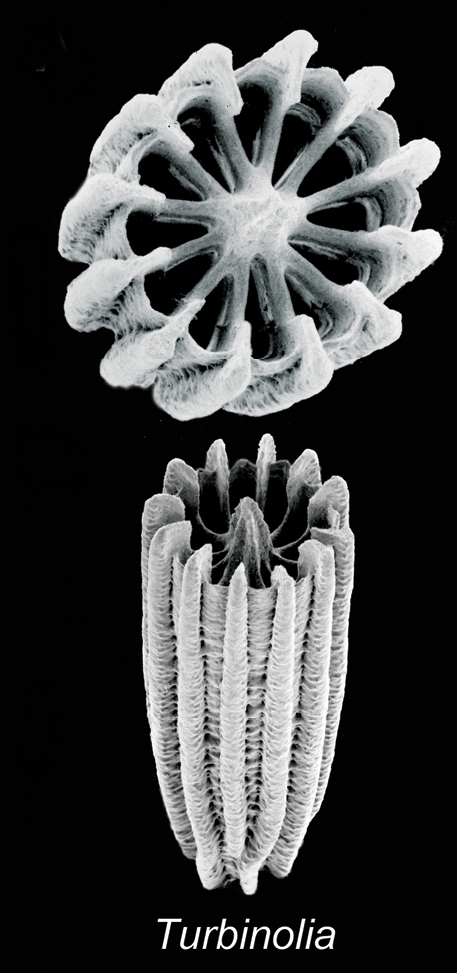
- Turbinolia stephensoni

Scientific classification
- Kingdom: Animalia
- Phylum: Cnidaria
- Subphylum: Anthozoa
- Class: Hexacorallia
- Order: Scleractinia
- Family: Turbinoliidae
- Genus: Turbinolia; Lamarck, 1816

= Turbinolia =

Genus of corals

Turbinolia is a genus of corals belonging to the family Turbinoliidae.

The genus has almost cosmopolitan distribution.

== Species ==
The species listed here are recognized as valid or provisionally accepted by the World Register of Marine Species (WoRMS):

=== Extant species ===
- Turbinolia stephensoni (Wells, 1959)
- Turbinolia italica Michelotti, 1838
- Turbinolia acuticostata Vaughan, 1895
- Turbinolia arcotensis Forbes, 1846
- Turbinolia atalayensis d’Archiac, 1847

=== Fossil species ===
The genus Turbinolia has a presence in the fossil record dating from the Cretaceous to the Miocene periods, with many extinct species cataloged in paleontological resources like the Paleobiology Database and Mindat.
