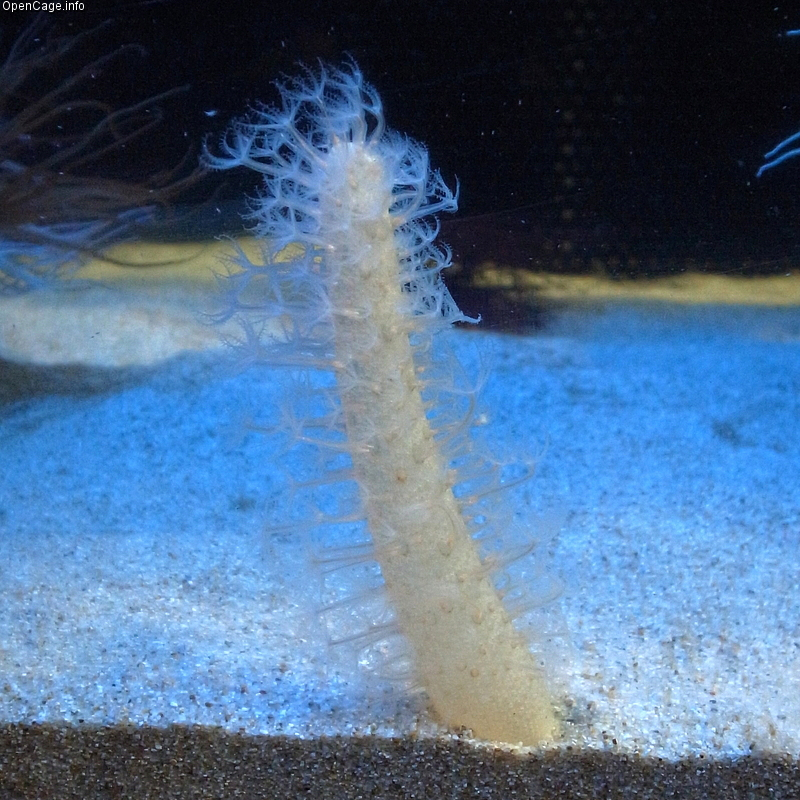
- Cavernularia obesa

Scientific classification
- Kingdom: Animalia
- Phylum: Cnidaria
- Subphylum: Anthozoa
- Class: Octocorallia
- Order: Scleralcyonacea
- Family: Veretillidae
- Genus: Cavernularia
- Species: C. obesa

Binomial name
- Cavernularia obesa (Milne Edwards & Haime, 1850)

= Cavernularia obesa =

Species of coral

== Taxonomy ==
Cavernularia obesa, also known as the sea cactus, are colonial marine cnidarians in the class Octocorallia which includes all soft-bodied corals like gorgonians and sea whips. C. obesa belongs in the order Pennatulacea which are also known as sea pens.

Pennatuloids can be distinguished from other octocorals by a basal peduncle anchoring colonies into the substrate. Their colonies are also made up of different types of polyps, including autozooids, siphonozooids, and acrozooids.

Cavernularia obesa is different from other Pennatuloids because of several unique characteristics. They exhibit an elongated ellipsoidal body shape as well as eightfold radial symmetry and eight tentacles.

== Habitat and geographic distribution ==
Cavernularia obesa is widely distributed and found in the northeastern Pacific Ocean as well as on the coast of southern Japan. They inhabit sandy shores, mudflats, silty bottoms, and rocky outcrops. They also help structure benthic communities providing a habitat for other invertebrates and fish from shallow intertidal regions to depths of 6,100 meters.

== Circadian rhythm ==
The species adjusts its behavior based on a light-dark cycle as well as a temperature cycle. During the day, they contract and bury themselves into the sediment while at night, they expand and rise above the surface becoming more active when the temperature is around 25°C.

== Reproduction and life cycle ==
In C. obesa, both males and females release sperm and eggs into the water which is controlled by light and not each other. Even if males and females were to be separated, they would still follow the same timing meaning their external fertilization is driven by the environment and not by their communication.

Sea pens have a two-phase life cycle of planktonic larvae and sessile adult forms. Mature adults are half-buried in the sediments relying on planktonic larvae for the spreading and distribution of their species.

== Diet ==
C. obesa mainly feed on small plankton though studies have shown that their diet does not directly influence its patterns of activity. While their diet is crucial for growth and survival, environmental factors such as light and temperature play a much more important role in controlling their behavior.

== Bioluminescence ==
C. obesa emits green and blue light which was determined to be 2-(p-hydroxyphenylacetamido)- 3-benzyl-5-(p-hydroxyphenyl)pyrazine. Bioluminescence in sea pens is most likely used for defense and to startle or ward off potential predators. Anthozoans contain luciferase and photoprotein which both help to produce the light in the sea cactus unlike hydrozoans who do not use a luciferase-based system. C. obesa has an unexpectedly weak activity of luciferase which suggests they need a special type of environmental condition or function in order to glow brightly.
