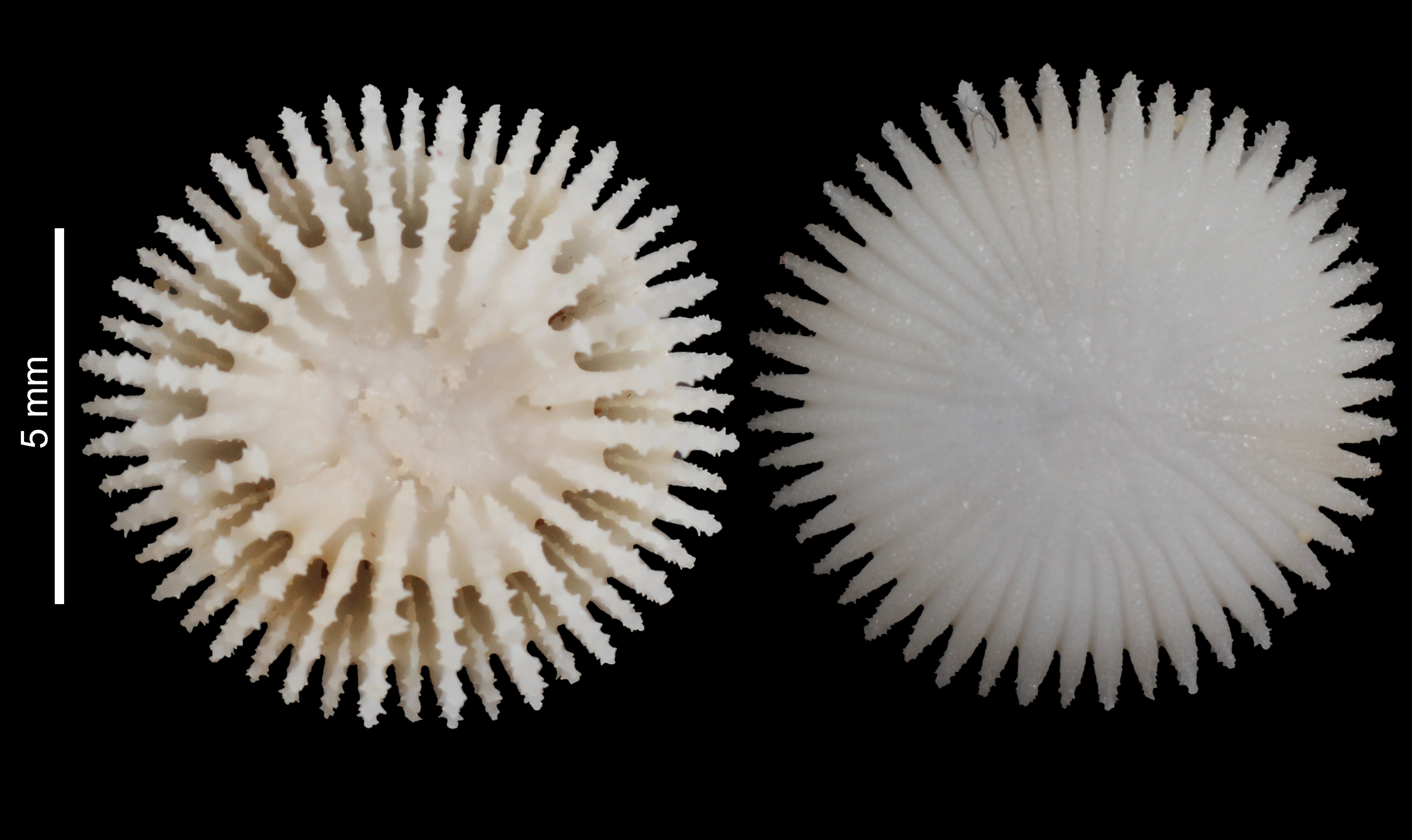
- Anthemiphyllia patera

Scientific classification
- Domain: Eukaryota
- Kingdom: Animalia
- Phylum: Cnidaria
- Class: Hexacorallia
- Order: Scleractinia
- Family: Anthemiphylliidae
- Genus: Anthemiphyllia; Pourtalès, 1878

= Anthemiphyllia =

Genus of corals

Anthemiphyllia is a genus of corals within the family Anthemiphylliidae. There are currently 8 extant and 2 extinct species assigned to the genus.

== Species ==
- † Anthemiphyllia catinata Wells, 1977
- Anthemiphyllia dentata (Alcock, 1902)
- Anthemiphyllia frustum Cairns, 1994
- Anthemiphyllia grossa Kitahara & Cairns, 2021
- Anthemiphyllia macrolobata Cairns, 1999
- Anthemiphyllia multidentata Cairns, 1999
- Anthemiphyllia pacifica Vaughan, 1907
- † Anthemiphyllia patella Gerth, 1921
- Anthemiphyllia patera Pourtalès, 1878
- Anthemiphyllia spinifera Cairns, 1999
