= Cavernularia =

Cavernularia may refer to:

- Cavernularia (lichen), a genus of lichenised ascomycetes in the large family Parmeliaceae
- Cavernularia (cnidarian), a genus of marine cnidarians in the family Veretillidae
