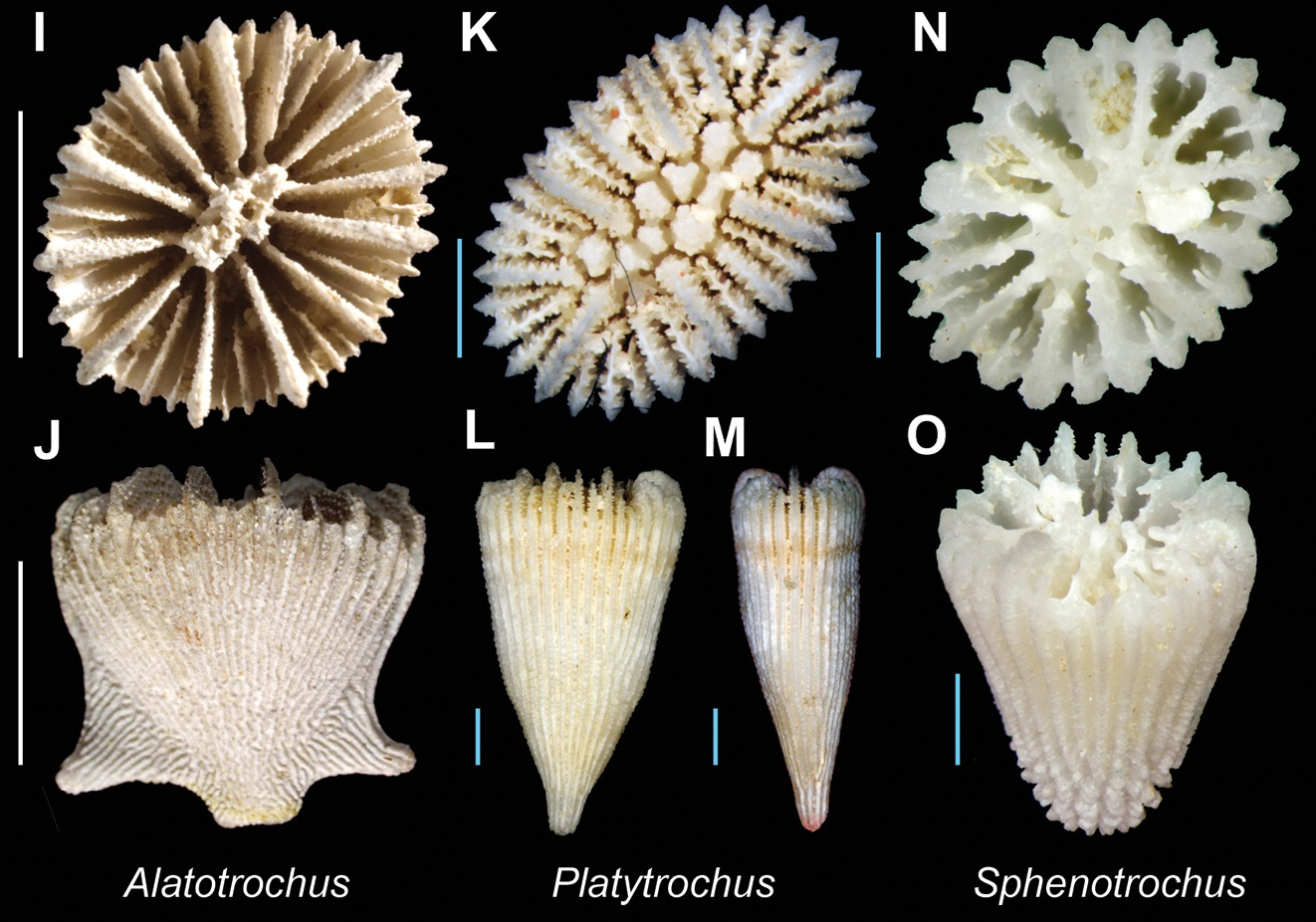

Scientific classification
- Kingdom: Animalia
- Phylum: Cnidaria
- Subphylum: Anthozoa
- Class: Hexacorallia
- Order: Scleractinia
- Family: Turbinoliidae; Milne-Edwards & Haime, 1848

Genera
- See text

Synonyms
- Turbinoliinae Milne Edwards & haime, 1848

= Turbinoliidae =

Family of corals

Turbinoliidae is a family of reef building stony corals.

== Genera ==
- Alatotrochus Cairns, 1994
- Australocyathus Cairns & Parker, 1992
- †Blagrovia Duncan, 1880
- Conocyathus d'Orbigny, 1849
- Cryptotrochus Cairns, 1988
- Cyathotrochus Bourne, 1905
- Deltocyathoides Yabe & Eguchi, 1932
- Dunocyathus Tenison-Woods, 1878
- Endocyathopora Cairns, 1989
- Foveolocyathus Cairns, 1997
- Holcotrochus Dennant, 1902
- Idiotrochus Wells, 1935
- Kionotrochus Dennant, 1906
- Lissotrochus Cairns, 2004
- Notocyathus Tenison-Woods, 1880
- Peponocyathus Gravier, 1915
- Platytrochus Milne Edwards & Haime, 1848
- Pleotrochus Cairns, 1997
- †Pleuropodia Dennant, 1903
- Pseudocyathoceras Cairns, 1991
- Sphenotrochus Milne Edwards & Haime, 1848
- Thrypticotrochus Cairns, 1989
- Trematotrochus Tenison-Woods, 1879
- Tropidocyathus Milne Edwards & Haime, 1848
- Turbinolia Lamarck, 1816
