= Corals of the World (website) =

Web-based database of zooxanthellate Scleractinia (stony corals)

- Website type: Scientific website
- Available in: English
- Creators: J. E. N. Veron; M. Stafford-Smith; E. Turak; L.M. DeVantier
- Website: Corals of the World
- Commercial: No
- Registration: Optional
- Launched: 2016; 10 years ago
- Current status: Online

Corals of the World Online, or simply Corals of the World, is an open access website aiming to become a fully comprehensive and up-to-date reference on the subjects of coral taxonomy, biogeography and identification. It is focused only on the group of zooxanthellate Scleractinia, also called stony corals, the order of Cnidaria that is the main builder of coral reefs.

This website was created by J. E. N. Veron (also known as "Charlie" Veron), an Australian biologist expert, pioneer in the study of corals, and Mary Stafford-Smith, with the collaboration of Lyndon DeVantier, Emre Turak, and the contributions of many others from around the world. Its beta version was put online in 2016.

The Corals of the World website expands on the content of the three-volume book Corals of the World by Veron and Stafford-Smith, itself a well established reference on the topic, both in academia and in the reef aquarism industry.

The governmental research center Australian Institute of Marine Science includes the website in its Data Repository as a resource for research, conservation, education, and policy-making.

The development of the site is sponsored by the Corals of the World Foundation, a non-profit organization.

Given that the website is freely accessible to all, it can be considered not only very useful for scientists, but also for serious reef aquarists who wish to deepen their knowledge of stony corals.

== See also ==
- World Register of Marine Species (WoRMS)
- Census of Marine Life (CoML)
- Ocean Biogeographic Information System (OBIS)
- International Commission on Zoological Nomenclature (ICZN)
