= John Veron =

Australian marine biologist

John Veron OAM
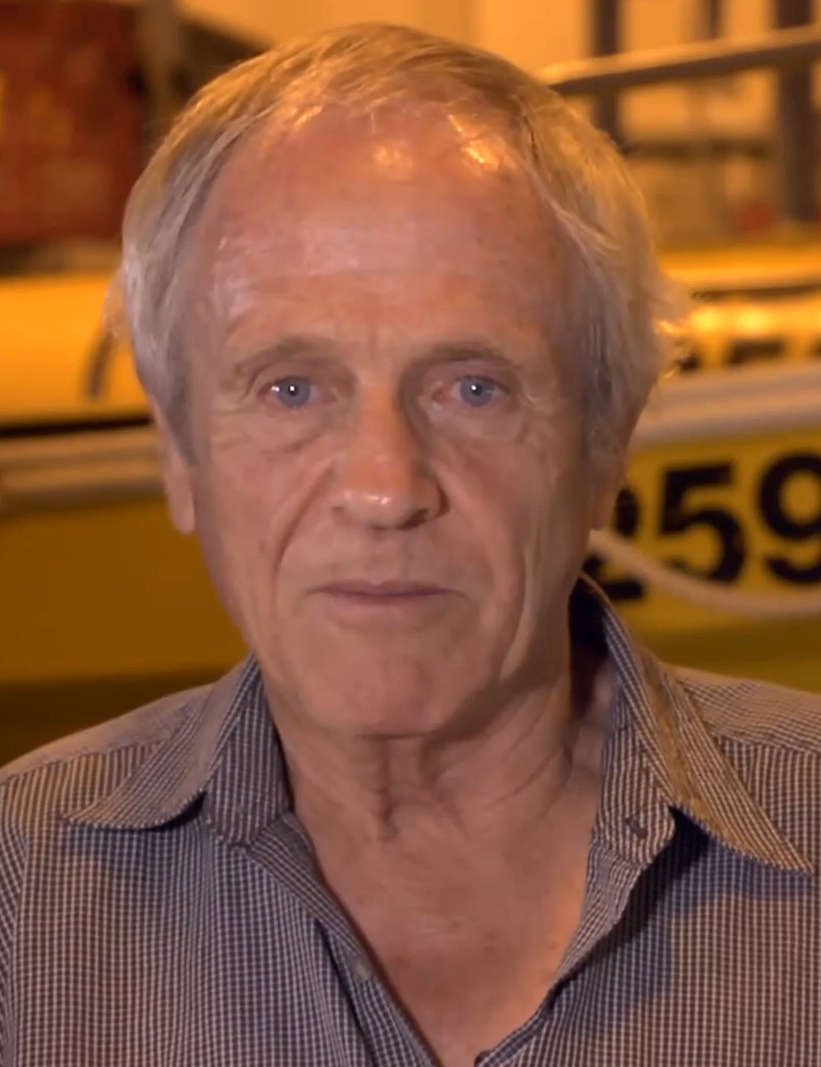
- John Veron in 2015
- Born: John Edward Norwood Veron; 1945 (age 80–81); Sydney, Australia
- Education: University of New England (B.A. (Hons) (M.Sc.) (Ph.D.)
- Known for: Discovery of the Coral Triangle; Application of reticulate evolution to marine biology; Substantial contributions to coral taxonomy
- Scientific career
- Fields: marine biology; marine zoology; cnidariology
- Workplaces: American Academy of Underwater Sciences; Australian Marine Sciences Association; Australian Institute of Marine Science; International Society for Reef Studies; James Cook University
- Author abbrev. (zoology): J. E. N. Veron

John Edward Norwood Veron OAM (born 1945), credited in research as J. E. N. Veron, and in other writing as Charlie Veron, is an Australian biologist, taxonomist, and specialist in the study of corals and reefs. He has described 173 of the world's coral species.

== Early life and education ==
John Edward Norwood Veron (known as "Charlie" due to his interest in the natural sciences at school) was born in 1945 in Sydney, New South Wales, Australia. He attended Barker College in Sydney.

He won a Commonwealth scholarship as a gifted student and went on study at the University of New England. His main interests were in the natural world, especially marine life. He participated in the scuba club while at university.

His honours thesis was on the behaviour of gliding possums. He took his M.Sc. with a study on the temperature regulation of lizards. Veron completed his PhD with a study on the neurophysiology of dragonflies, awarded in 1971.

== Career ==
After completing his PhD, Veron was offered a postdoctoral position at James Cook University to study corals. He was the first full-time researcher on the Great Barrier Reef (1972) and the first scientist employed by the Australian Institute of Marine Science (1974). He participated in 67 expeditions to all the major reef provinces in the world. He credited "Red" Gilmartin and John W. Wells from Cornell University as key figures in clarifying his interest in taxonomy in the 1970s.

Veron has named 173 reef corals and built a taxonomic framework for corals that is used throughout the world.

He founded the Orpheus Island Marine Station. He introduced the concept of reticulate evolution to the field of coral taxonomy.

== Recognition ==
In 2009, Sir David Attenborough introduced Veron's lecture to the Royal Society.

He was featured in the 2017 documentary Chasing Coral.

A sculpture of Veron, called "The Godfather of Coral", was created by Jason deCaires Taylor for the Museum of Underwater Art as part of the Ocean Sentinels above the surface exhibition in 2022.

He has received many professional awards, including:

- Scientific Diving Lifetime Achievement Award (American Academy of Underwater Sciences)
- Darwin Medal, 2004 (International Society for Reef Studies)
- Silver Jubilee Pin (Australian Marine Sciences Association)
- Medal of the Order of Australia for "service to marine research", 2021
- Ocean Sentinel sculpture (Museum of Underwater Art)

== Other activities and achievements ==
Since 2008 Veron and several colleagues have been producing an open access website about coral taxonomy, biogeography and identification, Corals of The World. The website includes a mapping program called Coral Geographic and an identification program called CoralID.

He has campaigned extensively on climate change, mass bleaching of coral reefs, ocean acidification, and related environmental issues.

== Publications ==
Veron has written many books and monographs about corals and coral reefs, including:

- Veron, Charlie (2017). A Life Underwater. Penguin Random House Australia. ISBN 9781760143633.
- Veron, John Edward Norwood (2008). A Reef in Time: The Great Barrier Reef from Beginning to End. Harvard University Press. ISBN 9780674026797.
- Veron, John Edward Norwood (2000). Corals of the world. Australian Institute of Marine Science.
- Veron, John Edward Norwood (1992). Hermatypic corals of Japan. Australian Institute of Marine Science. ISBN 9780642170835.
- Veron, John Edward Norwood (1995). Corals in Space and Time: The Biogeography and Evolution of the Scleractinia. Cornell University Press. ISBN 0801482631.
- Veron, John Edward Norwood (1993). Corals of Australia and the Indo-Pacific. University of Hawaii Press. ISBN 9780824815042.
- Veron, John Edward Norwood; Pichon, Michel (1976). Scleractinia of Eastern Australia. Australian Government Publishing Service. ISBN 9780642023209.
