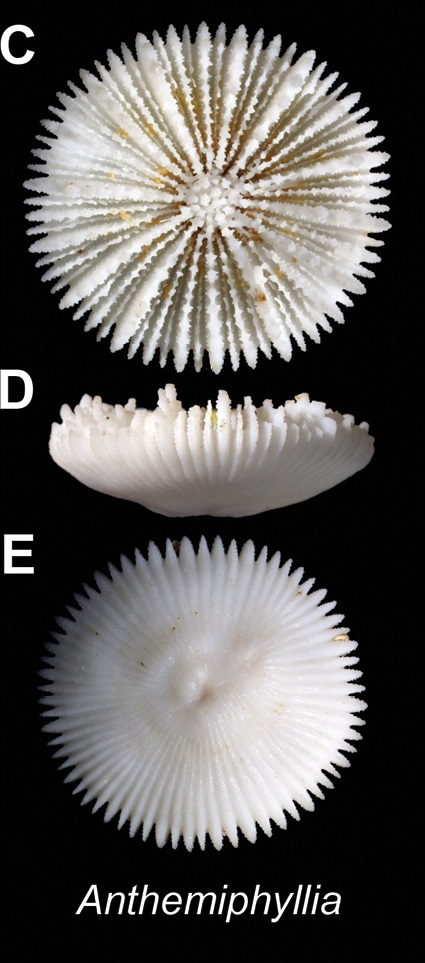
- Anthemiphyllia dentata

Scientific classification
- Kingdom: Animalia
- Phylum: Cnidaria
- Subphylum: Anthozoa
- Class: Hexacorallia
- Order: Scleractinia
- Family: Anthemiphylliidae

= Anthemiphylliidae =

Family of corals

Anthemiphylliidae is a family of corals belonging to the order Scleractinia.

Genera:

- Anthemiphyllia Pourtalès, 1878
