= Nancy Knowlton =

American biologist

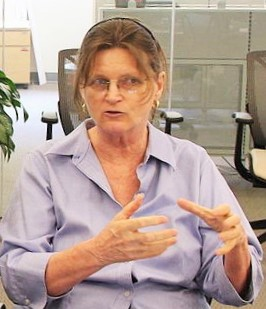
- Nancy Knowlton at World Oceans Day in 2015
- Education: Ph.D. University of California, Berkeley; Harvard University
- Spouse: Jeremy Jackson (m. 1983)
- Children: 2
- Awards: Leopold Leadership Fellow (1999); Benchley Award for Science (2009); Heinz Award with special focus on the environment (2011): Darwin Medal (2020)
- Scientific career
- Fields: Coral reef biologist
- Workplaces: University of California, San Diego; Smithsonian Institution

Nancy Knowlton is a coral reef biologist and a former Sant Chair for Marine Science at the Smithsonian National Museum of Natural History.

== Life ==
She graduated from Harvard University, and from the University of California, Berkeley, with a PhD. She was a professor at Yale University, then joined the Smithsonian Tropical Research Institute in Panama.

She is an adjunct professor of marine biology at the Scripps Institution of Oceanography. While at Scripps, Knowlton also founded the Center for Marine Biodiversity and Conservation. She was named an Aldo Leopold Leadership Fellow in 1999 and was elected to the Board of the American Association for the Advancement of Science (AAAS) in 2008. She also serves as one of three co-chairs for the coral reef Census of Marine Life.

She is the author of the book Citizens of the Sea which was published by National Geographic in 2010 to celebrate the end of the Census of Marine Life. In 2011, Knowlton received the 17th Annual Heinz Award with special focus on the environment. Knowlton was elected a member of the US National Academy of Sciences in 2013. She was awarded the Darwin Medal by the International Coral Reef Society in 2020.

== Select publications ==
- Knowlton, N. 2008. "Coral reefs". Current Biology 18: R18-R21.
- Knowlton, N. and J. B. C. Jackson. 2008. "Shifting baselines, local impacts, and global change on coral reefs". PLoS Biology 6: e54, 6 pp.
- Hoegh-Guldberg, O., P. J. Mumby, A. J. Hooten, R. S. Steneck, P. Greenfield, E. Gomez, C. D. Harvell, P. F. Sale, A. J. Edwards, K. Caldeira, N. Knowlton, C. M. Eakin, R. Iglesias-Prieto, N. Muthiga, R. H. Bradbury, A. Dubi, and M. E. Hatziolos. 2007. "Coral reefs under rapid climate change and ocean acidification". Science 318: 1737-1742.
- Knowlton, N. 2004. "Multiple “stable” states and the conservation of marine ecosystems". Progress in Oceanography. 60: 387-396.
- Fukami, H., A. F. Budd, G. Paulay, A. Solé-Cava, C. A. Chen, K. Iwao, and N. Knowlton. 2004. "Conventional taxonomy obscures deep divergence between Pacific and Atlantic corals". Nature 427: 832-835.
- Rohwer, F., V. Seguritan, F. Azam, and N. Knowlton 2002. "High diversity and species-specific distribution of coral-associated bacteria". Marine Ecology Progress Series 243: 1-10.
- Knowlton, N. 2001. "The future of coral reefs." Proceedings of the National Academy of Sciences of the United States of America 98:5419-5425.
- Williams, S. T. and N. Knowlton. 2001. "Mitochondrial pseudogenes are pervasive and often insidious in the snapping shrimp genus Alpheus". Molecular Biology and Evolution 18:1484-1493.
- Knowlton, N. 2000. "Molecular genetics analyses of species boundaries in the sea". Hydrobiologia 420:73-90.
- Herre, A., N. Knowlton, U. Mueller and S. Rehner. 1999. "The evolution of mutualisms: Exploring the paths between conflict and cooperation". Trends in Ecology and Evolution 14:49-53.
