= Jeremy Jackson (scientist) =

American ecologist, paleobiologist, and conservationist

Jeremy Bradford Cook Jackson
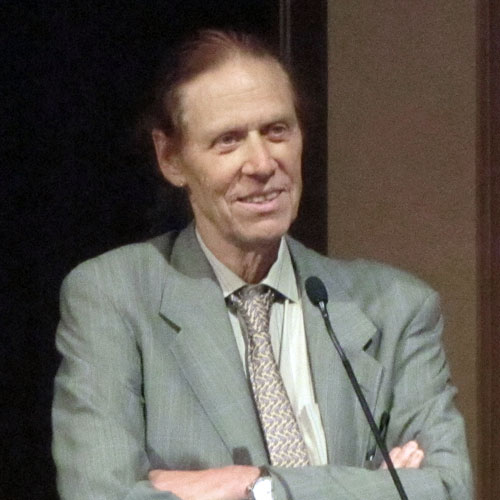
- Jeremy B.C. Jackson presenting at the National Museum of Natural History in Washington, D.C., on June 6, 2010
- Born: Jeremy Bradford Cook Jackson; November 13, 1942 (age 83); Louisville, Kentucky
- Education: Ph.D. Yale University, 1971; George Washington University
- Spouse: Nancy Knowlton (m. 1983)
- Children: 2
- Awards: Benchley Award for Science (2009); Harvard Museum of Natural History Roger Tory Peterson Medal (2008); Edward T. LaRoe Memorial Award for Outstanding Contributions to Conservation Biology (2007); International Award for Research in Ecology and conservation Biology of the BBVA Foundation, Madrid (2007)
- Scientific career
- Fields: Marine Biologist, Paleontologist, Conservationist
- Workplaces: University of California, San Diego; Smithsonian Institution

Jeremy Bradford Cook Jackson (born November 13, 1942) is an American ecologist, paleobiologist, and conservationist. He is an emeritus professor at the Scripps Institution of Oceanography, senior scientist emeritus at the Smithsonian Institution, and visiting scientist at the American Museum of Natural History Center for Biodiversity and Conservation. He studies threats and solutions to human impacts on the environment and the ecology and evolution of tropical seas. Jackson has more than 170 scientific publications and 11 books, with nearly 40,000 citations listed on Google Scholar.

He has lectured widely about the environmental crisis, including his TED talk "How we wrecked the oceans" that has been viewed over half a million times. Jackson is a Fellow of the American Association for the Advancement of Science and the American Academy of Arts and Sciences.

He has received more than a dozen prizes and awards including the BBVA International Prize in Ecology and Conservation, the Paleontological Medal, and the Darwin Medal of the International Society for Reef Studies. Jackson's work on the collapse of coastal ecosystems was chosen by Discover magazine as the outstanding scientific achievement of 2001. His book Breakpoint: Reckoning with America's Environmental Crises (co-author Steve Chapple) was released by Yale in April 2018.

== Biography ==
Jackson was born in Louisville, Kentucky, but had moved to New York City by the age of one. He grew up in Miami, Florida, and Washington, D.C. He completed his bachelor in zoology at George Washington University. He received his Ph.D. in geology from Yale University in 1971. Jeremy Jackson is married to Nancy Knowlton. They met in the Caribbean and married in 1983. They have one daughter, Rebecca. Jackson also has a son, Stephen, from a previous marriage. Jackson lives in New York City and Brooksville, Maine, where he guest reads to elementary school students about environmental issues in Maine.

== Career ==
Dr. Jackson started his career as a marine biologist studying the distribution of bryozoans and their behavior. His work on marine bryozoans provided some of the strongest evidence to date for the controversial punctuated equilibrium model of evolutionary change. In addition to the bryozoan work, Jackson produced influential studies on coral reef communities and served as a central figure in a Smithsonian Institution investigation of ecosystems in Panama and the surrounding regions.

Jackson also studied the impact of Hurricane Allen on reefs in Jamaica. The resulting paper confidently predicted recovery of the reef. A few years later, in Jamaica Jackson led a study concerning the impact of an oil spill on the nearshore regions affected. The result: corals affected by the spill died, but so did others, outside the stressed region. The reason for lack of recovery inside impacted regions and deterioration outside such regions, Jackson decided, was human activity.

Concerned about the increasing effect of human impacts on marine ecosystems, Jackson created what is now known as "historical ecology" of marine ecosystems. Using historical and ecological sources, Jackson demonstrated that green sea turtles in the pre-Columbian Caribbean used to exist by the tens of millions, greater than current populations. After that first attempt at understanding what pristine marine ecosystems looked like, Jackson assembled an international team of ecologists, anthropologists, archeologists, and historians, to reconstruct marine ecosystem dynamics from the last several hundred years.

The first result of this interdisciplinary working group was a paper led by Jackson showing that fishing predated any other major disturbance to marine ecosystems in the Holocene. This paper was chosen as the most important contribution of the year 2001 by Discover Magazine. It is, so far, the most cited paper coming out of the National Center for Ecological Analysis and Synthesis (NCEAS) in Santa Barbara, and one of the most cited papers in marine ecology. Jackson also led the definitive assessment for the International Coral Reef Initiative of the declining status and trends of Caribbean coral reef ecosystems over last 50 years.

Jeremy B.C. Jackson is also the founder of the Panama Paleontology Project which uses paleontology and geology to unravel the evolution of Caribbean marine ecosystems over the past 10 million years, in response to the emergence of the Central American Isthmus which isolated the Caribbean from the Pacific and changed global climate. He was also the Ocean Biology Deputy Editor for the journal Science Advances, served on the NOAA Scientific Advisory Board and the World Wildlife Fund USA National Board, and currently serves on Board of the Yale Institute of Biospheric Studies.

== Public lectures and media ==
In addition to his positions as a researcher and educator, as a public lecturer Jackson has spoken in regards to the "brave new ocean", where clear and productive coastal seas turn into oxygen-starved dead zones, and thriving food webs degrade to seas of slime and disease. He has spoken to the United States Senate about ocean issues and held conference at the U.S. Naval War College on the degradation of the ocean environment and its implications for human wellbeing and US national security. He is also a proponent of the shifting baseline concept and spoke at the Shifting Baselines Ocean Media Project's Hollywood Ocean Night in 2004. Jeremy B.C. Jackson was also a featured scientist in the Leonardo DiCaprio film The 11th Hour and Fisher Stevens's Before the Flood.

== Select publications ==
- Publications by Jeremy Jackson
- Jackson JBC (2008) Ecological extinction and evolution in the brave new ocean. Proceedings of the National Academy of Sciences USA 105 (Suppl. 1):11458-11465
- Knowlton N & Jackson JBC (2008) Shifting baselines, local impacts, and climate change on coral reefs. PLOS Biology 6:215-220
- Worm B, Barbier EB, Baumont N, Duffy JE, Foke C, Halpern BS, Jackson JBC, Lotze HK, Micheli F, Palumbi SR, Sala E, Selkoe KA, Stochowicz JJ & Watson R (2006) Impacts of biodiversity loss on ocean ecosystem services. Science 314:787-790
- McClenachan L, Jackson JBC & Newman MJH (2006) Conservation implications of historic sea turtle nesting loss. Frontiers in Ecology and Environment 4:290-296
- Jackson JBC & Erwin DH (2006) What can we learn about ecology and evolution from the fossil record? Trends in Ecology and Evolution 21:322-328
- Newman MJH, Paredes GA, Sala E & Jackson JBC (2006) Structure of Caribbean coral reef communities across a large gradient of fish biomass. Ecology Letters 9:1216-1227
- Lotze HK, Lenihan HS, Bourque BJ, Bradbury RH, Cooke RG, Kay MC, Kidewell SM, Kirby MX, Peterson CH & Jackson JBC (2006) Depletion, degradation, and recovery potential of estuaries and coastal seas. Science 312:1806-1809
- Jackson JBC, Ogden JC, Pandolfi JM, Baron N, Bradbury RH, Guzman HM, Hughes TP, Kappel CV, Micheli F, Possingham HP, Sala E (2005) Reassessing U. S. coral reefs. Science 308:1741-1742
- Eldredge N, Thompson JN, Brakefield PM, Gavrilets S, Jablonski D, Jackson JBC, Lenski RE, Lieberman BS, McPeek, MA, & Miller, W (2005) The dynamics of evolutionary stasis. Paleobiology 31 (Supplement S):133-145
- Pandolfi JM, Jackson JBC., Baron N, Bradbury RH, Guzman H., Hughes TP, Micheli F, Ogden J, Possingham H, Kappel CV, & Sala E (2005) Are US coral reefs on the slippery slope to slime? Science 307:1725-1726.
- Jackson JBC et al. (2001) Historical overfishing and the recent collapse of coastal ecosystems. Science 293:629-638
- Jackson, Jeremy B. C. and Johnson, Kenneth G. 2001. Measuring past biodiversity. Science 293:2401-2403.
- Jackson JBC (1997) Reefs since Columbus. Coral Reefs 16:S23-S32
- Jackson JBC (1977) Competition on marine hard substrata: the adaptive significance of solitary and colonial strategies. American Naturalist 111:743-767
- Jackson JBC & Buss LW (1975) Allelopathy and spatial competition among coral reef invertebrates. Proceedings of the National Academy of Sciences USA 72:5160-5163
