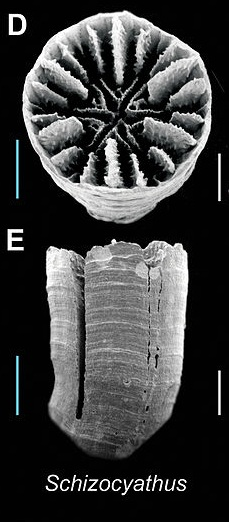
- Schizocyathus fissilis

Scientific classification
- Kingdom: Animalia
- Phylum: Cnidaria
- Subphylum: Anthozoa
- Class: Hexacorallia
- Order: Scleractinia
- Family: Schizocyathidae; Stolarski, 2000

Genera
- See text

= Schizocyathidae =

Family of corals

Schizocyathidae is a family of stony corals. There are currently three genera included in this family and each of them is monotypic. Members of the family are azooxanthellate, deep water species.

== Genera ==
The World Register of Marine Species includes the following genera in the family:

- Genus Pourtalocyathus Cairns, 1979
  - Species Pourtalocyathus hispidus (Pourtalès, 1878)
- Genus Schizocyathus Pourtalès, 1874
  - Species Schizocyathus fissilis Pourtalès, 1874
- Genus Temnotrochus Cairns, 1995
  - Species Temnotrochus kermadecensis Cairns, 1995
