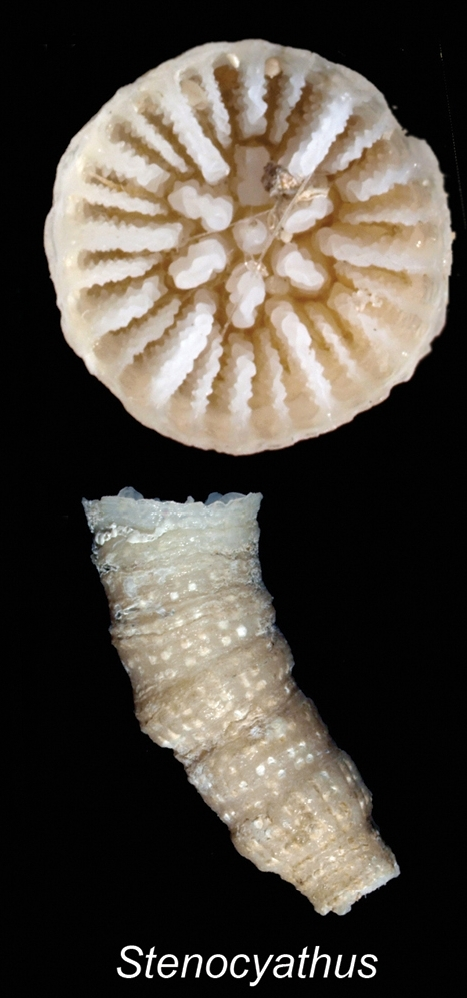
- Stenocyathus vermiformis

Scientific classification
- Kingdom: Animalia
- Phylum: Cnidaria
- Subphylum: Anthozoa
- Class: Hexacorallia
- Order: Scleractinia
- Family: Stenocyathidae

= Stenocyathidae =

Family of corals

Stenocyathidae is a family of corals belonging to the order Scleractinia.

Genera:

- Pedicellocyathus Cairns, 1995
- Stenocyathus Pourtalès, 1871
- Truncatoguynia Cairns, 1989
