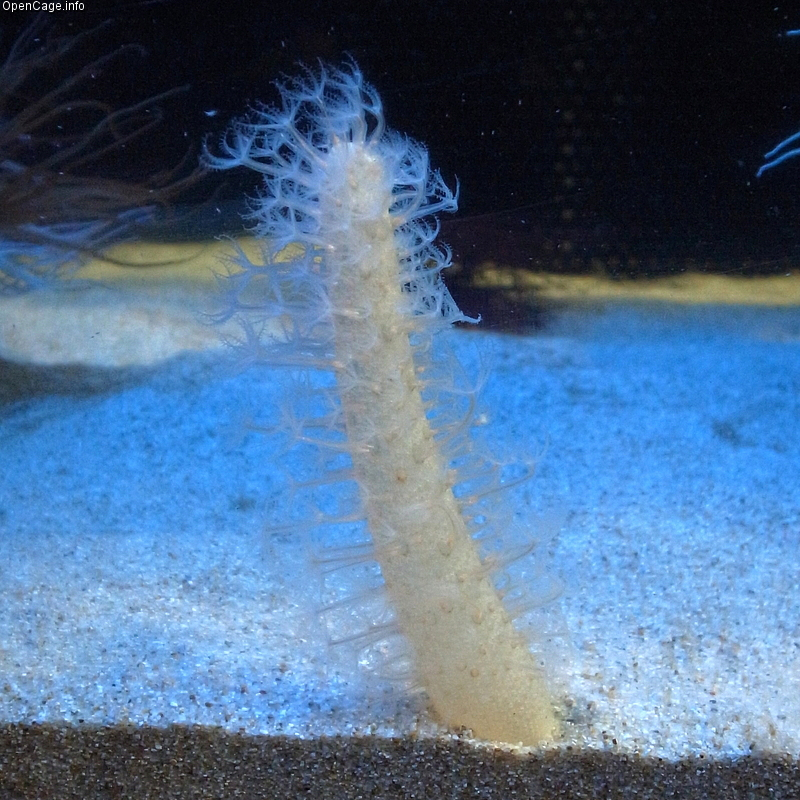
- Cavernularia obesa

Scientific classification
- Kingdom: Animalia
- Phylum: Cnidaria
- Subphylum: Anthozoa
- Class: Octocorallia
- Order: Scleralcyonacea
- Family: Veretillidae
- Genus: Cavernularia (Valenciennes in Milne Edwards & Haime, 1850)

Species
- See text

= Cavernularia (cnidarian) =

Genus of corals

Cavernularia is a genus of marine cnidarians in the family Veretillidae.

The genus contains bioluminescent species.

== Species ==
- Cavernularia capitata Williams, 1989
- Cavernularia chuni Kükenthal & Broch, 1911
- Cavernularia clavata Kükenthal & Broch, 1911
- Cavernularia dayi Tixier-Durivault, 1954
- Cavernularia dedeckeri Williams, 1989
- Cavernularia elegans (Herklots, 1858)
- Cavernularia glans Kölliker, 1872
- Cavernularia habereri Moroff, 1902
- Cavernularia kuekenthali Lopez Gonzalez, Gili & Williams, 2000
- Cavernularia lutkenii Kölliker, 1872
- Cavernularia malabarica Fowler, 1894
- Cavernularia mirifica Tixier-Durivault, 1963
- Cavernularia obesa Valenciennes in Milne Edwards & Haime, 1850
- Cavernularia pusilla (Philippi, 1835)
- Cavernularia vansyoci Williams, 2005
