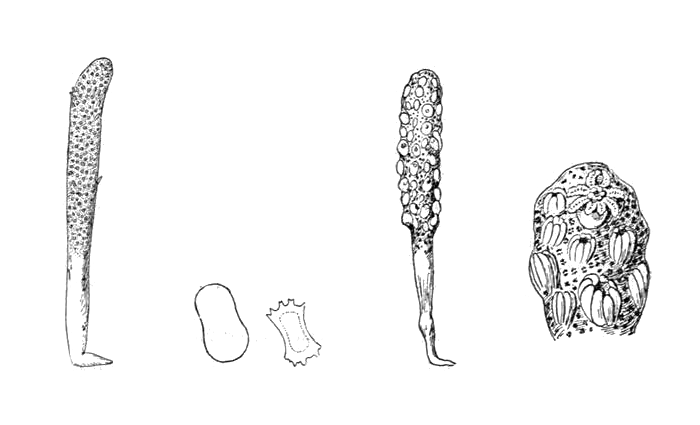
- A drawing of two veretillid sea pens. Habitus and spiculae of Lituaria habereri (left); habitus and apical part of the colony of Lituaria hicksoni (right).

Scientific classification
- Domain: Eukaryota
- Kingdom: Animalia
- Phylum: Cnidaria
- Subphylum: Anthozoa
- Class: Octocorallia
- Order: Pennatulacea
- Family: Veretillidae
- Genus: Lituaria; Valenciennes, 1850

= Lituaria =

Genus of corals

Lituaria is a genus of corals belonging to the family Veretillidae.

The species of this genus are found in Australia, Malesia.

Species:

- Lituaria amoyensis Koo, 1935
- Lituaria australasiae (Gray, 1860)
- Lituaria breve Light, 1921
- Lituaria habereri Balss, 1910
- Lituaria hicksoni Thomson & Simpson, 1909
- Lituaria kuekenthali Light, 1921
- Lituaria molle Light, 1921
- Lituaria phalloides (Pallas, 1766)
- Lituaria philippinensis Light, 1921
- Lituaria valenciennesi d'Hondt, 1984
