= International Coral Reef Society =

Non-profit scientific society

The International Coral Reef Society (ICRS; previously the International Society for Reef Studies) is an international, not-for profit, scientific society dedicated to the conservation of coral reefs through science and understanding. Founded in 1980, the primary objective of ICRS is the improvement of scientific knowledge and understanding of coral reefs, both living and fossil.

== Activities ==
To achieve its objectives the ICRS prints and distributes the journal Coral Reefs as well as a Society newsletter, Reef Encounter. The ICRS also holds annual meetings and co-sponsors other gatherings, symposia and conferences relating to coral reefs.

=== Symposium ===
ICRS helps organize the International Coral Reef Symposium (ICRS). The most recent symposium was held in 2022, in Bremen.

The symposium has previously been held in Honolulu (2016), Cairns, Queensland, Australia (2012); Fort Lauderdale, Florida, United States (2008), Okinawa, Japan (2004), Bali, Indonesia (2000), Panama City, Panama (1996), Guam (1992), Townsville, Queensland, Australia (1988), Tahiti, French Polynesia (1985), Manila, the Philippines (1980), Miami (1977), on board the M.V. Marco Polo in Australian waters (1974), and Mandapam Camp, India (1969, the first symposium). Published proceedings of the ICRS are available at ReefBase.

== Awards ==
The Darwin Medal, the most prestigious award given by the International Coral Reef Society, is presented every four years at the International Coral Reef Symposium. It is awarded to a senior ICRS member who is recognized worldwide for major contributions throughout her or his career. The medal has been awarded ten times; recipients are David Stoddart, Peter Glynn, Ian Macintyre, Yossi Loya, Charlie Veron, Terry Hughes, Jeremy Jackson, Jack Randall, Nancy Knowlton and Ove Hoegh-Guldberg.
