= John W. Wells =

U.S. paleontologist, cnidariologist, and geologist (1907–1994)

John West Wells
- Born: July 15, 1907; Philadelphia, Pennsylvania, U.S.
- Died: January 12, 1994 (aged 86)
- Education: University of Pittsburgh, Cornell University
- Awards: Fulbright Program
- Scientific career
- Fields: Paleontology, biology, geology
- Workplaces: Ohio State University, Cornell University
- Academic advisors: Gilbert D. Harris

John West Wells (July 15, 1907 – January 12, 1994) was an American paleontologist, biologist and geologist who focused his research on corals.

He was notable for, among other things, proving that the rotational period of the Earth undergoes periodic changes. The National Academies of Science said that Wells "made an indelible mark on the world of paleontology." The Independent called Wells "the leading authority on modern and fossil corals, a noteworthy contributor on coral reefs and atolls". Wells was Professor of Geology, Ohio State University, Professor of Geology, Cornell University, President, Paleontological Society, a member of the National Academy of Sciences.

== Early life ==
Wells was bom July 15, 1907, in Philadelphia, Pennsylvania. He went to school in Homer, New York, 20 miles northeast of Ithaca. He took his B.S. degree at the University of Pittsburgh, majoring in chemistry. However he soon became fascinated by geology, under the guidance of Ransom E. Sommers and Henry Leighton.

== Early career ==
Wells became an instructor of geology at the University of Texas from 1929 to 1931, whilst studying for his M.A. from Cornell University in 1930, with a special interest in paleontology. He took his Ph.D. from Cornell in 1933 under Gilbert D. Harris.

During 1933–1934, Wells was a National Research Council Fellow, studying paleontology at the British Museum (Natural History), in London, the French National Museum of Natural History (Paris), and the Natural History Museum of Berlin. Upon his return to the U.S., Wells worked with T. Wayland Vaughan in Washington, D.C. from 1935 to 1937, and "looked for a job." Together they revised a volume on Scleractinia (1943). Wells taught at the State Normal School at Fredonia, New York (now SUNY) from 1937 to 1938, and then was a Professor in Geology at Ohio State University from 1938 to 1948. At Ohio State University, he would begin researching the history of geology. Wells served in the military in France and Germany during 1944–45 in the Office of Strategic Services, and later assisted with studies assessing war damage and in the recovery of coral literature from bombed or burning buildings in Germany. His work with OSS assessed the state of universities and museums in France and Germany, following the war.

== Later career ==
Wells returned to Cornell in 1948 as professor of geology. He served as department chairman from 1962 to 1965. In 1946 he began working with the U.S. Geological Survey. He was involved in research into various Pacific islands, including field work in the resurvey of Bikini Atoll (1947) and was attached to the Pacific Science Board's Arno Atoll Expedition (1950). He would continue to identify, describe, and analyze the Recent and Tertiary corals from these and other expeditions even in his retirement. Many of his publications were the direct result of this Pacific island work.

During 1954, Wells was granted a Fulbright lecturing position at the University of Queensland, spending many months studying corals of the Great Barrier Reef. During this period he established a productive working relationship with Dorothy Hill of the University of Queensland, who was the leading Australian expert on reef geology. Wells and Dorothy Hill would jointly prepare nine sections on the Coelenterata for the Treatise on Invertebrate Paleontology published in 1956. Wells would also prepare sections on Scleractinia for the Treatise.

Wells' most widely read paper appeared in March 1963 and was published in Nature. Astronomers and geophysicists paid attention to his “Coral Growth and Geochronometry” paper, which demonstrated their theory that the Earth's rotation was slowing down. His research indicated that there were more days in the Devonian year (400) compared with those of the modern age (365), by comparing counts of daily growth lines in corals. Wells' paper generated a great amount of research on the incremental growth of skeletal material in several groups of invertebrates. J. B. S. Haldane described Wells' work in an article published in the New York Times, Professor Wells of Cornell University also has this quality. He collects ancient and modern coral. Those which grow in seas where the temperature varies much with the seasons often show annual growth rings like trees. Wells found that some also show daily ridges of growth, which can be counted with a good hand lens costing perhaps $10. Modern corals show about 365 ridges a year….Silurian corals show about 400 rings a year. As the year has probably changed little, therefore the days have been getting longer. (They are getting longer, as we know, from records of ancient eclipses, among other evidence. This is thought to be due to the braking action of the tides, both in the sea and in the earth, which is not quite rigid.) Ask anyone who does not know the answer how much the apparatus cost which proved that the number of days in the year has increased by 35 in 350 million years and he will probably guess at $10 million or so.

Wells would retire from Cornell in 1973, and become Emeritus Professor. In 1975 he travelled to the Charles Darwin Research Station in the Galapagos Islands and helped identify six new species of azooxanthellate corals.

John Wells' long-standing interests and research into local and cultural history, especially that of upstate New York, were able to flourish in retirement. In 1958, he published The Cayuga Bridge, a story of New York local history. The summer home on Cayuga Lake, that Wells and his wife established in 1948, would host students, colleagues, and other friends from around the world, for decades. Wells had an important collection of early works on American and European geology.

== Selected publications ==
- Wells, J.W. (1933). "Corals of the Cretaceous of the Atlantic and Gulf coastal plains and western interior of the United States". Bulletins of American Paleontology. 18 (67): 85–288.
- Wells, J.W. (1934). "Some fossil corals of the West Indies". Proceedings of the U.S. National Museum. 83 (2975): 71–110. doi:10.5479/si.00963801.83-2975.71.
- Wells, J.W. (1936) The nomenclature and type species of some genera of recent and fossil corals. American Journal of Science, ser. 5, 31(182): 97-134.
- Wells, J.W. (1937). "Individual variation in the rugose coral species Heliophyllum halli E. & H.". Palaeontographica Americana. 2 (6): 1–22.
- Wells, J.W. (1941). "Crinoids and Callixylon". American Journal of Science. 239 (6): 454–456. Bibcode:1941AmJS..239..454W. doi:10.2475/ajs.239.6.454.
- Wells, J.W. with Vaughan, T. W. (1943). Revision of the suborders, families, and genera of the Scleractinia. Geological Society of America Special Paper 44.
- Wells, J.W. (1945) West Indian Eocene and Miocene corals. Geological Society of America Memoir 9, part 2.
- Wells, J.W. (1947). "Provisional paleoecological analysis of Devonian rocks of the Columbus region". Ohio Journal of Science. 47: 119–126.
- Ladd, H.S.; Emery, K.O.; Tracy, J.I. Jr.; Wells, J.W. (1950). "Organic growth and sedimentation on an atoll". Journal of Geology. 58 (4): 410–425. Bibcode:1950JG.....58..410L. doi:10.1086/625753. S2CID 129615820.
- Wells, J. W. (1951). "The coral reefs of Arno Atoll, Marshall Islands". Atoll Research Bulletin. 9: 1–14. doi:10.5479/si.00775630.9.1.
- Wells, J.W. (1954). "Recent corals of the Marshall Islands". U.S. Geological Survey Professional Paper. 260–1: 385–486.
- Wells, J. W. (1955) Recent and subfossil corals of Moreton Bay, Queensland. Papers (University of Queensland. Dept. of Geology), 4(10).: 1-24.
- Stephenson, W. and Wells, J.W. (1956) The corals of Low Isles, Queensland. Papers (University of Queensland. Dept. of Zoology), 1(4): 1-65.
- Hill, D., and Wells, J.W. (1956) Cnidaria—general features. Section F5, Coelenterata. In: Moore, R.C., ed., Treatise on invertebrate paleontology. Geological Society of America and University of Kansas Press, Lawrence, Kansas
- Wells, J.W. (1956) Scleractinia, in Moore, R. C., ed., Treatise on invertebrate paleontology, Part F, Coelentarata. New York, Geological Society of America and Lawrence, Kansas, University of Kansas Press, p. F328-444.
- Wells, J.W. (1957) Coral reefs. Treatise on marine ecology and paleoecology. Ecology (1): 609-631 . Geological Society of America, Memoir 67.
- Wells, J.W. (1958) The Cayuga Bridge: Ithaca, New York, DeWitt Historical Society, 14 p. (second edition, 1961, 18 p.; third edition, 1966, 18 p.).
- Wells, J.W. (1963a). "Coral growth and geochronometry". Nature. 197 (4871): 948–950. Bibcode:1963Natur.197..948W. doi:10.1038/197948a0. S2CID 36696148.
- Wells, J.W. (1963b) Early investigations of the Devonian System in New York, 1656–1836. Geological Society of America Special Paper 74.
- Todd, R., Wells, J.W., Brown, D.A.; Cooper, G.A.; Kier, P.M.; Roberts, H.B. (1964) "Bikini and nearby atolls, Marshall Islands". U. S. Geological Survey Professional Paper, 1067–1131.
- Wells, J.W. (1964) Ahermatypic corals from Queensland. Papers (University of Queensland. Dept. of Zoology), 2(6): 107–121.
- Wells, J.W. (1966). "Evolutionary development in the scleractinian family Fungiidae". Zoological Society of London Symposium. 16: 223–246.
- Wells, J.W. (1967). "Corals as bathometers". Marine Geology. 5 (5–6): 349–365. Bibcode:1967MGeol...5..349W. doi:10.1016/0025-3227(67)90045-x.
- Wells, J.W. (1967). "The Devonian coral Pachyphyllum vagabundum, a necroplotic P. woodtnanil". Journal of Paleontology. 41: 1280.
- Wells, J.W. (1969) The formation of dissepiments in zoanthrarian corals. In K.S.W. Campbell (ed). Stratigraphy and palaeontology: essays in honour of Dorothy Hill. Canberra: Australian National University Press, p. 17-26.
- Wells, J.W. (1973). "New and old scleractinian corals from Jamaica". Bulletin of Marine Science. 23: 16–55.
- Wells, J.W. (1982). "Notes on Indo-Pacific scleractinian corals, part 9. New corals from the Galapagos Islands". Pacific Science. 36: 211–219.
- Wells, J.W. (1983) Annotated list of the scleractinian corals of the Galápagos, in Glynn, P. W., and Wellington, G. M., Corals and coral reefs of the Galápagos Islands: Berkeley, University of California Press, p 212–296.
- Wells, J.W. (1986) A list of scleractinian generic and subgeneric taxa, 1758–1985. Fossil Cnidaria, 15 (1.1). (Additions and corrections: 1987, v. 16, no. 1, p. 49-53).

== Chronology ==
- 15 July 1907: born Philadelphia, Pennsylvania
- 1928: graduate from the University of Pittsburgh
- 1932: married Elizabeth "Pie" Baker
- 1933: Ph.D. from Cornell University
- 1938-48: Professor of Geology, Ohio State University
- 1948-73: Professor of Geology, Cornell University
- 1954: Fulbright Scholar, University of Queensland
- 1961-62: President, Paleontological Society
- 1968: elected to the National Academy of Sciences
- 12 January 1994: died Ithaca, New York

== Awards and memberships ==
Wells was a Fellow of the Geological Society of America. He was President of the Paleontological Research Institution (1961–63). He was President of the Paleontology Society (1961–62). He was a member of the Society of Vertebrate Paleontology, Society of Systematic Zoology, Society for the Study of Evolution, American Association for the Advancement of Science, Sigma Xi, and the International Association for the Study of Fossil Cnidaria. He was made a member of the National Academy of Sciences in 1968. He was awarded the Paleontology Society Medal in 1974, and the James Hall Medal of the New York Geological Survey in 1987.

== Legacy ==
Wells married Elizabeth (“Pie”) Baker, of Ithaca, in late 1932, after meeting her at Cornell University. Their daughter, Ellen Baker Wells was born in Germany. At his death in 1994, Wells was survived by his daughter, two granddaughters, and two great grandchildren. Ellen Wells would go on to become head librarian in the Dibner Rare Books Library of the Smithsonian Institution in Washington D.C.

The Wells family donated papers to the Cornell University Library Archives, Division of Rare and Manuscript Collections -Baker Wells Family Papers, #3601.

The Paleontological Research Institution established a grant in Wells' name for students to use their research collection.
