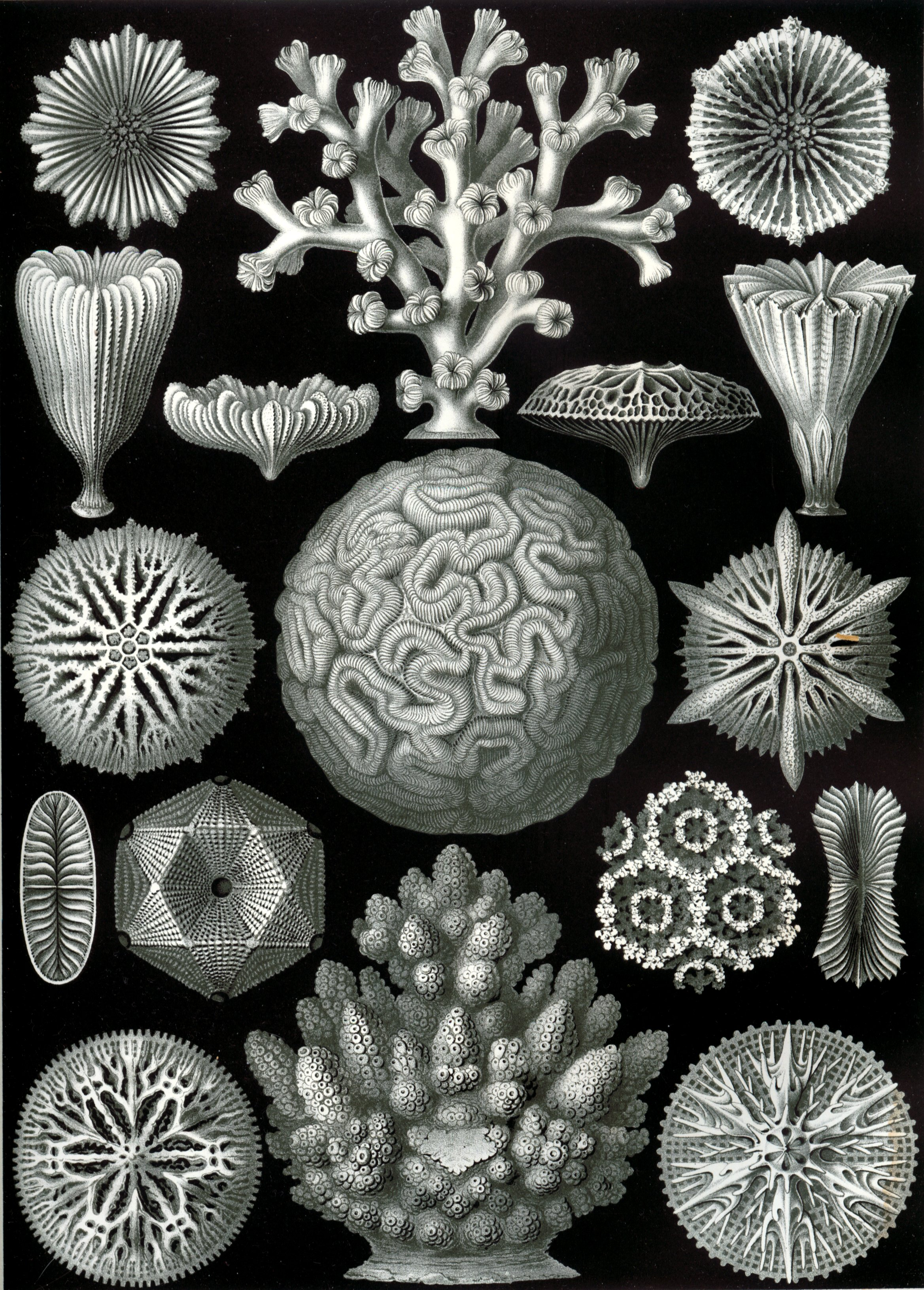
- Scleractinian corals, illustration by Ernst Haeckel, 1904
- CITES Appendix II

Scientific classification
- Kingdom: Animalia
- Phylum: Cnidaria
- Subphylum: Anthozoa
- Class: Hexacorallia
- Order: Scleractinia; Bourne, 1900

Families
- About 35, see text.

Synonyms
- Madreporaria

= Scleractinia =

Stony corals Temporal range: Middle Triassic - Recent

Order of Hexacorallia which produce a massive stony skeleton

Scleractinia, also called stony corals or hard corals, are marine animals in the phylum Cnidaria that build themselves a hard skeleton. The individual animals are known as polyps and have a cylindrical body crowned by an oral disc in which a mouth is fringed with tentacles. Although some species are solitary, most are colonial. The founding polyp settles and starts to secrete calcium carbonate to protect its soft body. Solitary corals can be as much as 25 cm (10 in) across but in colonial species the polyps are usually only a few millimetres in diameter. These polyps reproduce asexually by budding, but remain attached to each other, forming a multi-polyp colony of clones with a common skeleton, which may be up to several metres in diameter or height according to species.

The shape and appearance of each coral colony depends not only on the species, but also on its location, depth, the amount of water movement and other factors. Many shallow-water corals contain symbiont unicellular organisms known as zooxanthellae within their tissues. These give their colour to the coral which thus may vary in hue depending on what species of symbiont it contains. Stony corals are closely related to sea anemones, and like them are armed with stinging cells known as cnidocytes. Corals reproduce both sexually and asexually. Most species release gametes into the sea where fertilisation takes place, and the planula larvae drift as part of the plankton, but a few species brood their eggs. Asexual reproduction is mostly by fragmentation, when part of a colony becomes detached and reattaches elsewhere.

Stony corals occur in all the world's oceans. Much of the framework of modern coral reefs is formed by scleractinians. Reef-building or hermatypic corals are mostly colonial; most of these are zooxanthellate and are found in the shallow waters into which sunlight penetrates. Other corals that do not form reefs may be solitary or colonial; some of these occur at abyssal depths where no light reaches.

Stony corals first appeared in the Middle Triassic, but their relationship to the tabulate and rugose corals of the Paleozoic is currently unresolved. In modern times stony corals numbers are expected to decline due to the effects of global warming and ocean acidification.

== Anatomy ==
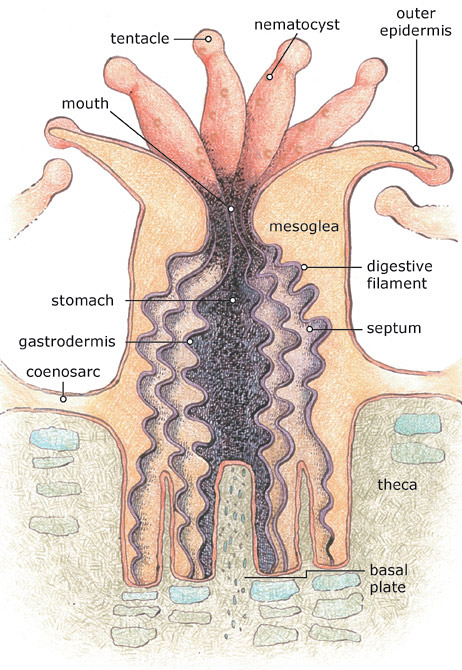
Diagram showing a coral polyp, its corallite, coenosarc and coenosteum

Scleractinian corals may be solitary or colonial. Colonies can reach considerable size, consisting of a large number of individual polyps.

=== Soft parts ===
Stony corals are members of the class Anthozoa and like other members of the group, do not have a medusa stage in their life cycle. The individual animals are known as polyps and have a cylindrical body crowned by an oral disc surrounded by a ring of tentacles. The base of the polyp secretes the stony material from which the coral skeleton is formed. The body wall of the polyp consists of mesoglea sandwiched between two layers of epidermis. The mouth is at the centre of the oral disc and leads into a tubular pharynx which descends for some distance into the body before opening into the gastrovascular cavity that fills the interior of the body and tentacles. Unlike other cnidarians however, the cavity is subdivided by a number of radiating partitions, thin sheets of living tissue, known as mesenteries. The gonads are also located within the cavity walls. The polyp is retractable into the corallite, the stony cup in which it sits, being pulled back by sheet-like retractor muscles.

The polyps are connected by horizontal sheets of tissue known as coenosarc extending over the outer surface of the skeleton and completely covering it. These sheets are continuous with the body wall of the polyps, and include extensions of the gastrovascular cavity, so that food and water can circulate between all the different members of the colony. In colonial species, the repeated asexual division of the polyps causes the corallites to be interconnected, thus forming the colonies. Also, cases exist in which the adjacent colonies of the same species form a single colony by fusing. Most colonial species have very small polyps, ranging from 1 to 3 mm (0.04 to 0.12 in) in diameter, although some solitary species may be as large as 25 cm (10 in).

=== Skeleton ===
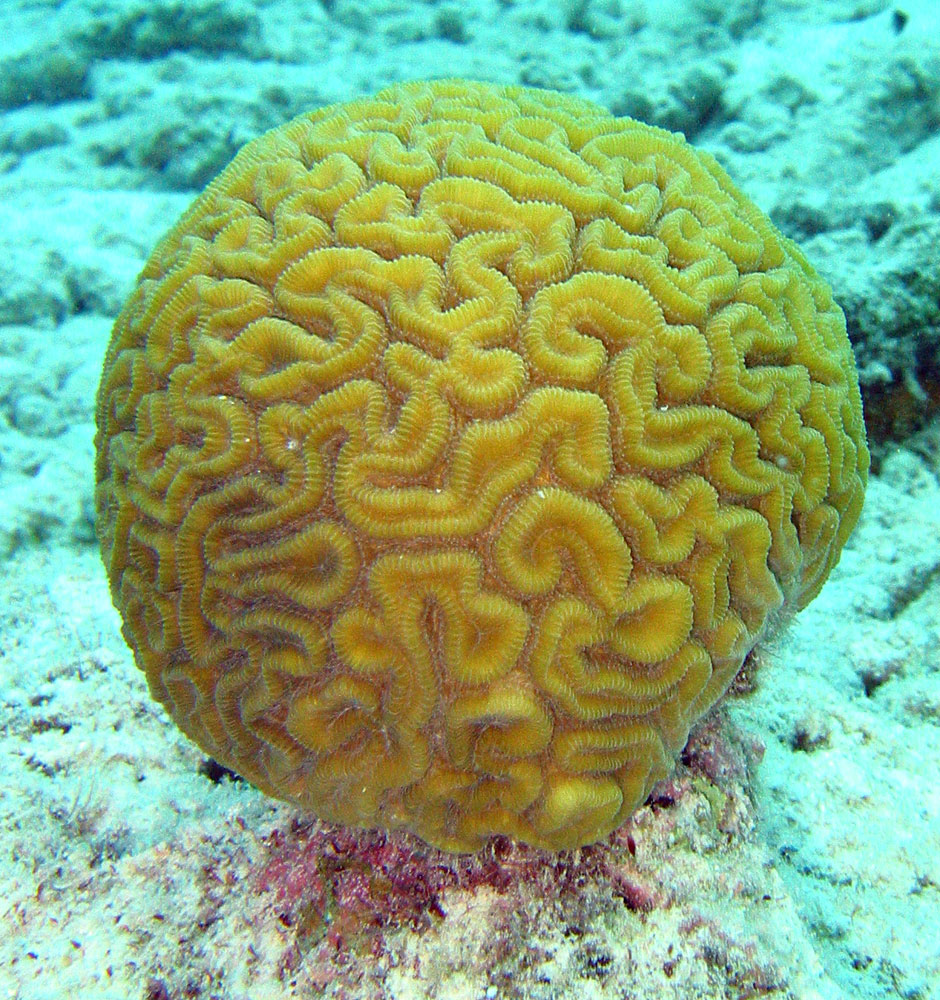
Diploria labyrinthiformis, a brain coral

The skeleton of an individual scleractinian polyp is known as a corallite. It is secreted by the epidermis of the lower part of the body, and initially forms a cup surrounding this part of the polyp. The interior of the cup contains radially aligned plates, or septa, projecting upwards from the base. Each of these plates is flanked by a pair of mesenteries.

The septa are secreted by the mesenteries, and are therefore added in the same order as the mesenteries are. As a result, septa of different ages are adjacent to one another, and the symmetry of the scleractinian skeleton is radial or biradial. This pattern of septal insertion is termed "cyclic" by paleontologists. By contrast, in some fossil corals, adjacent septa lie in order of increasing age, a pattern termed serial and produces a bilateral symmetry. Scleractinians secrete a stony exoskeleton in which the septa are inserted between the mesenteries in multiples of six.

All modern scleractinian skeletons are composed of calcium carbonate in the form of crystals of aragonite, however, a prehistoric scleractinian (Coelosimilia) had a non-aragonite skeletal structure which was composed of calcite. The structure of both simple and compound scleractinians is light and porous, rather than solid as is the case in the prehistoric order Rugosa. Scleractinians are also distinguished from rugosans by their pattern of septal insertion.

=== Growth ===
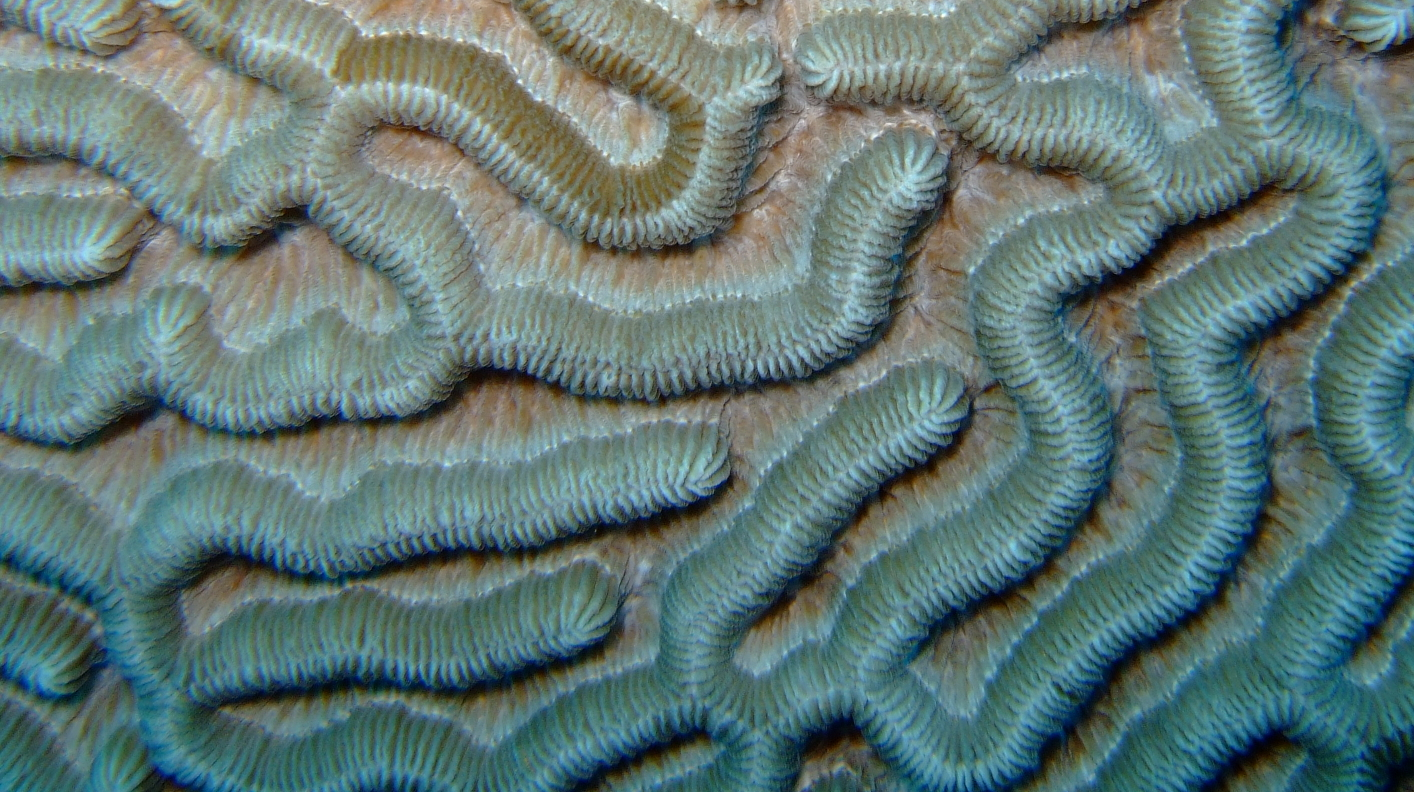
Meandering corallite walls of an intratentacular budding coral

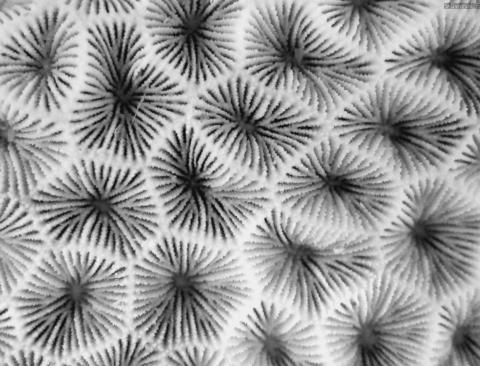
Separate corallites of an extratentacular budding species

In colonial corals, growth results from the budding of new polyps. There are two types of budding, intratentacular and extratentacular. In intratentacular budding, a new polyp develops on the oral disc, inside the ring of tentacles. This can form individual, separate polyps or a row of partially separated polyps sharing an elongate oral disc with a series of mouths. Tentacles grow around the margin of this elongated oral disc and not around the individual mouths. This is surrounded by a single corallite wall, as is the case in the meandroid corallites of brain corals.

Extratentacular budding always results in separate polyps, each with its own corallite wall. In the case of bushy corals such as Acropora, lateral budding from axial polyps form the basis of the trunk and branches. The rate at which a stony coral colony lays down calcium carbonate depends on the species, but some of the branching species can increase in height or length by around 10 cm (4 in) a year (about the same rate as human hair grows). Other corals, like the dome and plate species, are more bulky and may only grow 0.3 to 2 cm (0.1 to 0.8 in) per year. The rate of aragonite deposition varies diurnally and seasonally. Examination of cross sections of coral can show bands of deposition indicating annual growth. Like tree rings, these can be used to estimate the age of the coral.

Solitary corals do not bud. They gradually increase in size as they deposit more calcium carbonate and produce new whorls of septa. A large Ctenactis echinata for example normally has a single mouth, may be about 25 cm (10 in) long and have more than a thousand septa.

== Distribution ==
Stony corals occur in all the world's oceans. There are two main ecological groups. Hermatypic corals are mostly colonial corals which tend to live in clear, oligotrophic, shallow tropical waters; they are the world's primary reef-builders. Ahermatypic corals are either colonial or solitary and are found in all regions of the ocean and do not build reefs. Some live in tropical waters but some inhabit temperate seas, polar waters, or live at great depths, from the photic zone down to about 6,000 m (20,000 ft).

== Ecology ==
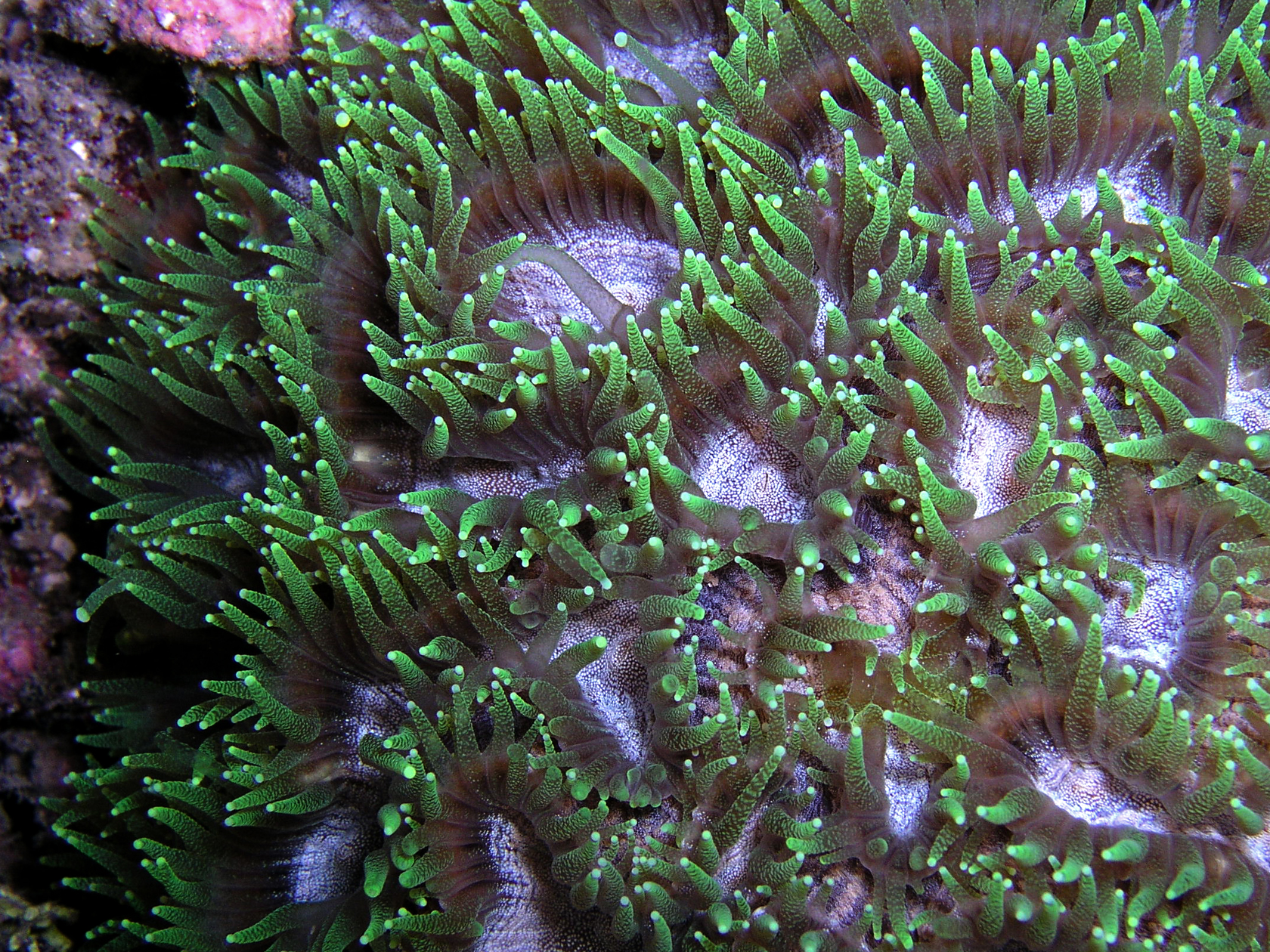
Hard coral Favites extends its polyps at night to feed.

Scleractinians fall into one of two main categories:

- Reef-forming or hermatypic corals, which mostly contain zooxanthellae;
- Non-reef-forming or ahermatypic corals, which mostly do not contain zooxanthellae

In reef-forming corals, the endodermal cells are usually replete with symbiotic unicellular dinoflagellates known as zooxanthellae. There are sometimes as many as five million cells of these per 1 square centimetre (0.16 sq in) of coral tissue. Up to 50% of organic compounds produced by symbionts are used as food by polyps. The oxygen byproduct of photosynthesis and the additional energy derived from sugars produced by zooxanthellae enable these corals to grow at a rate up to three times faster than similar species without symbionts. These corals typically grow in shallow, well-lit, warm water with moderate to brisk turbulence and abundant oxygen, and prefer firm, non-muddy surfaces on which to settle.

Most stony corals extend their tentacles to feed on zooplankton, but those with larger polyps take correspondingly larger prey, including various invertebrates and even small fish. In addition to capturing prey in this way, many stony corals also produce mucus films they can move over their bodies using cilia; these trap small organic particles which are then pulled towards and into the mouth. In a few stony corals, this is the primary method of feeding, and the tentacles are reduced or absent, an example being Acropora acuminata. Caribbean stony corals are generally nocturnal, with the polyps retracting into their skeletons during the day, thus maximising the exposure of the zooxanthellae to the light, but in the Indo-Pacific region, many species feed by day and night.

Non-zooxanthellate corals are usually not reef-formers; they can be found most abundantly beneath about 500 m (1,600 ft) of water. They thrive at much colder temperatures and can live in total darkness, deriving their energy from the capture of plankton and suspended organic particles. The growth rates of most species of non-zooxanthellate corals are significantly slower than those of their counterparts, and the typical structure for these corals is less calcified and more susceptible to mechanical damage than that of zooxanthellate corals.

Scleratinians were previously believed to be obligatory hosts of another group of barnacles, the pyrgomatids, but a recent study recorded evidence of living pyrgomatids in stylasterids, casting doubt on this idea.

== Life cycle ==
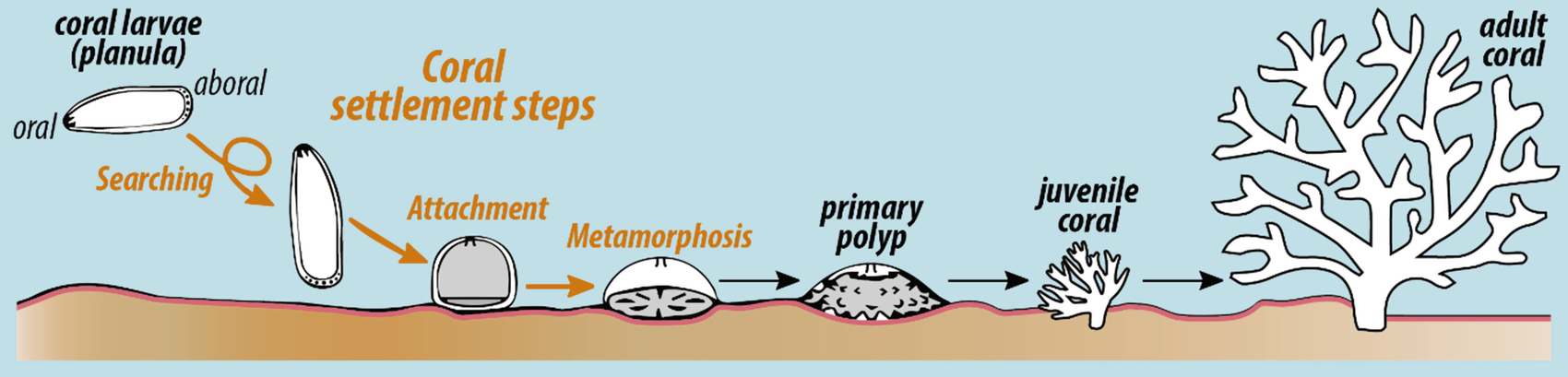
Settlement and early life stages of scleractinian corals. This figure focuses on the first steps of a coral larvae (searching, attachment, and metamorphosis) toward an adult coral.

Stony corals have a great range of reproductive strategies and can reproduce both sexually and asexually. Many species have separate sexes, the whole colony being either male or female, but others are hermaphroditic, with individual polyps having both male and female gonads. Some species brood their eggs but in most species, sexual reproduction results in the production of a free-swimming planula larva that eventually settles on the seabed to undergo metamorphosis into a polyp. In colonial species, this initial polyp then repeatedly divides asexually, to give rise to the entire colony.

=== Asexual reproduction ===
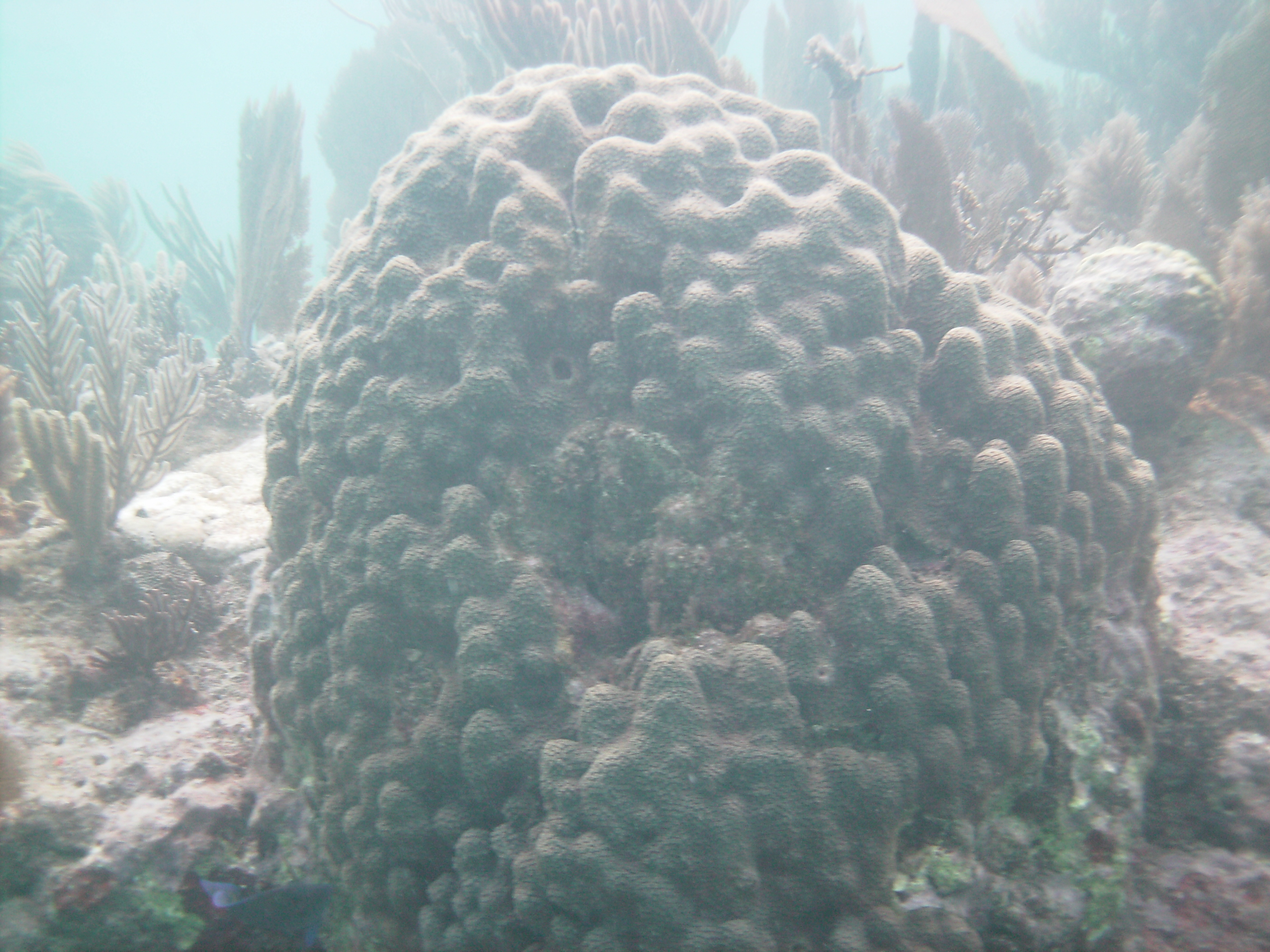
Montastraea annularis can be fragmented to form new colonies.

The most common means of asexual reproduction in colonial stony corals is by fragmentation. Pieces of branching corals may get detached during storms, by strong water movement or by mechanical means, and fragments fall to the sea bed. In suitable conditions, these are capable of adhering to the substrate and starting new colonies. Even such massive corals as Montastraea annularis have been shown to be capable of forming new colonies after fragmentation. This process is used in the reef aquarium hobby to increase stock without the necessity to harvest corals from the wild.

Under adverse conditions, certain species of coral resort to another type of asexual reproduction in the form of "polyp bail-out", which may allow polyps to survive even though the parent colony dies. It involves the growth of the coenosarc to seal off the polyps, detachment of the polyps and their settlement on the seabed to initiate new colonies. In other species, small balls of tissue detach themselves from the coenosarc, differentiate into polyps and start secreting calcium carbonate to form new colonies, and in Pocillopora damicornis, unfertilised eggs can develop into viable larvae.

=== Sexual reproduction ===
The overwhelming majority of scleractinian taxa are hermaphroditic in their adult colonies. In temperate regions, the usual pattern is synchronized release of eggs and sperm into the water during brief spawning events, often related to the phases of the moon. In tropical regions, reproduction may occur throughout the year. In many cases, as in the genus Acropora, the eggs and sperm are released in buoyant bundles which rise to the surface. This increases the concentration of sperm and eggs and thus the likelihood of fertilization, and reduces the risk of self-fertilization. Immediately after spawning, the eggs are delayed in their capability for fertilization until after the release of polar bodies. This delay, and possibly some degree of self-incompatibility, likely increases the chance of cross-fertilization. A study of four species of Scleractinia found that cross-fertilization was actually the dominant mating pattern, although three of the species were also capable of self-fertilization to varying extents.

== Evolutionary history ==
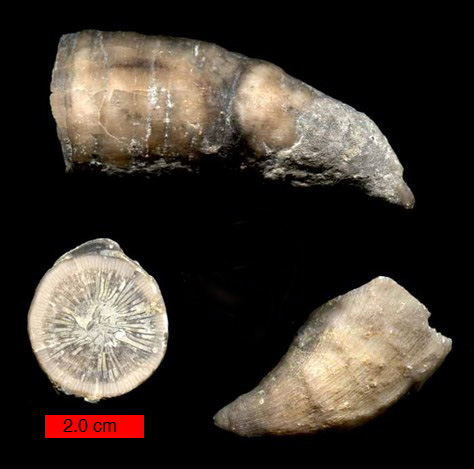
Palaeozoic rugose corals with calcite skeletons, like this Grewingkia canadensis, are doubtfully ancestors of the Scleractinia.

There is little evidence on which to base a hypothesis about the origin of the scleractinians; plenty is known about modern species but very little about fossil specimens, which first appeared in the record in the Middle Triassic (240 million years ago). It was not until 25 million years later that they became important reef builders, their success likely a result of teaming up with symbiotic algae. Nine of the sub-orders were in existence by the end of the Triassic and three more had appeared by the Jurassic (200 million years ago), with a further suborder appearing in the Middle Cretaceous (100 million years ago). Some may have developed from a common ancestor, either an anemone-like coral without a skeleton, or a rugose coral. A rugose coral seems an unlikely common ancestor because these corals had calcite rather than aragonite skeletons, and the septa were arranged serially rather than cyclically. However, it may be that similarities of scleractinians to rugosans are due to a common non-skeletalized ancestor in the early Paleozoic. Alternatively, scleractinians may have developed from a Corallimorpharia-like ancestor. It seems that skeletogenesis may have been associated with the development of symbiosis and reef formation, and may have occurred on more than one occasion. DNA sequencing appears to indicate that scleractinian corals are a monophyletic group.

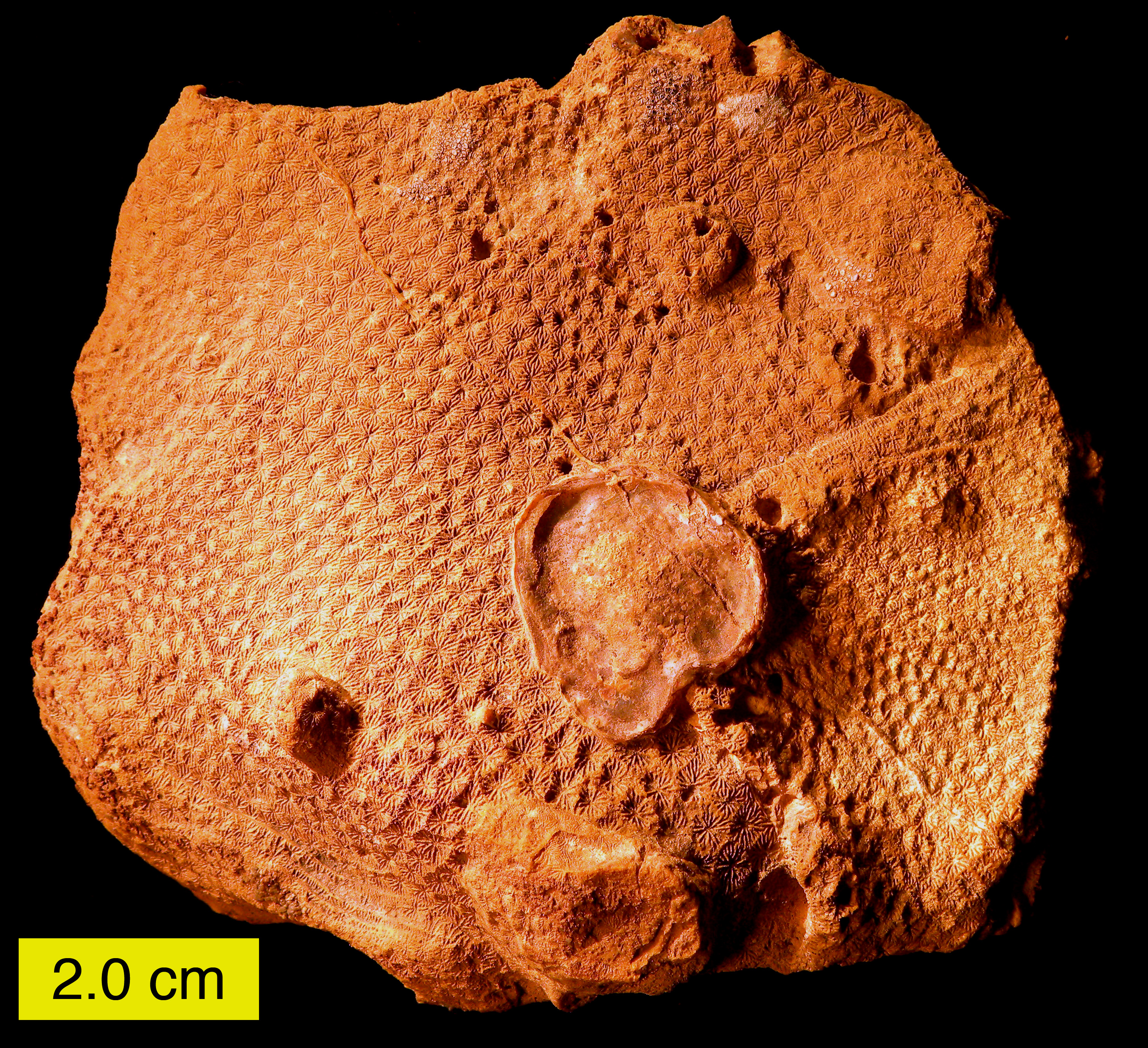
Scleractinian coral from the Matmor Formation (Jurassic) of Makhtesh Gadol

The earliest scleractinians were not reef builders, but were small, phaceloid or solitary individuals. Scleractinian corals were probably at their greatest diversity in the Jurassic and all but disappeared in the mass extinction event at the end of the Cretaceous, about 18 out of 67 genera surviving. Recently discovered Paleozoic corals with aragonitic skeletons and cyclic septal insertion – two features that characterize Scleractinia – have strengthened the hypothesis for an independent origin of the Scleractinia. Whether the early scleractinian corals were zooxanthellate is an open question. The phenomenon seems to have evolved independently on numerous occasions during the Tertiary, and the genera Astrangia, Madracis, Cladocora and Oculina, all in different families, each have both zooxanthellate and non-zooxanthellate members.

The fact that zooxanthellate coral make up only about half of the order is unusual, as symbiosis is almost always an all-or-nothing phenomenon. This symbiotic equilibrium suggests that there must be evolutionary processes simultaneously maintaining and limiting symbiotic relationships. This is likely because despite the energetic benefits it provides, photosymbiosis appears to be an evolutionary disadvantage during mass extinctions. Traits that generally enable corals to survive mass extinction include deep-water or large habitat range, non-symbiotic, solitary or small colonies, and bleaching resistance, all of which tend to characterize azooxanthellate (non-symbiotic) corals. Endosymbionts, on the other hand, which rely on specialized conditions and access to light to survive, are especially vulnerable to prolonged darkness, temperature change, and eutrophication, all of which have been hallmarks of past mass extinctions. This makes zooxanthellate coral especially vulnerable to unstable conditions. Therefore, it is possible that coral and zooxanthellate coevolved loosely, with the relationship dissolving when advantages decreased, then reforming when conditions stabilized.

== Classification ==
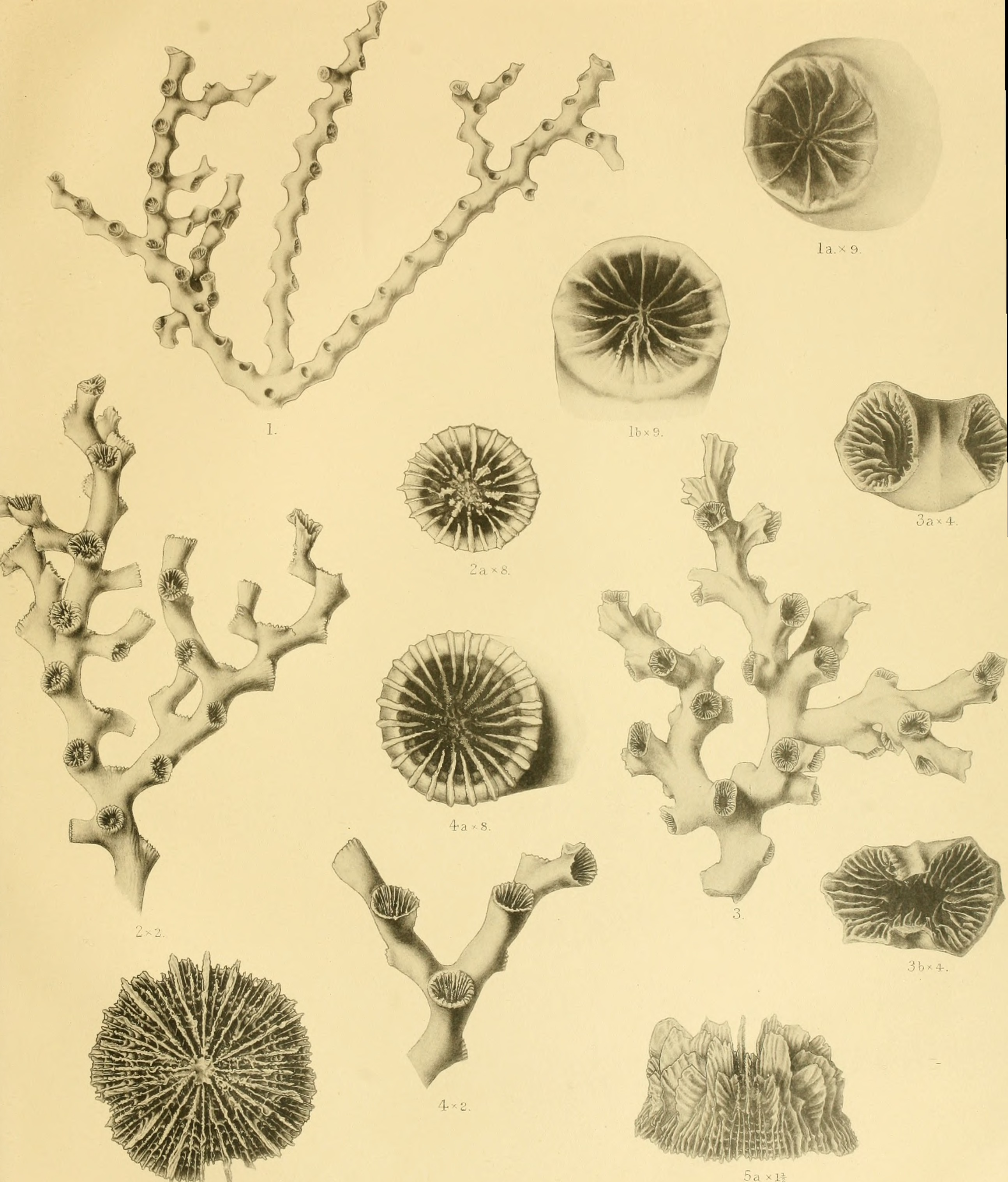
A deep-sea Madreporaria collected by the Royal Indian Marine Survey ship Investigator, 1898

The taxonomy of Scleractinia is particularly challenging. Many species were described before the advent of scuba diving, with little realisation by the authors that coral species could have varying morphologies in different habitats. Collectors were mostly limited to observing corals on reef flats, and were unable to observe the changes in morphology that occurred in more turbid, deeper-water conditions. More than 2,000 nominal species were described in this era, and by the rules of nomenclature, the name given to the first described species has precedence over the rest, even when that description is poor, and the environment and even sometimes the country of the type specimen is unknown.

Even the concept of "the species" is suspect, with regard to corals which have large geographical ranges with a number of sub-populations; their geographic boundaries merge with those of other species; their morphological boundaries merge with those of other species; and there are no definite distinctions between species and subspecies.

The evolutionary relationships among stony corals were first examined in the 19th and early 20th centuries. The two most advanced 19th century classifications both used complex skeletal characters; The 1857 classification of the French zoologists Henri Milne-Edwards and Jules Haime's was based on macroscopic skeletal characters, while Francis Grant Ogilvie's 1897 scheme was developed using observations of skeletal microstructures, with particular attention to the structure and pattern of the septal trabeculae. In 1943, the American zoologists Thomas Wayland Vaughan and John West Wells, and Wells again in 1956, used the patterns of the septal trabeculae to divide the group into five suborders. In addition, they considered polypoid features such as the growth of the tentacles. They also distinguished families by wall type and type of budding.

The 1952 classification by French zoologist J. Alloiteau was built on these earlier systems but included more microstructural observations and did not involve the anatomical characters of the polyp. Alloiteau recognized eight suborders. In 1942, W.H. Bryan and D. Hill stressed the importance of microstructural observations by proposing that stony corals begin skeletal growth by configuring calcification centers, which are genetically derived. Therefore, diverse patterns of calcification centers are vital to classification. Alloiteau later showed that established morphological classifications were unbalanced and that there were many examples of convergent evolution between fossils and recent taxa.

The rise of molecular techniques at the end of the 20th century prompted new evolutionary hypotheses that were different from ones founded on skeletal data. Results of molecular studies explained a variety of aspects of the evolutionary biology of the Scleractinia, including connections between and within extant taxa, and supplied support for hypotheses about extant corals that are founded on the fossil record. The 1996 analysis of mitochondrial RNA undertaken by American zoologists Sandra Romano and Stephen Palumbi found that molecular data supported the assembling of species into the existing families, but not into the traditional suborders. For example, some genera affiliated with different suborders were now located on the same branch of a phylogenetic tree. In addition, there is no distinguishing morphological character that separates clades, only molecular differences.

The Australian zoologist John Veron and his co-workers analyzed ribosomal RNA in 1996 to obtain similar results to Romano and Palumbi, again concluding that the traditional families were plausible but that the suborders were incorrect. They also established that stony corals are monophyletic, including all the descendants of a common ancestor, but that they are divided into two groups, the robust and complex clades. Veron suggested that both morphological and molecular systems be used in future classification schemes.

=== Families ===
The World Register of Marine Species lists the following families as being included in the order Scleractinia. Some species have not been placeable (Incertae sedis):

- Acroporidae
- Agariciidae
- †Agathiphylliidae
- Anthemiphylliidae
- Astrocoeniidae
- Caryophylliidae
- Coscinaraeidae
- Deltocyathidae
- Dendrophylliidae
- Diploastreidae
- Euphylliidae
- Flabellidae
- Fungiacyathidae
- Fungiidae
- Gardineriidae
- Guyniidae
- Lobophylliidae
- Meandrinidae
- Merulinidae
- Micrabaciidae
- Montastraeidae
- Mussidae
- Oculinidae
- †Oulastreidae
- Plesiastreidae
- Pocilloporidae
- Poritidae
- Psammocoridae
- Rhizangiidae
- Schizocyathidae
- Siderastreidae
- Stenocyathidae
- †Stylinidae
- Turbinoliidae
- Mussidae accepted as Faviidae

== Conservation ==
All Scleractinian corals (excluding fossils) are listed under Appendix II of the Convention on International Trade in Endangered Species (CITES) meaning that their international trade (including in parts and derivatives) is regulated.

== See also ==
- Environmental issues with coral reefs
- Corals of the World, a website by J. E. N. Veron specialized in Scleractinia.
