= Jules Haime =

French geologist, paleontologist and zoologist

- Born: 28 March 1824
- Died: 28 September 1856 (aged 32); Paris, France

Jules Haime (28 March 1824, Tours – 28 September 1856, Paris) was a French geologist, paleontologist and zoologist known for his research of coral.

After studying medicine in Tours, he focused his energies towards natural history. Subsequently, he relocated to Paris, where he came under the influence of zoologist Henri Milne-Edwards. In 1855 he became a professor of natural history at the Lycée Napoléon in Paris. In January 1856 (several months prior to his death at age 32) he was named vice-president of the Société géologique de France.

== Written works ==
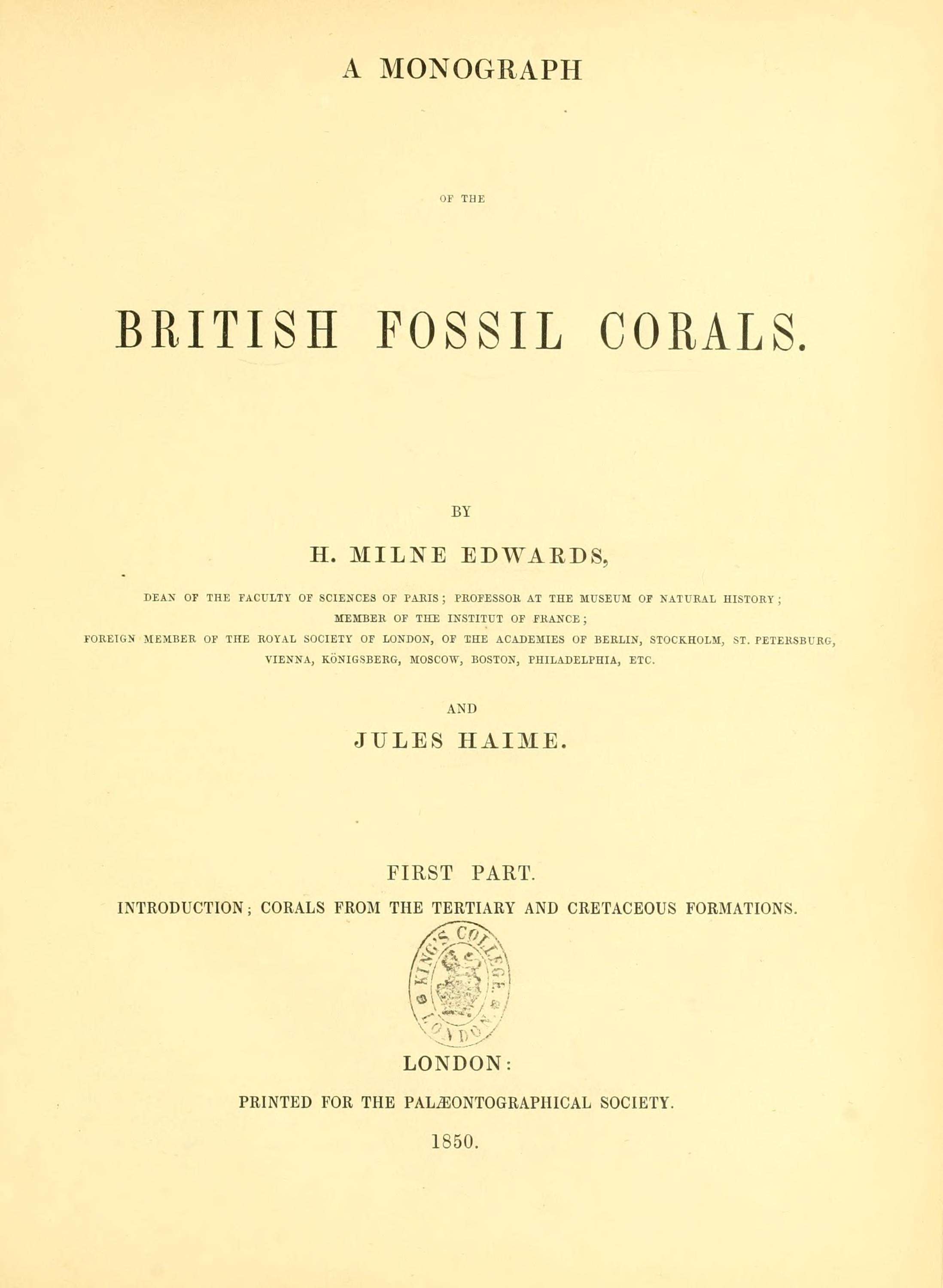
A monograph of the British fossil corals by Henri Milne-Edwards and Jules Haime (Part I), published in 1850

He collaborated with Milne-Edwards on the following studies of coral:

- Recherches sur la structure, et la classification des polypiers : recents et fossiles, 1848-1849 - Research on the structure and classification of coral.
- A monograph of the British fossil corals, (published in English), 1850-1854.
- Histoire naturelle des coralliaires, ou polypes proprement dits, 1857-1860 - Natural history of coral, etc.

Other noteworthy efforts associated with Haime include:

- Description des animaux fossiles du groupe nummulitique de l'Inde, précédée d'un résumé géologique et d'une monographie des nummulites, 1853 (with Adolphe d'Archiac) - Description of fossil animals (nummulites) found in India.
- Description des bryozoaires fossiles de la formation jurassique, 1854 - Description of fossil bryozoans of the Jurassic era.
- Notice sur la géologie de l'ile Majorque, 1855 - Notes on the geology of Majorca.
