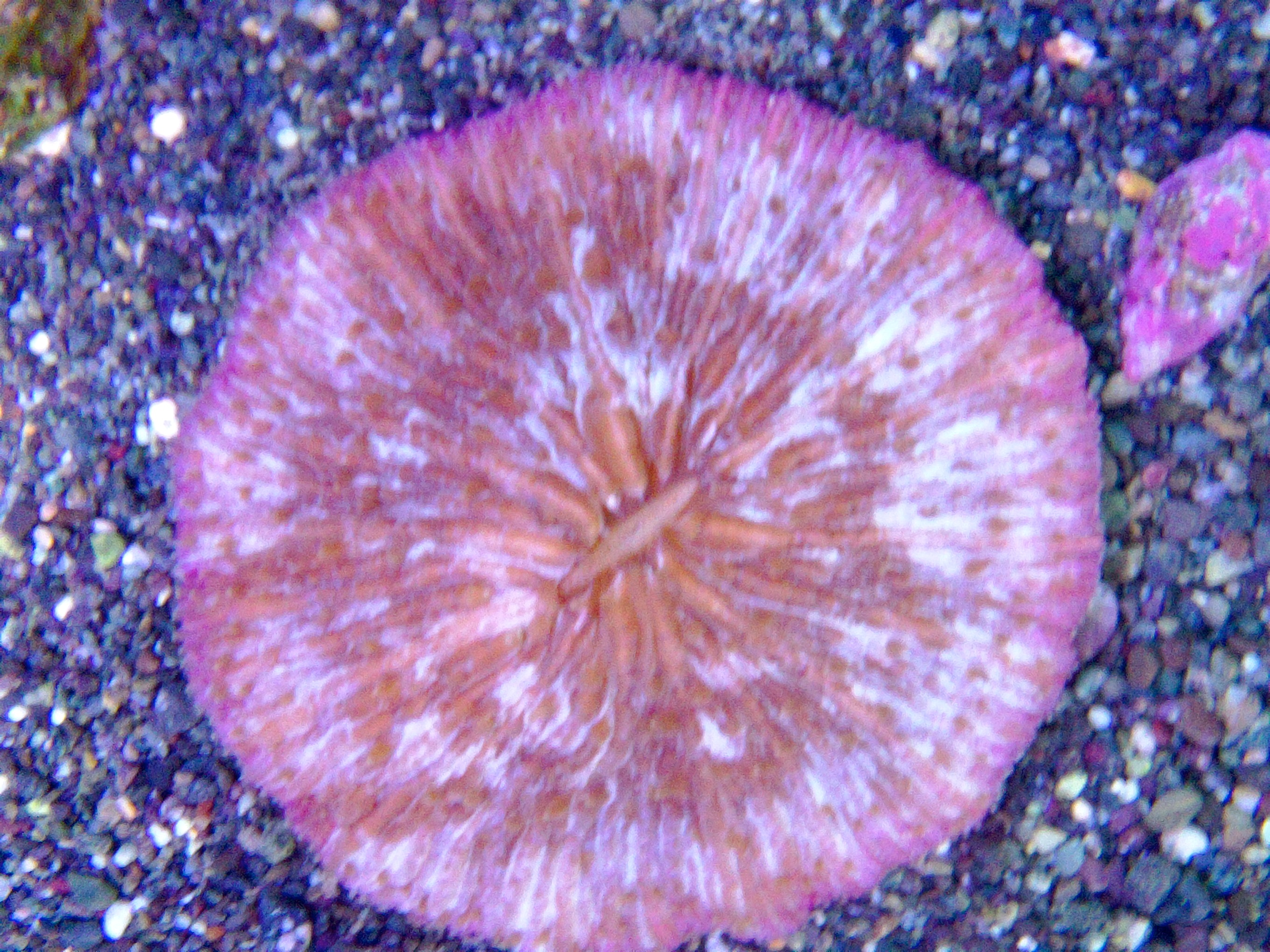

Conservation status
- Endangered (IUCN 3.1)

Scientific classification
- Kingdom: Animalia
- Phylum: Cnidaria
- Subphylum: Anthozoa
- Class: Hexacorallia
- Order: Scleractinia
- Family: Fungiidae
- Genus: Pleuractis
- Species: P. paumotensis

Binomial name
- Pleuractis paumotensis (Stuchbury, 1833)

Synonyms
- List: Fungia carcharias Studer, 1878; Fungia paumotensis Stuchbury, 1833; Fungia proechinata Döderlein, 1901; Fungia subpaumotensis † Umbgrove, 1946

= Pleuractis paumotensis =

Species of coral

Pleuractis paumotensis, commonly called Plate coral, is a species of stony coral with a single large polyp. Plate coral are commonly kept in marine aquaria.

== Description ==
Pleuractis paumotensis is a solitary, non-colonial coral that is free living and not attached to the seabed. It is an elongated oval in shape and can grow to a very large size. The polyp can be up to 25 centimetres (9.8 in) long and is embedded in a cup shaped hollow known as a corallite, surrounded by calcareous material. Lining this are narrow ribs known as septa. Outside the corallite wall the ribs continue, now known as costae, bearing rows of tiny spines. The colour is usually brown. The polyp has a central, slit-like mouth and a small number of short, tapering tentacles.

== Distribution and habitat ==
Pleuractis paumotensis occurs in the Indian Ocean on upper reef slopes especially where there is considerable movement of the water as a result of wave action. It is usually found on sand or beds of coral fragments. It is often associated with other species of Fungia.
