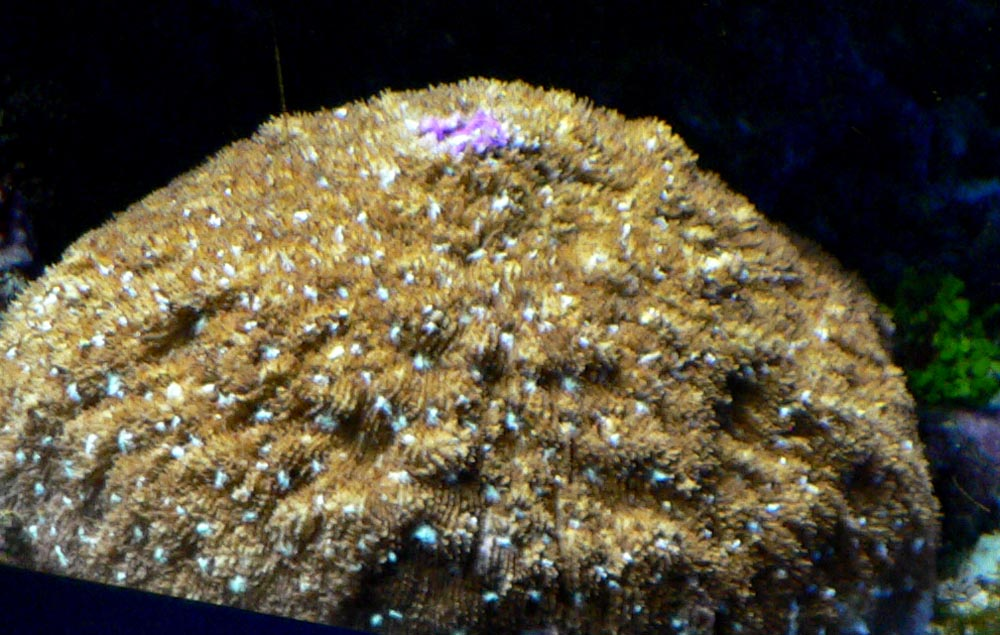
- Sandalolitha robusta

Conservation status
- Least Concern (IUCN 3.1)

Scientific classification
- Kingdom: Animalia
- Phylum: Cnidaria
- Subphylum: Anthozoa
- Class: Hexacorallia
- Order: Scleractinia
- Family: Fungiidae
- Genus: Sandalolitha
- Species: S. robusta

Binomial name
- Sandalolitha robusta (Quelch, 1886)

Synonyms
- List: Fungia pileus oblonga Lamarck, 1815; Halomitra irregularis Gardiner, 1898; Halomitra robusta (Quelch, 1886); Parahalomitra irregularis (Gardiner, 1898); Parahalomitra robusta (Quelch, 1886); Podabacia robusta Quelch, 1886

= Sandalolitha robusta =

Species of coral

Sandalolitha robusta is a plate or mushroom coral in the family Fungiidae. This coral is found in the Indo-Pacific region.

== Description ==
Sandalolitha robusta is a large, heavy colonial coral that is free living, not being attached to the substrate. The numerous individual corallites, in which the polyps are embedded, are separate from each other. They are bordered by alternating wide and narrow septa, calcareous ridges which bear serrated spines. The spines on the costae, the ridges which join the septa to other corallites, are minutely spiny. The polyps normally extend their tentacles to feed only at night.
