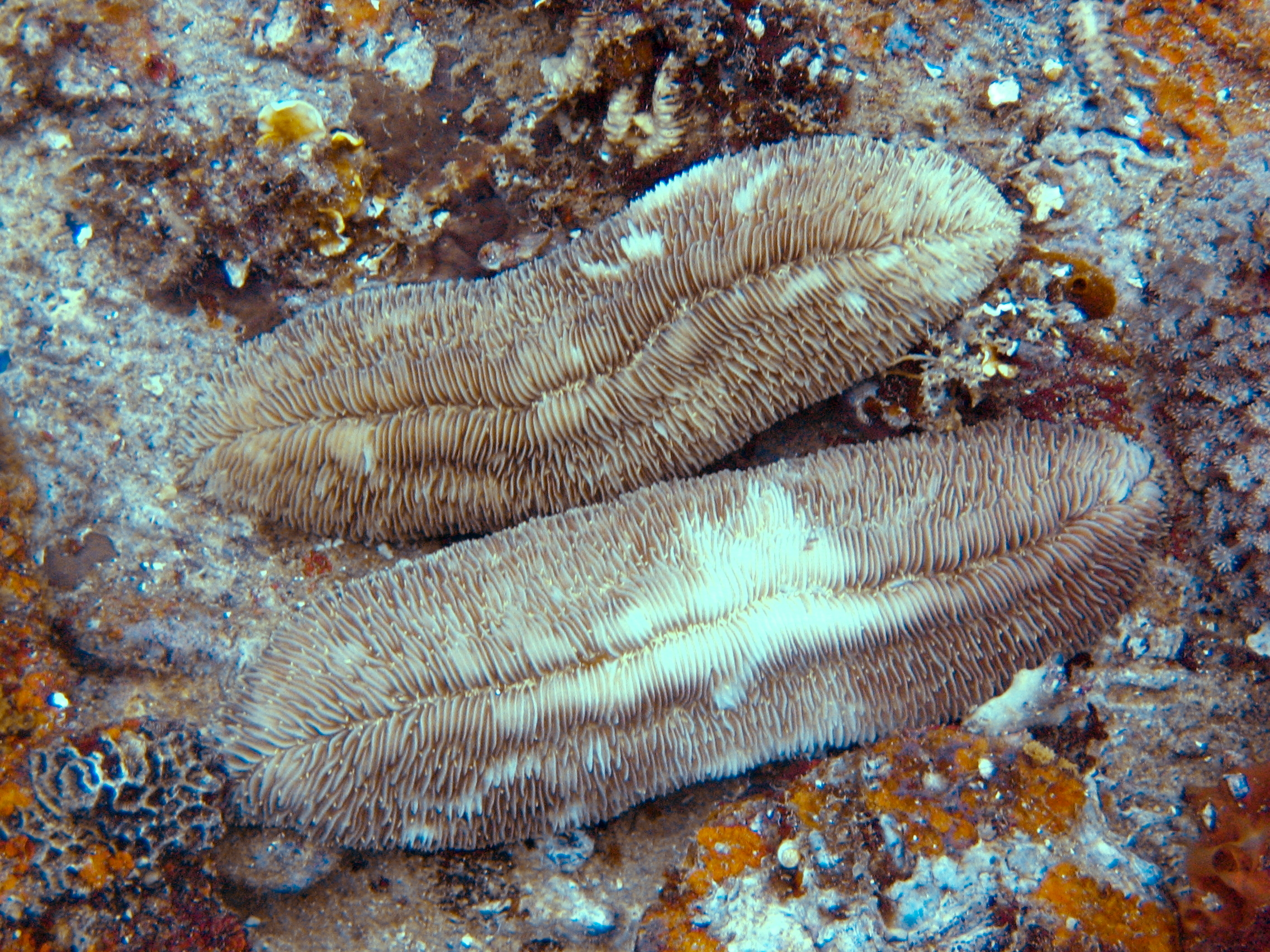

Conservation status
- Least Concern (IUCN 3.1)

Scientific classification
- Kingdom: Animalia
- Phylum: Cnidaria
- Subphylum: Anthozoa
- Class: Hexacorallia
- Order: Scleractinia
- Family: Fungiidae
- Genus: Herpolitha; Eschscholtz, 1825
- Species: H. limax

Binomial name
- Herpolitha limax (Esper, 1797)

Synonyms
- List (Genus): Haliglossa Ehrenberg, 1834; Herpetolitha Milne Edwards & Haime, 1851; Herpetolithas Leuckart, 1841; Herpetolithus Leuckart, 1841; (Species): Fungia limacina Lamarck, 1801; Fungia praecursor Umbgrove, 1946 †; Fungia weberi Van der Horst, 1921; Haliglossa foliosa Ehrenberg, 1834; Haliglossa interrupta Ehrenberg, 1834; Haliglossa stellaris Ehrenberg, 1834; Herpetoglossa secunda Nemenzo, 1988; Herpetolitha ampla Verrill, 1864; Herpetolitha foliosa (Ehrenberg, 1834); Herpetolithus crassus Dana, 1846; Herpetolithus strictus Dana, 1846; Herpolitha weberi (van der Horst, 1921); Madrepora limax Esper, 1797; Madrepora talpa Houttuyn, 1772; Madrepora trilinguis Boddaert, 1768; Sandalolitha africana Veron, 2000

= Herpolitha =

Herpolitha limax

Genus of corals

Herpolitha is a monotypic genus of mushroom corals in the family Fungiidae. The only member of the genus is Herpolitha limax, commonly known as the tongue, slipper, mole or striate boomerang coral. It is a free-living species and is native to reefs and lagoons in the Indo-Pacific region. The International Union for Conservation of Nature has assessed this coral as being of "least concern".

== Description ==
Herpolitha limax has an elongated structure with somewhat rounded ends and a single, central, axial furrow that extends nearly from end to end. In the furrow are many conspicuous slit-like mouths and there are irregularly spaced, less-distinct mouths elsewhere. The primary septa are densely-toothed with fine spines and do not reach the edge of the colony. The costae are low with crowded, obtuse teeth. Sometimes the furrow is forked and forms a "Y" shape, a "T" shape, or even an "X" shape. This coral can grow to a length of 45 cm (18 in) or more and is usually some shade of grey, brown or greenish-brown.

== Distribution ==
Herpolitha limax is native to the Indo-Pacific region, its range extending from East Africa and the Red Sea to Australia, Indonesia, Papua New Guinea and the South Central Pacific. It is found on reef slopes and in lagoons, often in close proximity to Fungia spp. at depths down to about 30 metres (98 ft).

== Ecology ==
Herpolitha limax is a colonial, free-living, zooxanthellate species of coral. Under stressful conditions it is susceptible to bleaching and corals appear white after expelling their symbionts. In a period of high water temperature in Thailand in June 2010, bleaching was common and 52% of the corals of this species were affected, along with many other species of mushroom coral. By the following February, they seemed to have recovered with no trace of thermal-induced bleaching being present, and the species composition being similar to that before the bleaching event.

== Status ==
Herpolitha limax has a very wide range and is a common species in suitable habitats. The population trend is unknown but this coral is harvested for the reef aquarium trade, over 2,000 pieces being collected in 2005. Corals face threats associated with climate change but the International Union for Conservation of Nature has assessed the conservation status of this species as being of "least concern".
