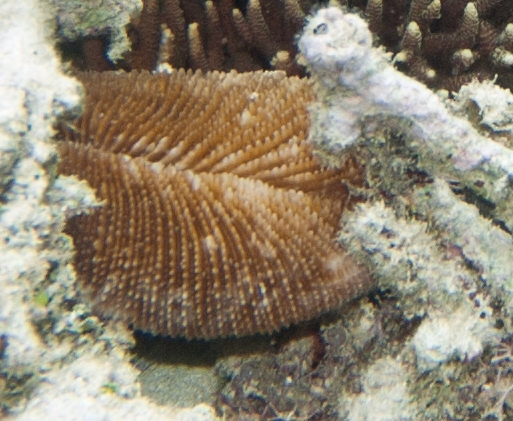

Conservation status
- Least Concern (IUCN 3.1)

Scientific classification
- Kingdom: Animalia
- Phylum: Cnidaria
- Subphylum: Anthozoa
- Class: Hexacorallia
- Order: Scleractinia
- Family: Fungiidae
- Genus: Ctenactis
- Species: C. echinata

Binomial name
- Ctenactis echinata (Pallas, 1766)

Synonyms
- List: Fungia asperata Dana, 1846; Fungia echinata (Pallas, 1766); Fungia ehrenbergi (Leuckart, 1841); Fungia gigantea Dana, 1846; Fungia pectinata Ehrenberg, 1834; Haliglossa echinata (Pallas, 1766); Herpetolithas ehrenbergii Leuckart, 1841; Herpetolithas ruepellii Leuckart, 1841; Madrepora echinata Pallas, 1766

= Ctenactis echinata =

Species of coral

Ctenactis echinata is a free-living species of solitary disc coral in the family Fungiidae. It is native to the Indo-Pacific region. This is a common species throughout its wide range and the International Union for Conservation of Nature has rated its conservation status as being of "least concern".

== Description ==
Ctenactis echinata is a medium to large oval disc coral, growing to a length of about 25 cm (10 in) and a width of 10 cm (4 in). It has an axial furrow extending along most of its length with usually a single mouth opening, but occasionally there may be more than one. The primary septa are thick and heavily toothed with large triangular teeth. In between them are one to five secondary septa, smaller and lightly toothed. A large individual may have more than a thousand septa. The costae, on the underside of the coral, are poorly defined and have long arborescent or cylindrical spines arranged in radial rows. The colour of this coral is usually pale brown.

== Distribution and habitat ==
Ctenactis echinata is native to the Indo-Pacific region. Its range extends from the Red Sea and Indian Ocean to China, Japan, Indonesia and northern Australia, as well as various island groups in the western and central Pacific Ocean. It is found on reef flats and slopes and in lagoons to depths of 20 m (66 ft).
