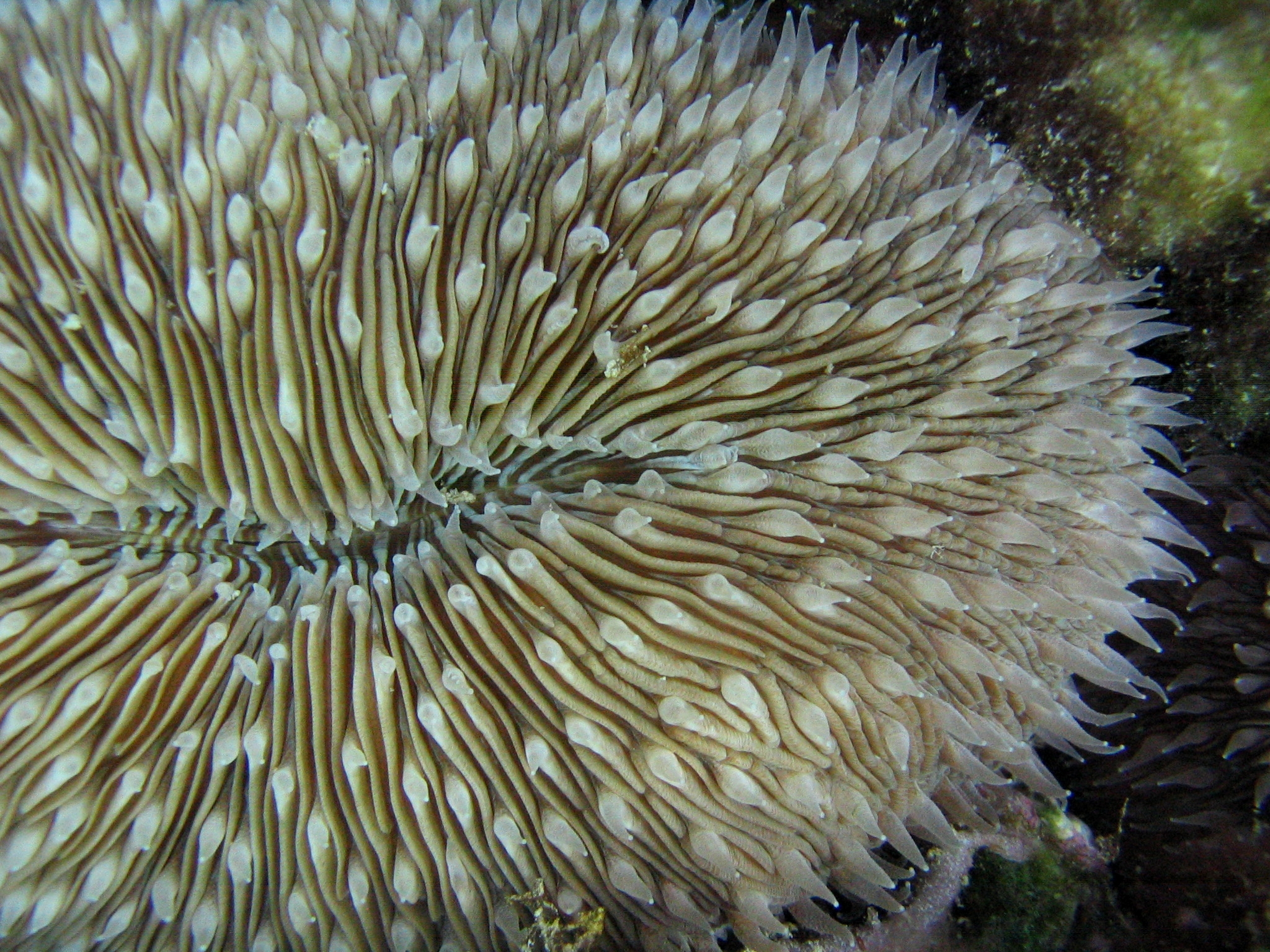

Conservation status
- Least Concern (IUCN 3.1)

Scientific classification
- Kingdom: Animalia
- Phylum: Cnidaria
- Subphylum: Anthozoa
- Class: Hexacorallia
- Order: Scleractinia
- Family: Fungiidae
- Genus: Lobactis; Verrill, 1864
- Species: L. scutaria

Binomial name
- Lobactis scutaria (Lamarck, 1801)

Synonyms
- List (Genus): Fungia (Lobactis) Verrill, 1864; (Species): Fungia dentigera Leuckart, 1841; Fungia oahensis Döderlein, 1901; Fungia placunaria Klunzinger, 1879; Fungia scutaria Lamarck, 1801; Fungia tenuidens Quelch, 1886; Fungia verrilliana Quelch, 1886; Lobactis conferta Verrill, 1864; Lobactis danae Verrill, 1864

= Lobactis =

Lobactis scutaria

Genus of corals

Lobactis is a genus of plate or mushroom coral in the family Fungiidae. The genus is monotypic with a single species, Lobactis scutaria, that is found in the Indo-Pacific region.

== Description ==
Lobactis scutaria is a solitary, non-colonial coral that is free living and not attached to the seabed. It is discoid or elongated in shape and can grow to a very large size. The polyp can be up to 17 centimetres (6.7 in) long and is embedded in a cup shaped hollow known as a corallite, surrounded by calcareous material. Lining this are narrow ribs known as septa, each having a tall tentacular lobe near its origin in the centre. The septa bear unlobed teeth and further tentacular lobes at intervals where the septa divide. Outside the corallite the ribs continue, now known as costae, bearing rows of tiny spines. The underside of the coral bears a scar resulting from its detachment from the sea bed as a juvenile. The colour varies, often being brown, yellowish or blue with contrasting tentacular lobes. The polyp has a central, slit-like mouth and a small number of short, tapering tentacles.

== Distribution and habitat ==
Lobactis scutaria occurs in the Indian Ocean on upper reef slopes especially where there is considerable movement of the water as a result of wave action. It is usually found on sand or beds of coral fragments. It is often associated with other species of Fungia.

== Biology ==
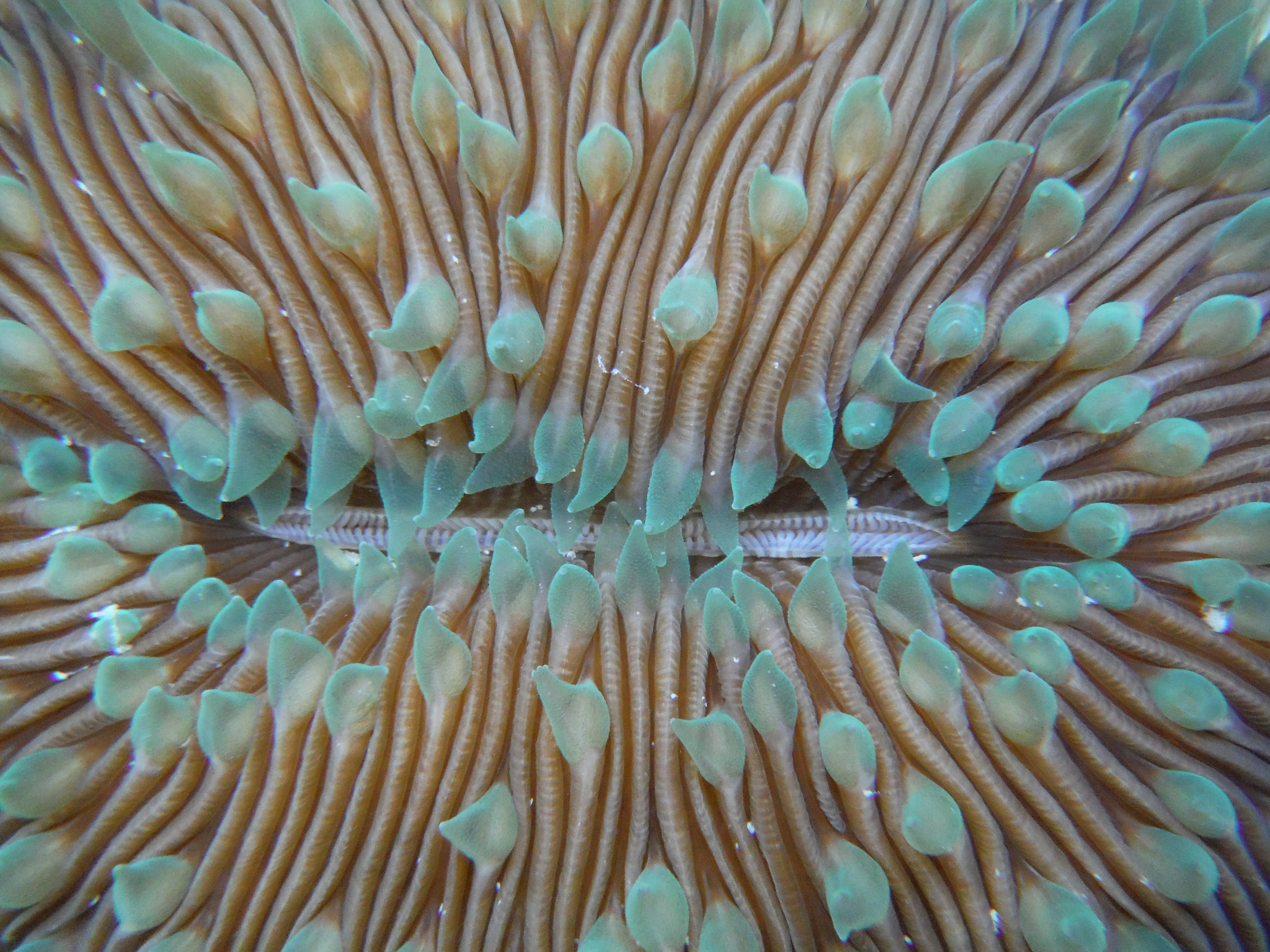
Lobactis scutaria mouth

Lobactis scutaria is a carnivore and catches plankton, shrimps and fish with its tentacles.

Lobactis scutaria is a hermaphrodite. Eggs and sperm are ejected through the mouth and after fertilisation, develop into planula larvae which form part of the plankton. After some time these settle on the seabed and undergo metamorphosis. The juveniles attach themselves to the substrate and start feeding, extruding their hard skeletons and growing. At a later stage they become detached from their base and drift around on the sea bed. The polyps feed by day as well as by night.
