= Palma Aquarium =

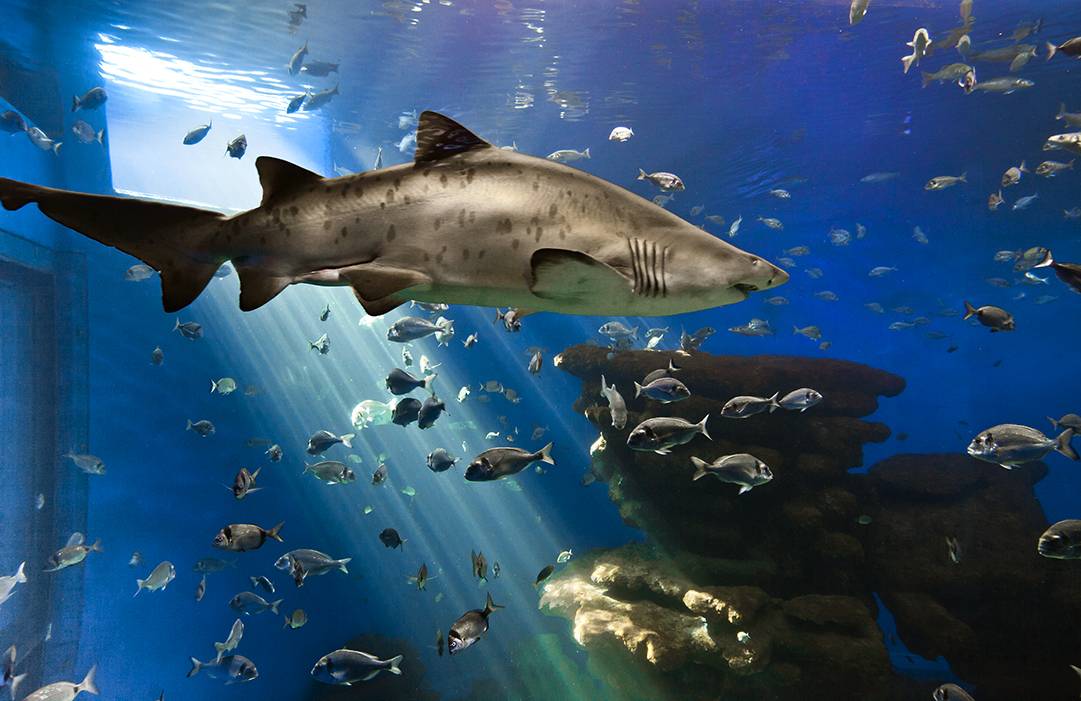
- Palma Aquarium, the "Big Blue" tank
- Interactive map of Palma Aquarium
- 39°31′53″N 2°43′46″E
- Date opened: 2007
- Location: Manuela de los Herreros i Sorà, 21, 07610, Palma de Mallorca, Spain
- No. of animals: 8,000
- No. of species: 700
- Volume of largest tank: 3,500,000 L (920,000 US gal)
- Total volume of tanks: 5,000,000 L (1,300,000 US gal)
- Major exhibits: 55
- Website: http://www.palmaaquarium.com/eng/

Palma Aquarium is a commercial aquarium and park that first opened in 2007 in Palma, Mallorca, Spain. The aquarium is the property of Coral World International. The aquarium is 500 m (1,600 ft) from Playa de Palma beach, and includes 55 tanks which are home to over 700 different species from the Mediterranean Sea and the Indian, Atlantic and Pacific Oceans. One tank, "Big Blue" is 8.5 m (28 ft) deep, the deepest shark tank in Europe, and it also contains the largest collection of live coral in Europe The park was awarded "Best Business Initiative in the Balearics 2007", awarded by Actualidad Económica magazine, and was awarded the "2007 Accessibility Prize" by the Consell de Mallorca.

The aquarium organises environmentally focused activities, and takes part in protection and conservation campaigns.

Palma Aquarium has more than 400,000 visitors every year, with an average of over 1000 visitors a day. 50% of its visitors are local and national, while the rest are mainly of European origin. Palma Aquarium has received several awards, including the "Best Business Initiative in Balearics 2007" award, awarded by Actualidad Económica magazine and the "2007 Accessibility Award", awarded by the Consell de Mallorca.

A visit to the aquarium is presented as if it were a journey through the world’s seas and oceans.

== The Mediterranean Sea ==
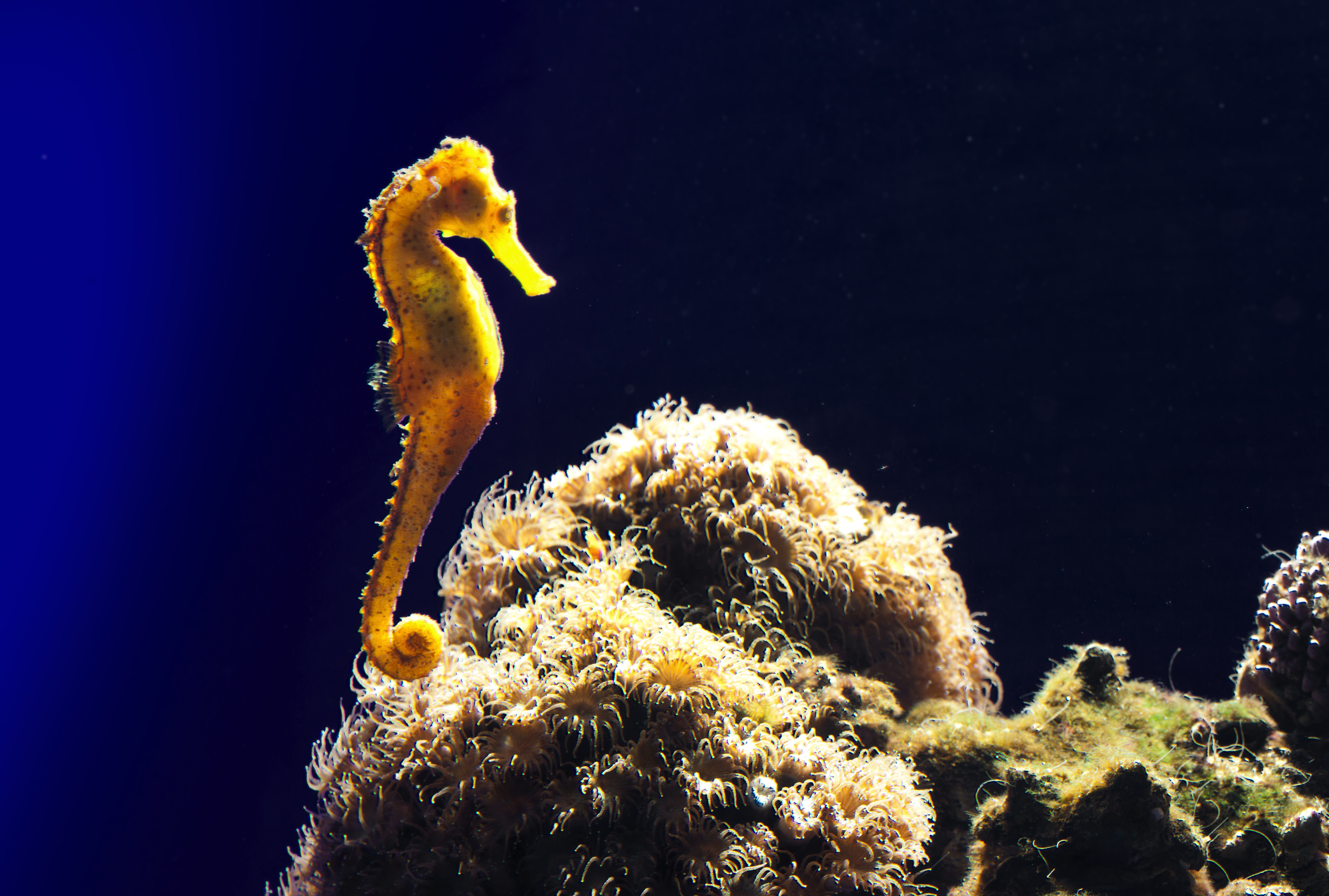
The "Mediterranean Sea" tank

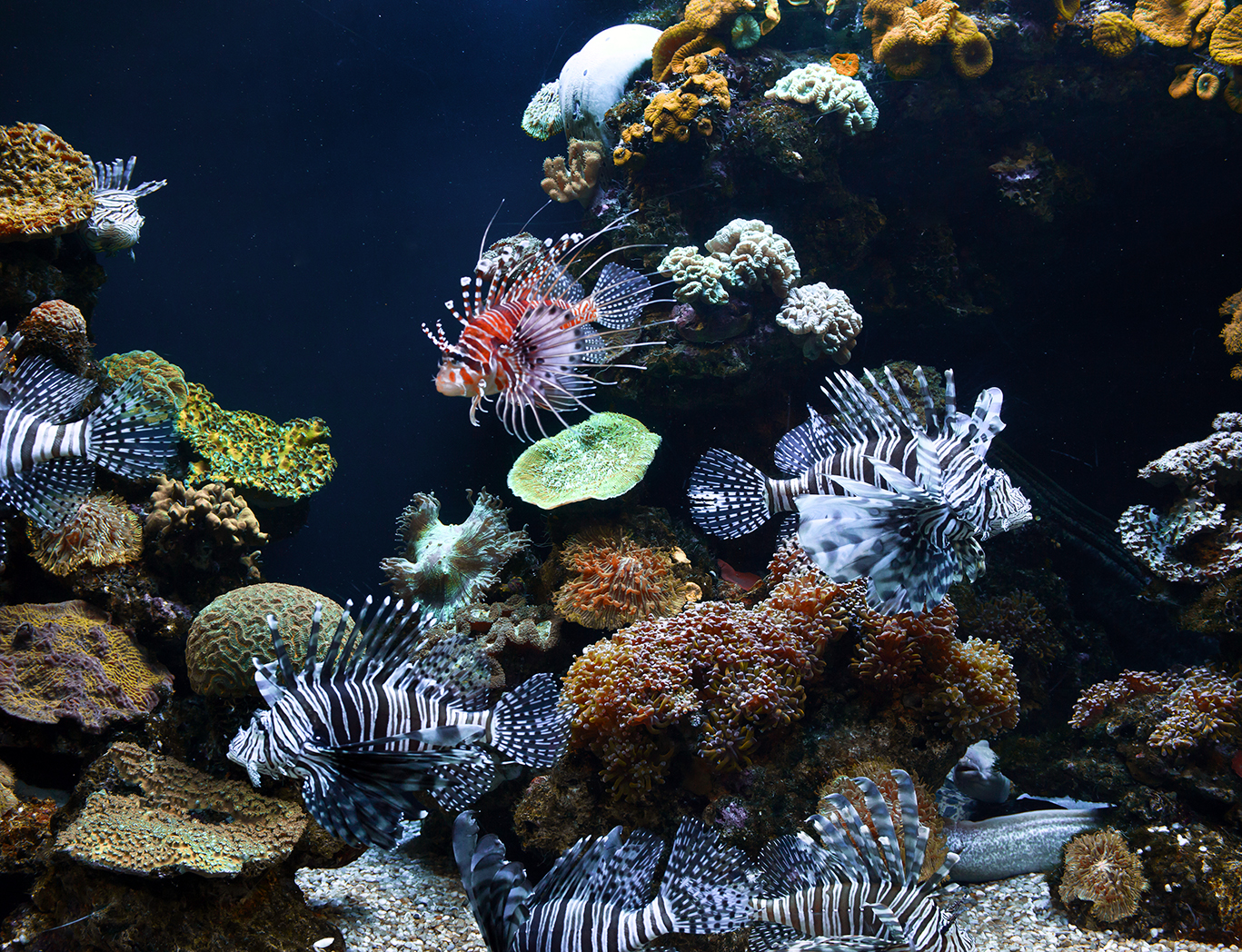
One of the "Tropical Sea" tanks

The first stage of the "journey" shows Mediterranean marine fauna and flora including starfish, lobsters and slipper lobsters, scorpion fish, wrasses, groupers, prawns and shrimps, crabs, eels, rays, seahorses, octopuses, conger eels, algae and coral. Visitors can also have direct contact with some of these animals, such as the starfish, in the Touch Pools.

== Tropical Seas ==
There are 25 aquariums in this section showing animals from the tropical parts of the Indian Ocean, Atlantic Ocean and Pacific Ocean. These animals include the fire fish, the clown fish, the black widow tetra, the surgeon fish, the blacktip reef shark, and bright colourful coral.

The Palma Aquarium live coral includes gorgonians, mushroom, fragile saucer and honeycomb; anemones such as the Carpet, Caribbean or the Long Tentacle; and a great variety of tropical sponges. It is one of the few aquariums in Europe where all the coral decorating the tanks is real and alive, and one of the few aquariums to have its own coral reproduction program, which has resulted in the birth of new coral colonies on site.

== Mediterranean Gardens ==
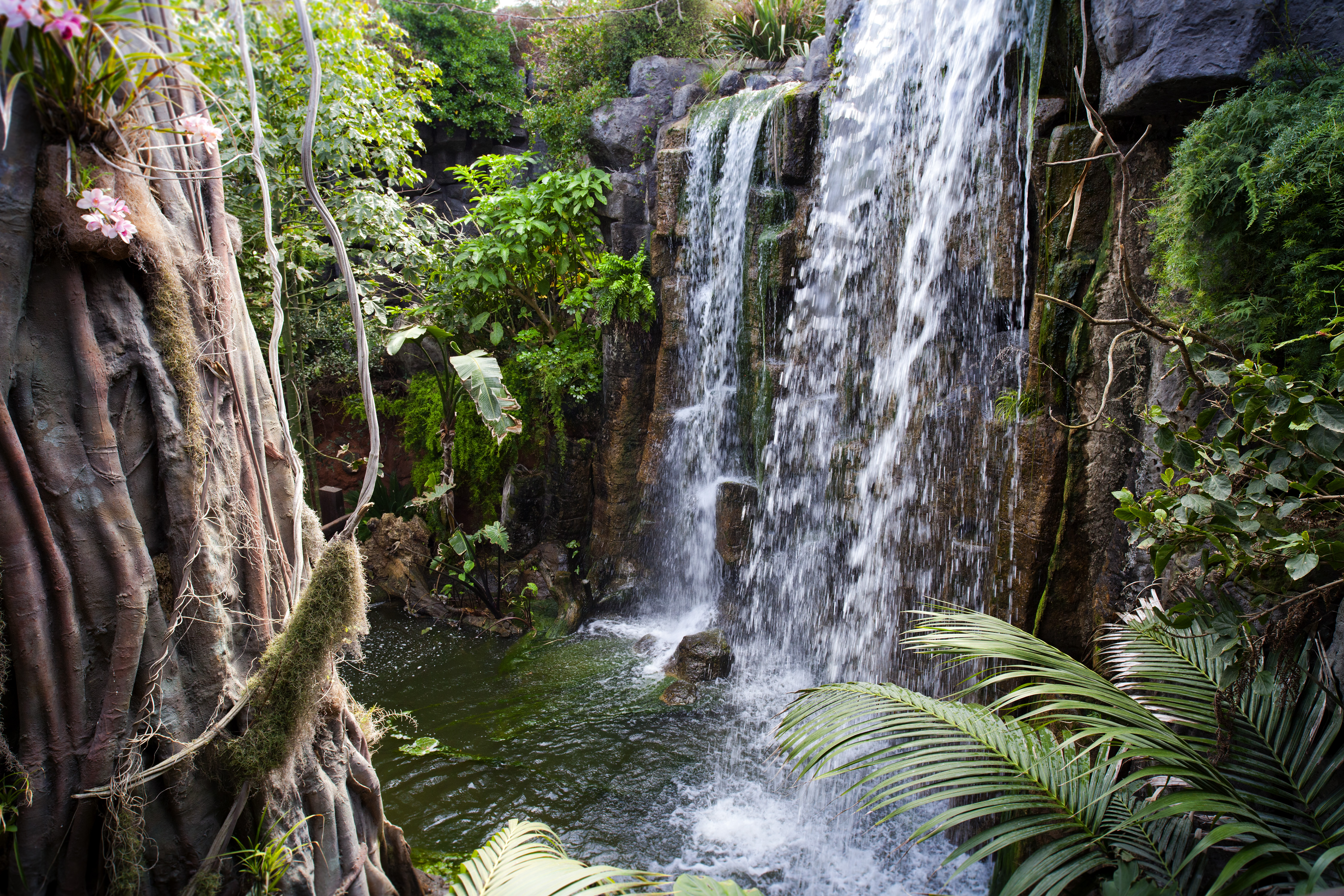
The "Jungle"

There is a garden area which combines Mediterranean plants with tanks containing turtles, koi fish, gilthead bream and stingrays. Also available here is a cafeteria and a children’s play area with a "pirate ship". During the summer, the park has children’s entertainment every day of the week, featuring face-painting, water fights and shows.

== The Jungle ==
The Jungle area is designed to resemble a tropical rainforest. It is the largest roof-top garden in Spain, and one of the largest in Europe. A waterfall and several vaporizers create a humid atmosphere; a suitable microclimate for the Amazonian plants that grow there.

== Big Blue ==
The Big Blue is the deepest shark tank in Europe, at 8.5 m (28 ft) deep, 33 m (108 ft) long and 25 m (82 ft) wide. The tank holds 3,500,000 L (920,000 US gal) of saltwater.

Six sand tiger sharks, 5 sandbar sharks and over 1000 fish live inside this tank. Visitors descend to the central aquarium’s observation area via a transparent tunnel, while sharks and rays swim over their heads.

== Jellyfish tank ==
The Jellyfish tank is a cylinder-shaped aquarium containing about fifty jellyfish almost all of which belong to the Mediterranean’s common species, Aurelia aurita.

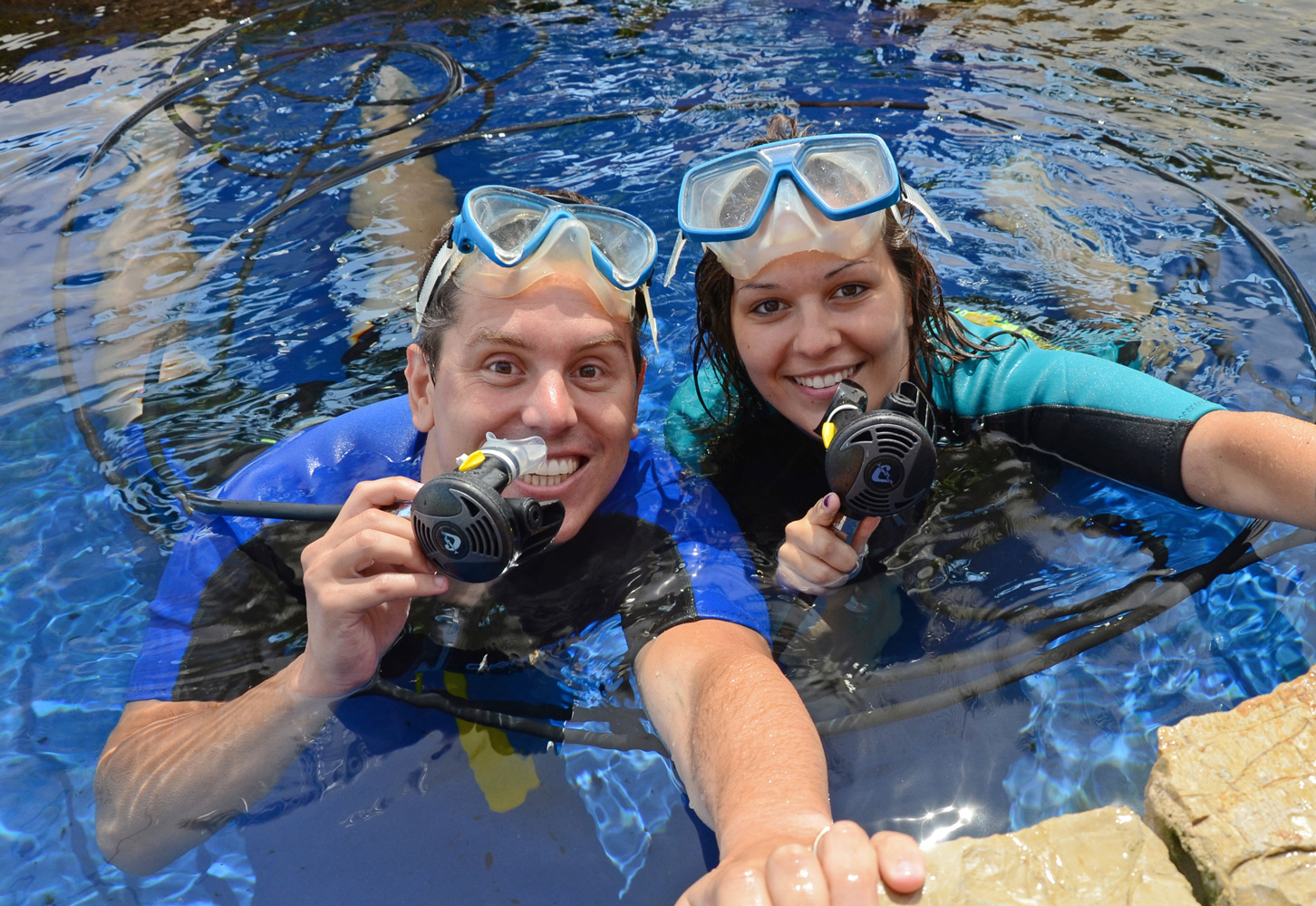
Underwater

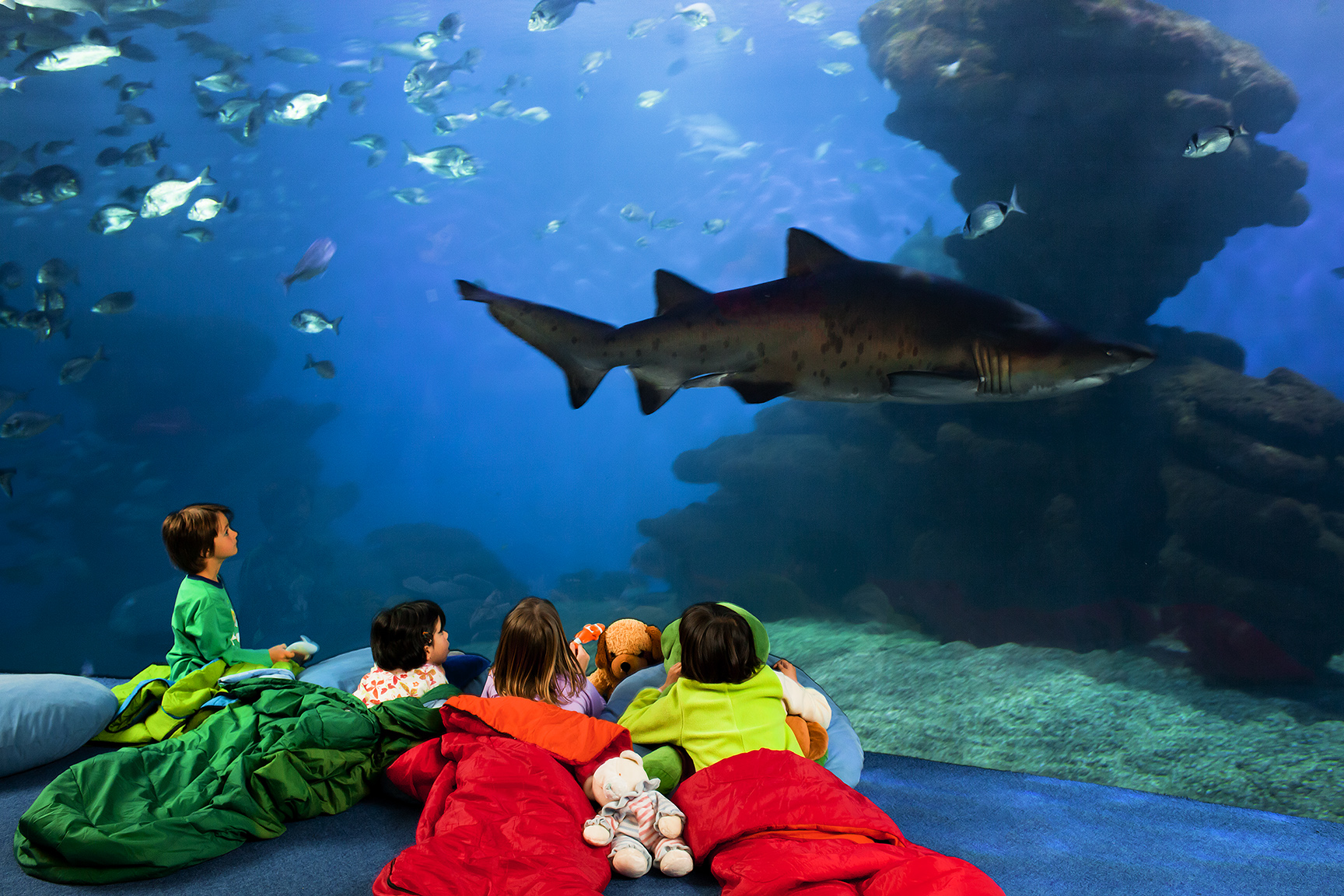
The "Shark sleepover"

== Activities ==
A number of different activities are available:

- "Dive with the Sharks". An activity for adults and children.
- "Underwater". In the summer, visitors over the age of eight can swim in the stingray tank, located in the Mediterranean Gardens.
- "Shark Sleepover'". Children between the ages of 6 and 16 spend the night camping out in front of the Big Blue, the shark tank.
- "Birthdays'. Children can celebrate their birthdays at the park with themed pirate parties.

== Marine species ==
The Palma Aquarium is home to over 700 different species from the Mediterranean Sea, and the Indian, Atlantic and Pacific Oceans.

The Mediterranean Sea:

- Asteroidea (Common starfish)
- Palinurus elephas (Spiny lobsters)
- Scyllarides latus (Mediterranean slipper lobster)
- Trachinus draco (Greater weaver)
- Symphodus tinca (East Atlantic peacock wrasse)
- Epinephelus marginatus (Dusky Grouper)
- Caridea (Caridean shrimp)
- Muraena helena (Mediterranean moray eel)
- Rajiformes (Rays)
- Hippocampus species, (Seahorse)
- Octopoda (Octopus)
- Conger conger (European conger)
- Actiniaria (Sea anemones)
- Pennatulacea (Sea pen)
- Corallium rubrum (Red coral)
- Caulerpa species (Caulerpa)
- Ascidiacea (Sea squirts)
- Holothuria species (Sea cucumber)
- Paracentrotus lividus (Sea urchin)

Tropical Seas:

- Alcyonacea (Gorgonia)
- Fungia scutaria (Mushroom coral)
- Pseudanthias squamipinnis (Anthias tropical)
- Labridae (Wrasse)
- Amphiprion ocellaris (Clownfish)
- Pterois antennata (Broadbarred firefish)
- Zebrasoma flavescens (Surgeon fish)
- Ensis species (Razor clam)
- Syngnathinae (Pipefish)
- Synchiropus splendidus (Mandarinfish)
- Ostracion cubicus (Box fish)
- Gobio (Gudgeon)
- Porifera (Sponges)
- Carcharhinus melanopterus (Blacktip reef shark)
- Hypostomus species (Red devil cichlid)
- Serrasalmus species (Piranha)

Mediterranean Gardens:

- Eretmochelys imbricata (Hawksbill turtle)
- Cyprinus carpio (Koi fish)

Big Blue:

- Rhinobatidae (Guitarfish)
- Carcharias taurus (Sand Tiger Shark)
- Carcharhinus plumbeus (Sandbar shark)
- Dicentrarchus labrax (European seabass)
- Sparus aurata (Gilt-head bream)
- Seriola dumerili (Greater amberjack)
- Mugil (Mullet)
- Myliobatis aquila (Eagle ray)
- Dasyatis pastinaca (Common stingray)
- Dentex dentex (Common dentex)
- Diplodus vulgaris (Sparidae)
- Coris julis (Mediterranean rainbow wrasse)
- Centracanthidae (Picarel)
- Chromis chromis (Chromis)

Jellyfish Tank:

- Aurelia aurita (Jellyfish)

== Gallery of fish photos from the "Tropical Seas" ==
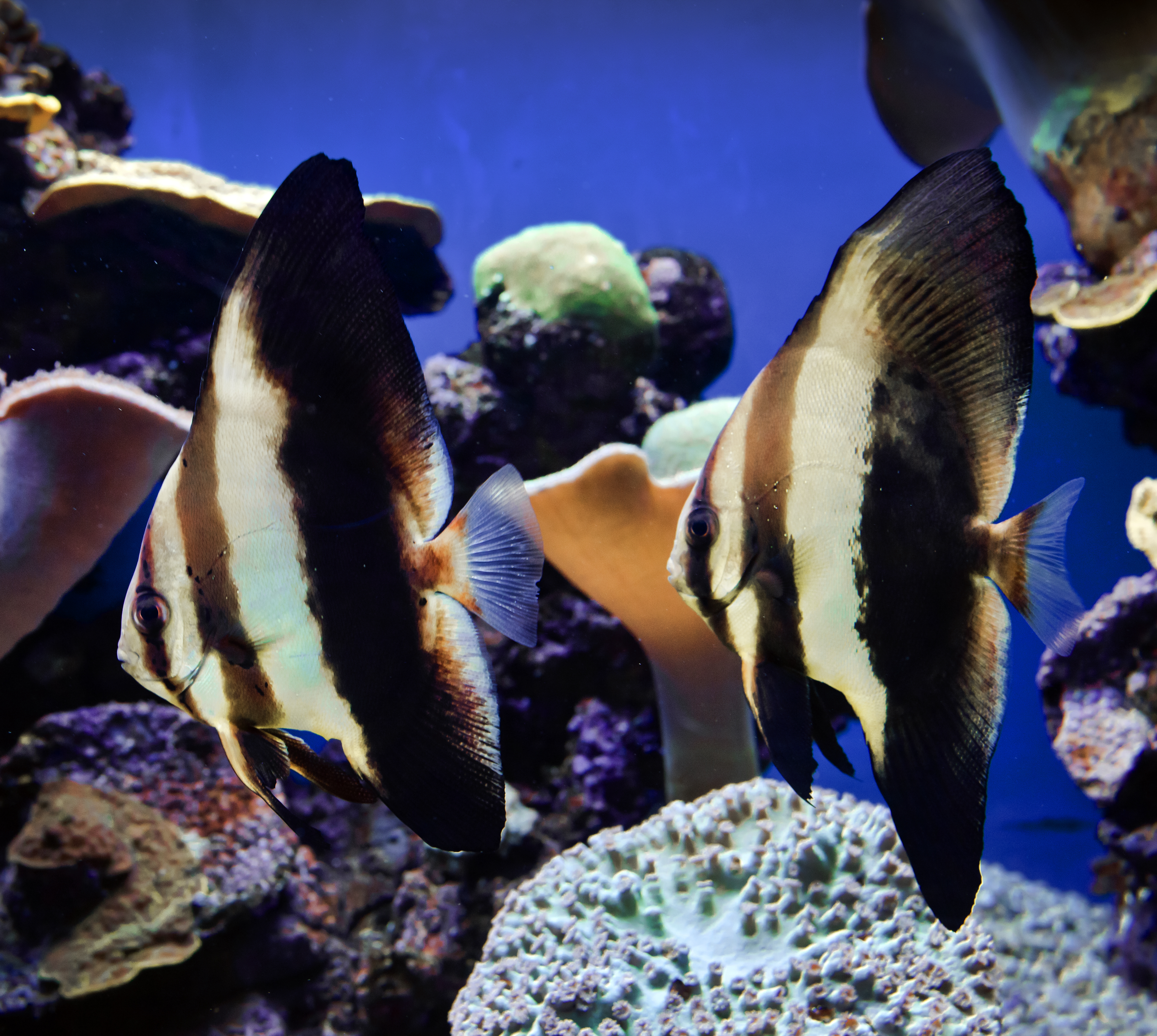
Young batfish

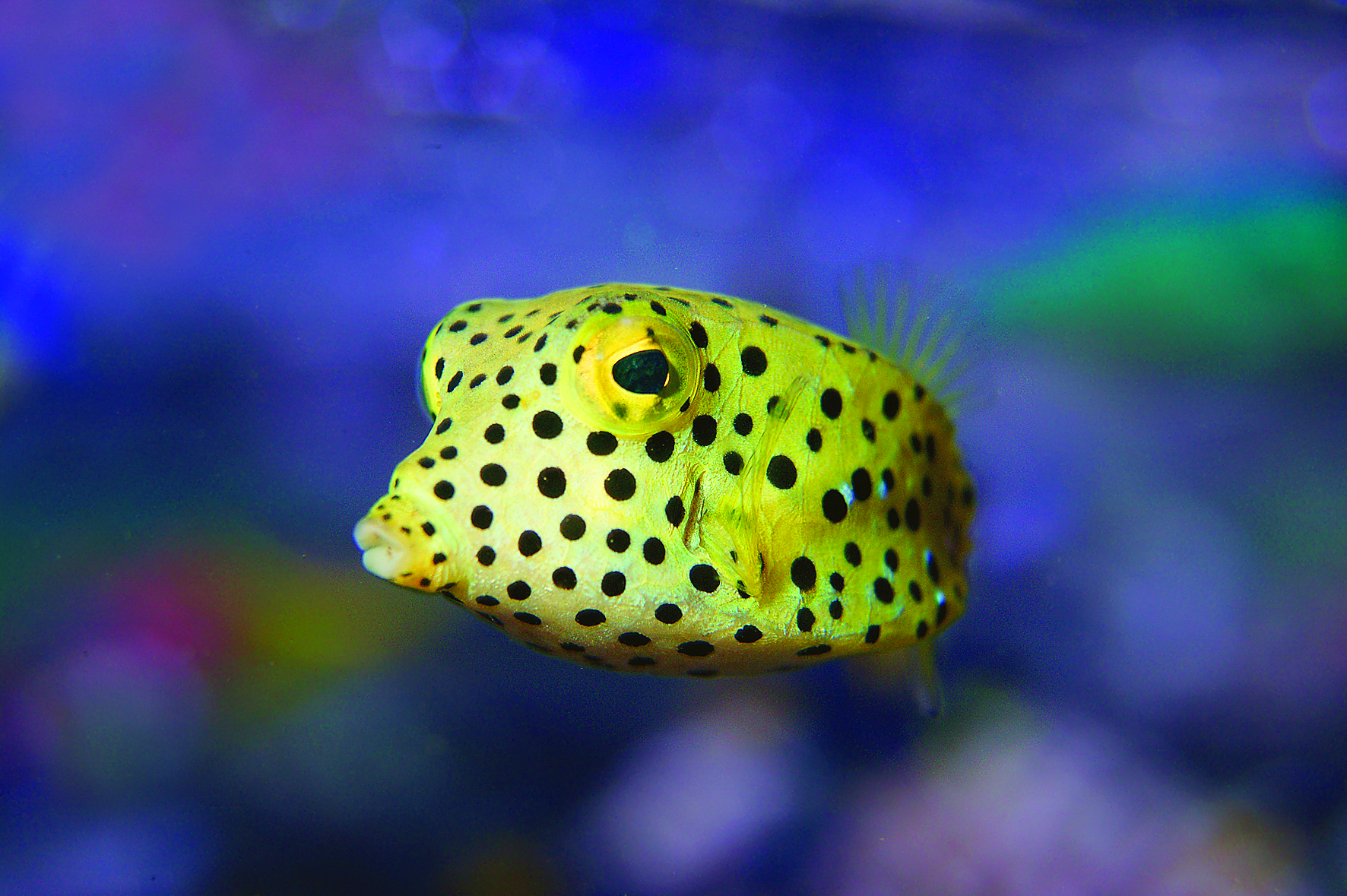
Box fish

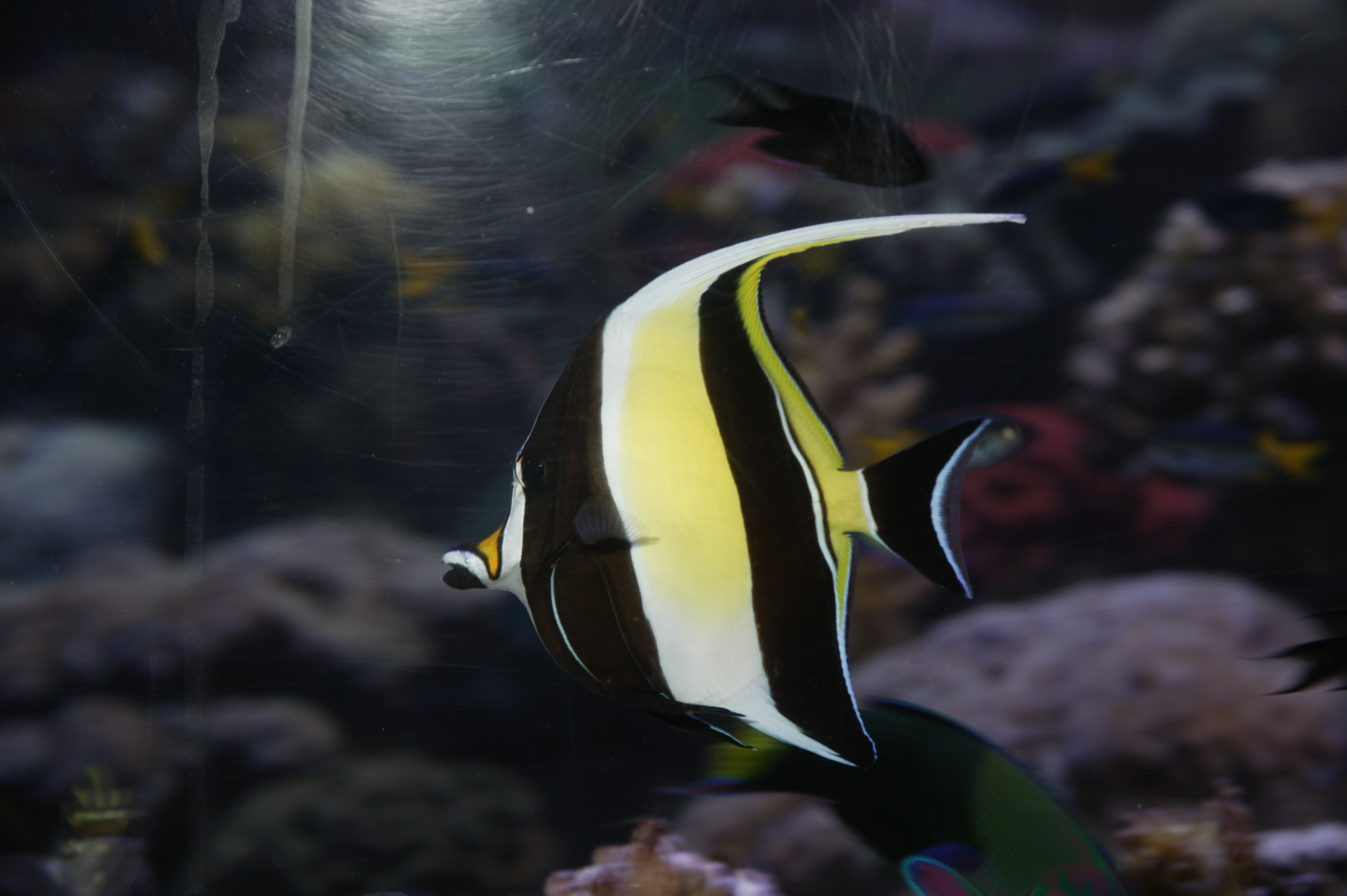
Moorish idol

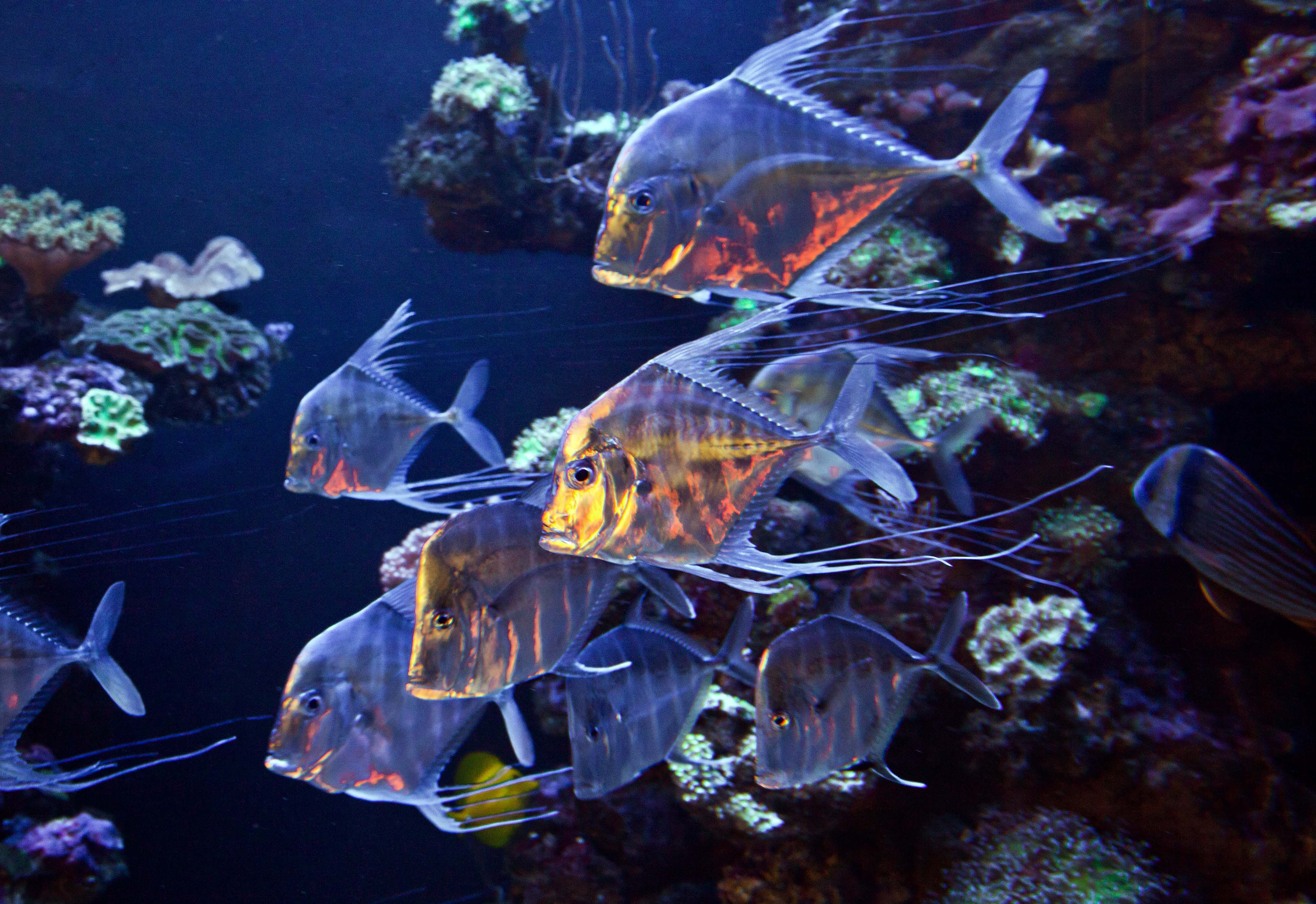
African Pompano

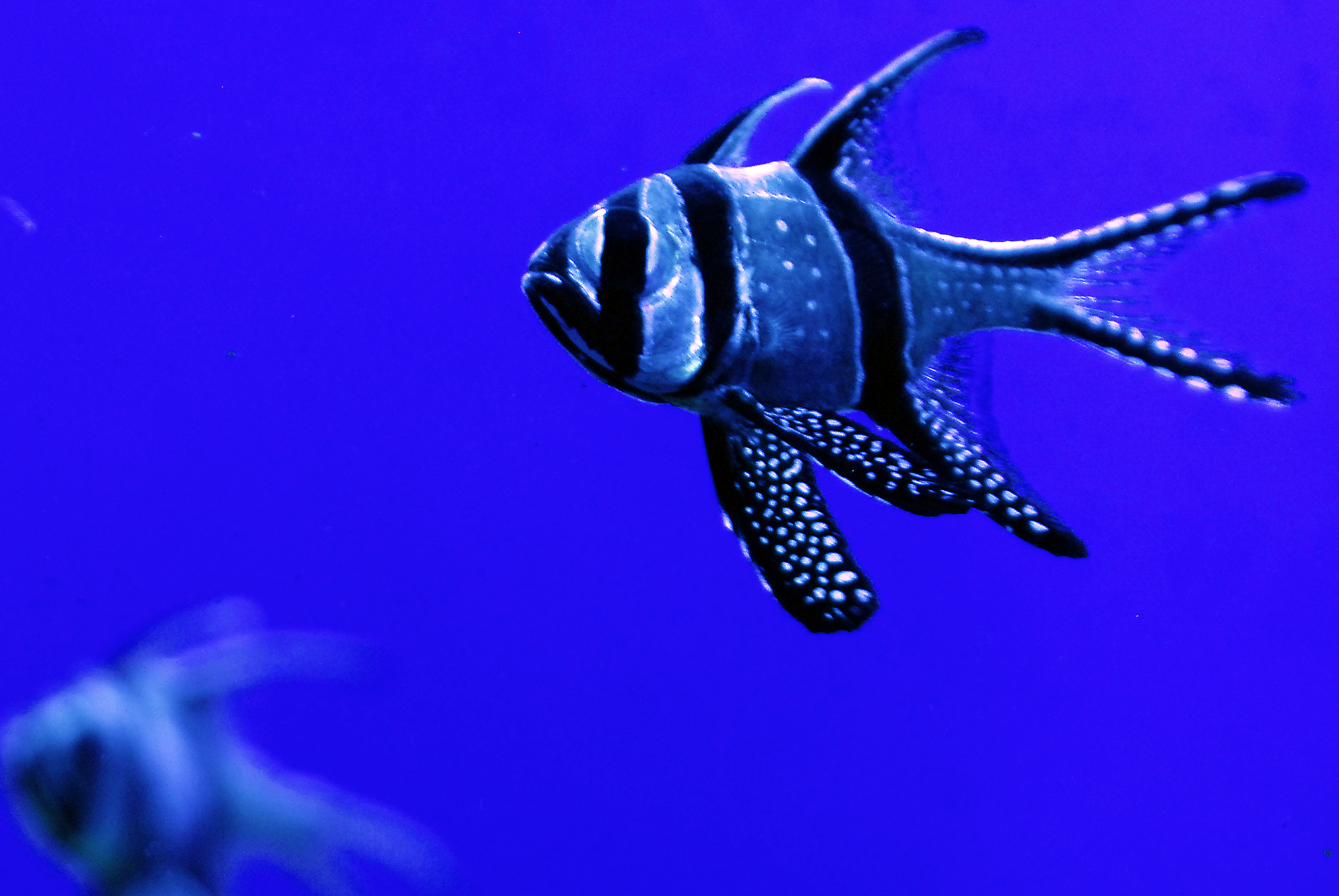
Banggai cardinalfish

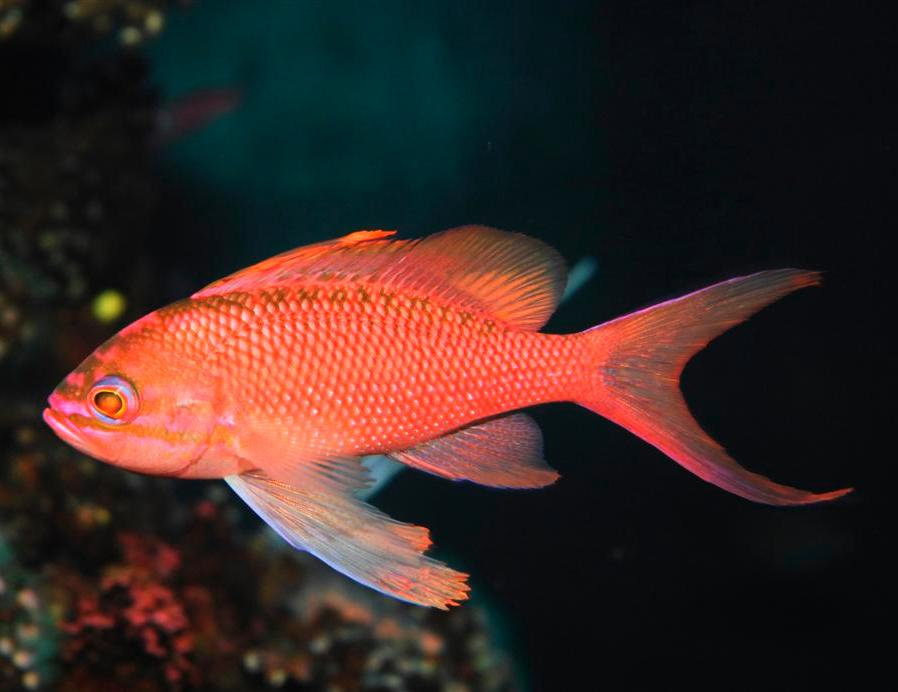
Anthias

== Research and conservation ==
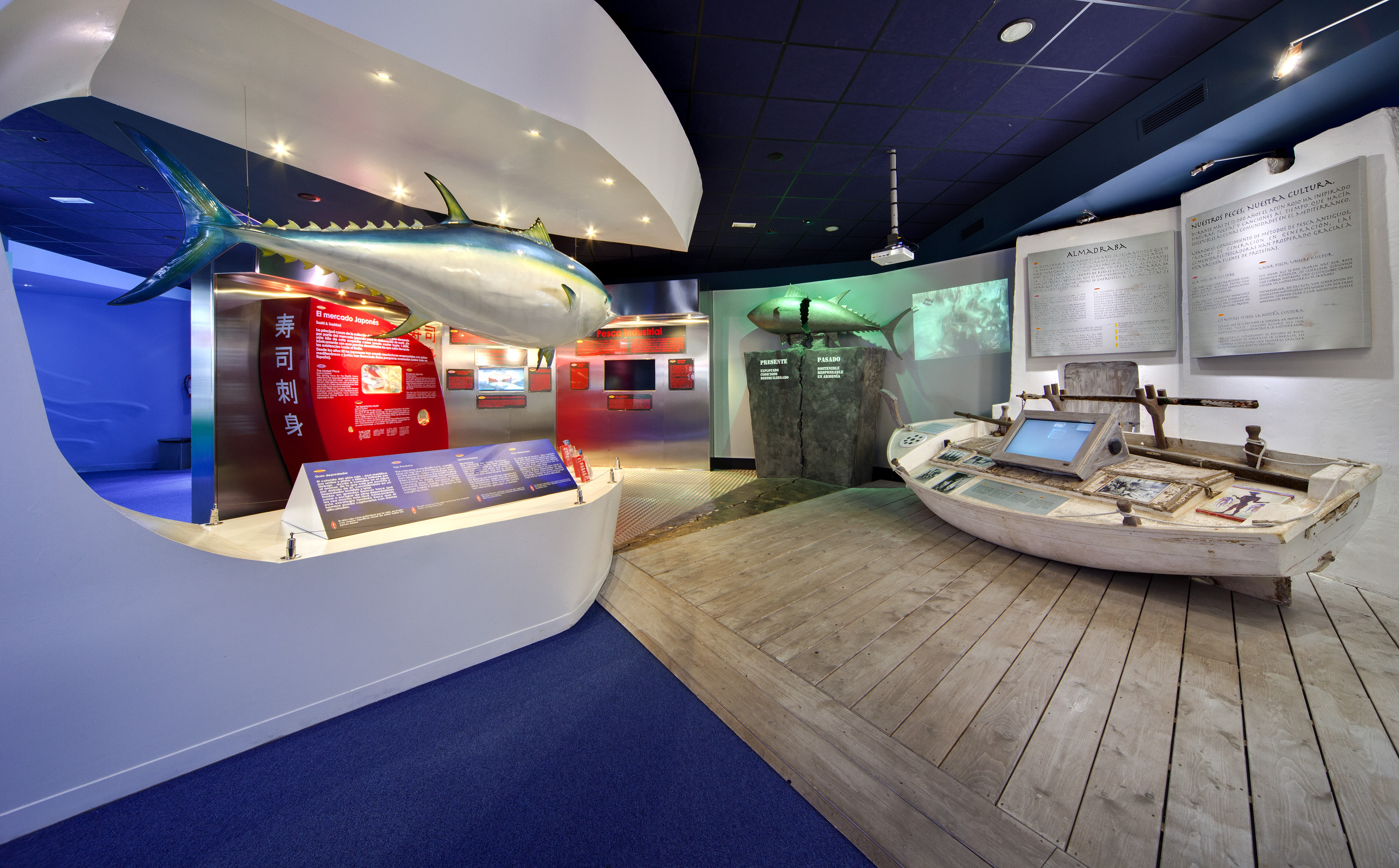
The "Save the tuna" exhibit

Palma Aquarium has a series of research and investigation programs including developing coral reef reproduction and rehabilitation programs within artificially controlled environments.

The park also runs a conservation campaign for the Mediterranean Blue Fin Tuna, a species which is in danger of extinction due to overfishing. The park also includes an exhibition on this theme.

The aquarium takes part in a conservation project for Limonium barceloi, a species which is autochthonous to the southern Balearics.

Palma Aquarium sometimes takes part in rescue and rehabilitation projects for marine animals. The research objectives are set out by collaboration agreements with universities and research centres in order to carry out recovery programmes with populations in regression or in danger of extinction.

== Facilities ==
The indoor path is 900 m (3,000 ft), and the outdoor area is 41,825 m^{2} (450,200 ft^{2}). There are 55 tanks containing 5,000,000 L (1,300,000 US gal) of sea water. There are approximately 8,000 marine specimens in approximately 700 species. The aquarium is open every day of the year. There is a 400 m^{2} (4,300 ft^{2}) gift shop, a public car park of 4,972 m^{2} (53,520 ft^{2}) and an event room, which is 329 m^{2} (3,540 ft^{2}) m2 in size and has a standing capacity of 350 people.
