= Disc coral =

Disc coral may refer to several different taxa:

- species of the genus Cycloseris
- species of the genus Ctenactis
- species of the genus Fungia
- species of the genus Turbinaria (coral)
- Montipora capricornis, a species of coral
