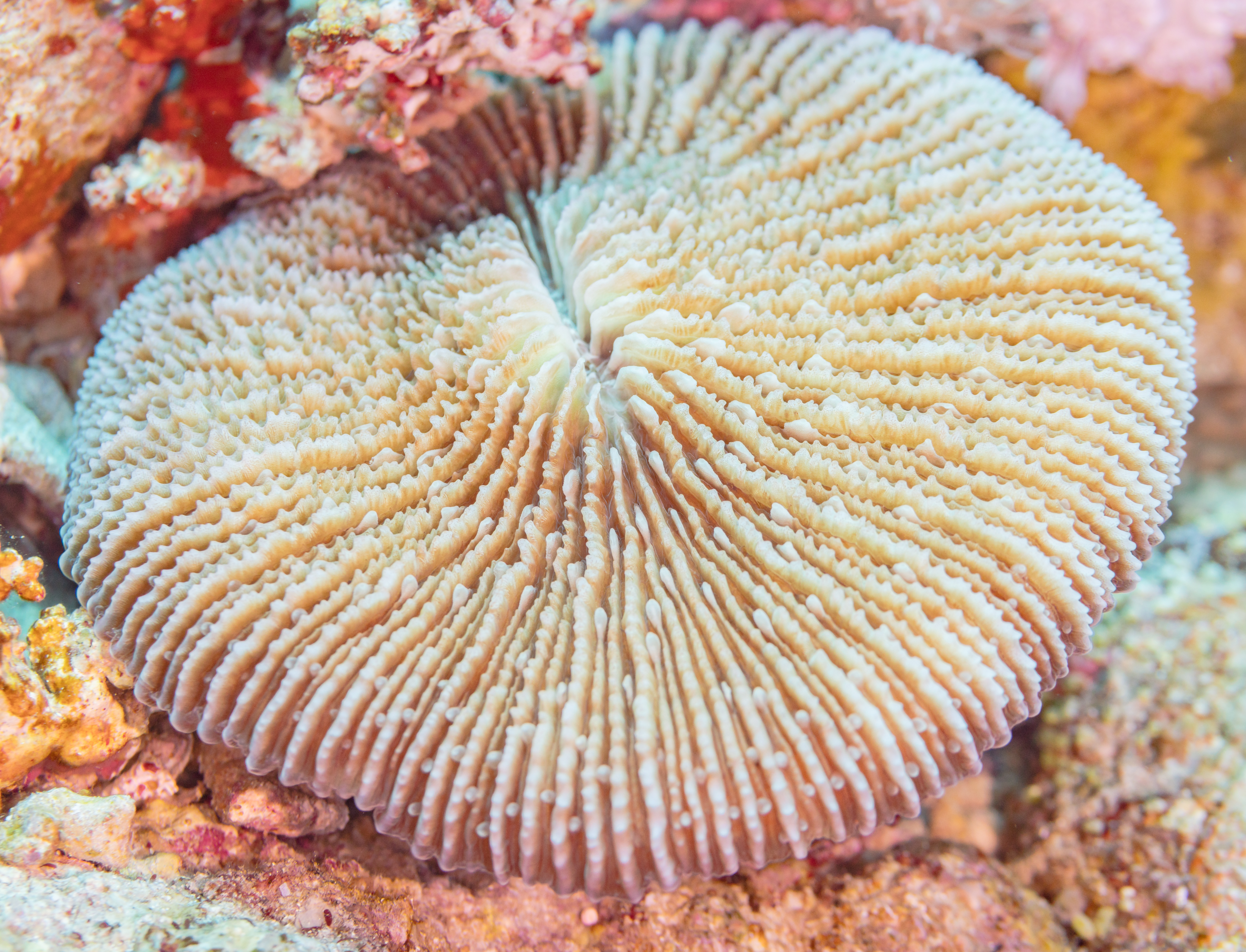
- Danafungia scruposa, Red Sea, Egypt

Conservation status
- Endangered (IUCN 3.1)

Scientific classification
- Kingdom: Animalia
- Phylum: Cnidaria
- Subphylum: Anthozoa
- Class: Hexacorallia
- Order: Scleractinia
- Family: Fungiidae
- Genus: Danafungia
- Species: D. scruposa

Binomial name
- Danafungia scruposa (Klunzinger, 1879)

Synonyms
- List: Fungia corona Döderlein, 1901; Fungia fieldi Gardiner, 1909; Fungia lobulata Ortmann, 1889; Fungia madagascarensis Vaughan, 1906; Fungia rugosa Quelch, 1886; Fungia scruposa Klunzinger, 1879; Fungia subrepanda Döderlein, 1901

= Danafungia scruposa =

Species of cnidarian

Danafungia scruposa is a species of coral that is the first to have been observed to eat jellyfish. It was described by Klunzinger in 1879 and has a diameter of around 25 centimetres (10 in). It is rated as a least-concern species.

== Description ==
They are about 25 centimetres (10 in) in diameter and normally eat a variety of food from bacteria to mesozooplankton measuring 1 mm in diameter. During an algal bloom in 2009 researchers observed the coral consuming the jellyfish Aurelia aurita. This was the first time such behaviour has been seen in the wild. It is not known how the coral captures jellyfish. It may have caught the jellyfish with its tentacles in the same way as some sea anemones feed on other jellyfish species.

This coral is unusual in that it consists of a single oval or circular polyp up to 38 centimetres (15 in) across. The species may contain tentacular lobes and it has dense septa. It is blue or brown in colour.

== Distribution ==
D. scruposa is found in the eastern and western Indian Ocean, the eastern central, northwestern and western central Pacific Ocean, Japan, the East China Sea, the Red Sea, and eastern Australia. No population figures are available for the species but it is believed to be common and is found at depths between 1 and 27 metres (3 and 89 ft) on the slopes of reefs. A 1991 study of specimens found that 51% were bleached. It is threatened by bleaching, disease, climate change, fishing, preadators, and human activities. F. scruposa is classified as a least concern species by the IUCN.

== Taxonomy ==
It was originally described by Carl Benjamin Klunzinger in 1879 as Fungia scruposa. The species is also known by synonym Fungia corona (Döderlein, 1901), among others.
