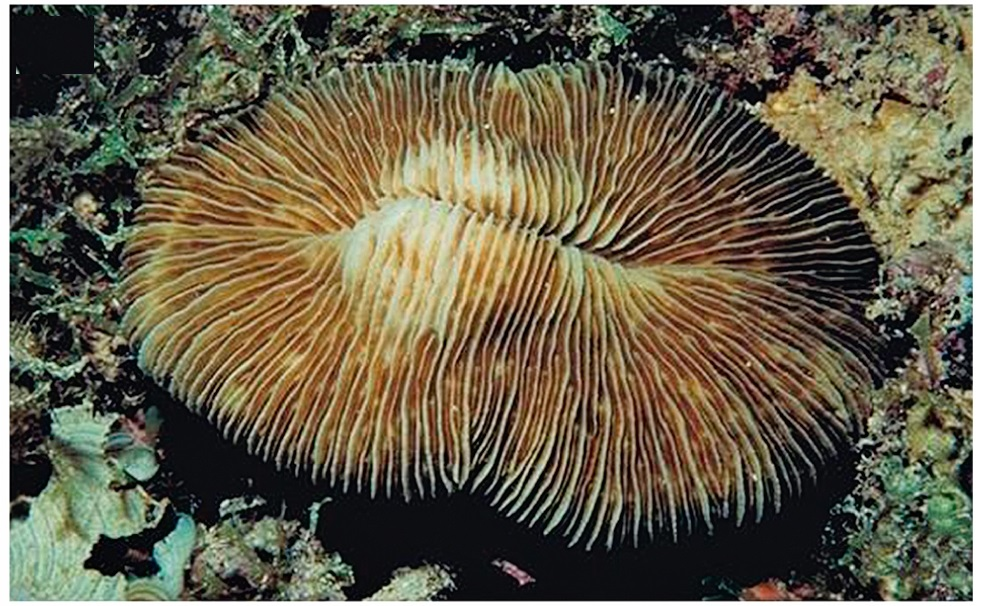
- Pleuractis

Scientific classification
- Kingdom: Animalia
- Phylum: Cnidaria
- Subphylum: Anthozoa
- Class: Hexacorallia
- Order: Scleractinia
- Family: Fungiidae
- Genus: Pleuractis; Verrill, 1864

Species
- See text

Synonyms
- Fungia (Pleuractis) Verrill, 1864; Fungia (Wellsofungia) Hoeksema, 1989

= Pleuractis =

Genus of corals

Pleuractis is a genus of mushroom corals in the family Fungiidae. Members of the genus are found growing on reefs in the Indo-Pacific.

== Taxonomy ==
Although treated as a subgenus of Fungia by Hoeksma (1989), a 2011 paper elevated Pleuractis to generic level.

== Species ==
The World Register of Marine Species currently lists the following species:

- Pleuractis alta (Nemenzo, 1983)
- Pleuractis granulosa (Klunzinger, 1879)
- Pleuractis gravis (Nemenzo, 1955)
- Pleuractis moluccensis (Van der Horst, 1919)
- Pleuractis paumotensis (Stutchbury, 1833)
- Pleuractis seychellensis (Hoeksema, 1993)
- Pleuractis taiwanensis (Hoeksema and Dai, 1991)
