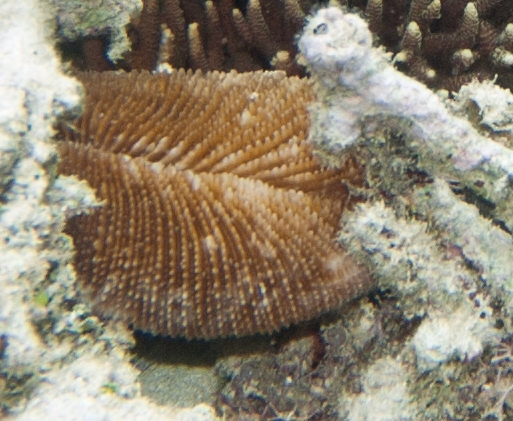
- Ctenactis echinata

Scientific classification
- Kingdom: Animalia
- Phylum: Cnidaria
- Subphylum: Anthozoa
- Class: Hexacorallia
- Order: Scleractinia
- Family: Fungiidae
- Genus: Ctenactis; Verrill, 1864

Species
- See text

= Ctenactis =

Genus of corals

Ctenactis is a genus of solitary disc corals in the family Fungiidae. Members of this genus are found in the Indo-Pacific region.

== Characteristics ==
Members of this genus are medium to large oval disc corals. They have an axial furrow with usually a single mouth opening, though sometimes there are several mouths. The septa are heavily toothed with sharp triangular teeth. The costae are weakly developed and have long arborescent spines.

== Species ==
The World Register of Marine Species currently lists the following species:

- Ctenactis albitentaculata Hoeksema, 1989
- Ctenactis crassa (Dana, 1846)
- Ctenactis echinata (Pallas, 1766)
