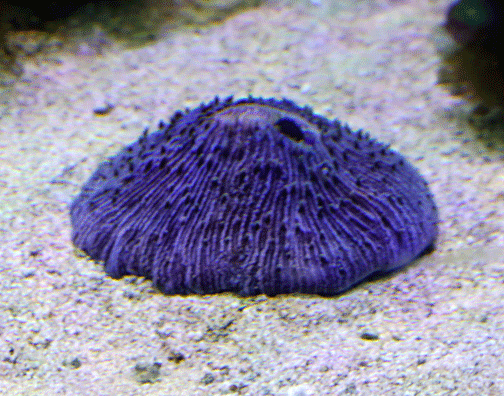
- Danafungia horrida in the National Park of American Samoa

Scientific classification
- Kingdom: Animalia
- Phylum: Cnidaria
- Subphylum: Anthozoa
- Class: Hexacorallia
- Order: Scleractinia
- Family: Fungiidae
- Genus: Danafungia; Wells, 1966

Species
- See text

Synonyms
- Fungia (Danafungia) Wells, 1966

= Danafungia =

Genus of cnidarians

Danafungia is a genus of mushroom corals in the family Fungiidae. Members of the genus are found growing on reefs in the Indo-Pacific.

== Species ==
The World Register of Marine Species currently lists the following species:

- Danafungia horrida (Dana, 1846)
- Danafungia scruposa (Klunzinger, 1879)
