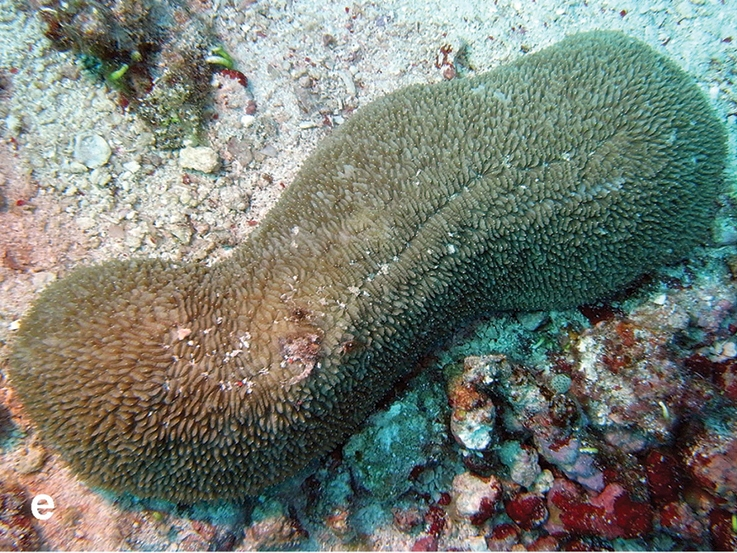
- Polyphyllia talpina

Scientific classification
- Domain: Eukaryota
- Kingdom: Animalia
- Phylum: Cnidaria
- Subphylum: Anthozoa
- Class: Hexacorallia
- Order: Scleractinia
- Family: Fungiidae
- Genus: Polyphyllia; Blainville, 1830

= Polyphyllia =

Genus of cnidarians

Polyphyllia is a genus of cnidarians belonging to the family Fungiidae.

The species of this genus are found in Indian and Pacific Ocean.

Species:

- Polyphyllia novaehiberniae (Lesson, 1831)
- Polyphyllia talpina (Lamarck, 1801)
