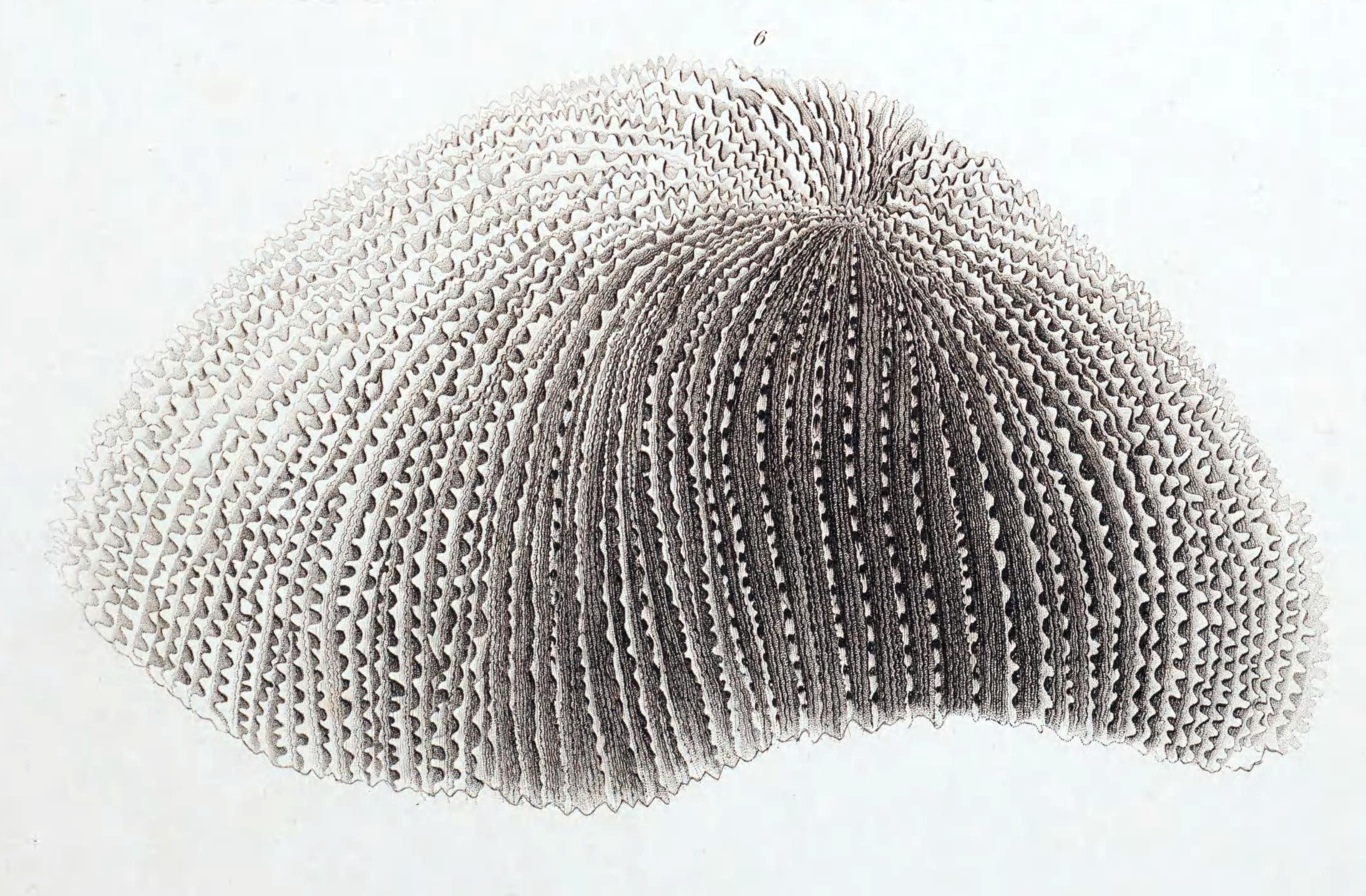
- Zoopilus echinatus

Conservation status
- Least Concern (IUCN 3.1)

Scientific classification
- Kingdom: Animalia
- Phylum: Cnidaria
- Subphylum: Anthozoa
- Class: Hexacorallia
- Order: Scleractinia
- Family: Fungiidae
- Genus: Zoopilus; Dana, 1846
- Species: Z. echinatus

Binomial name
- Zoopilus echinatus Dana, 1846

= Zoopilus =

Genus of corals

Zoopilus is a monotypic genus of cnidarians belonging to the family Fungiidae. The only species is Zoopilus echinatus.
