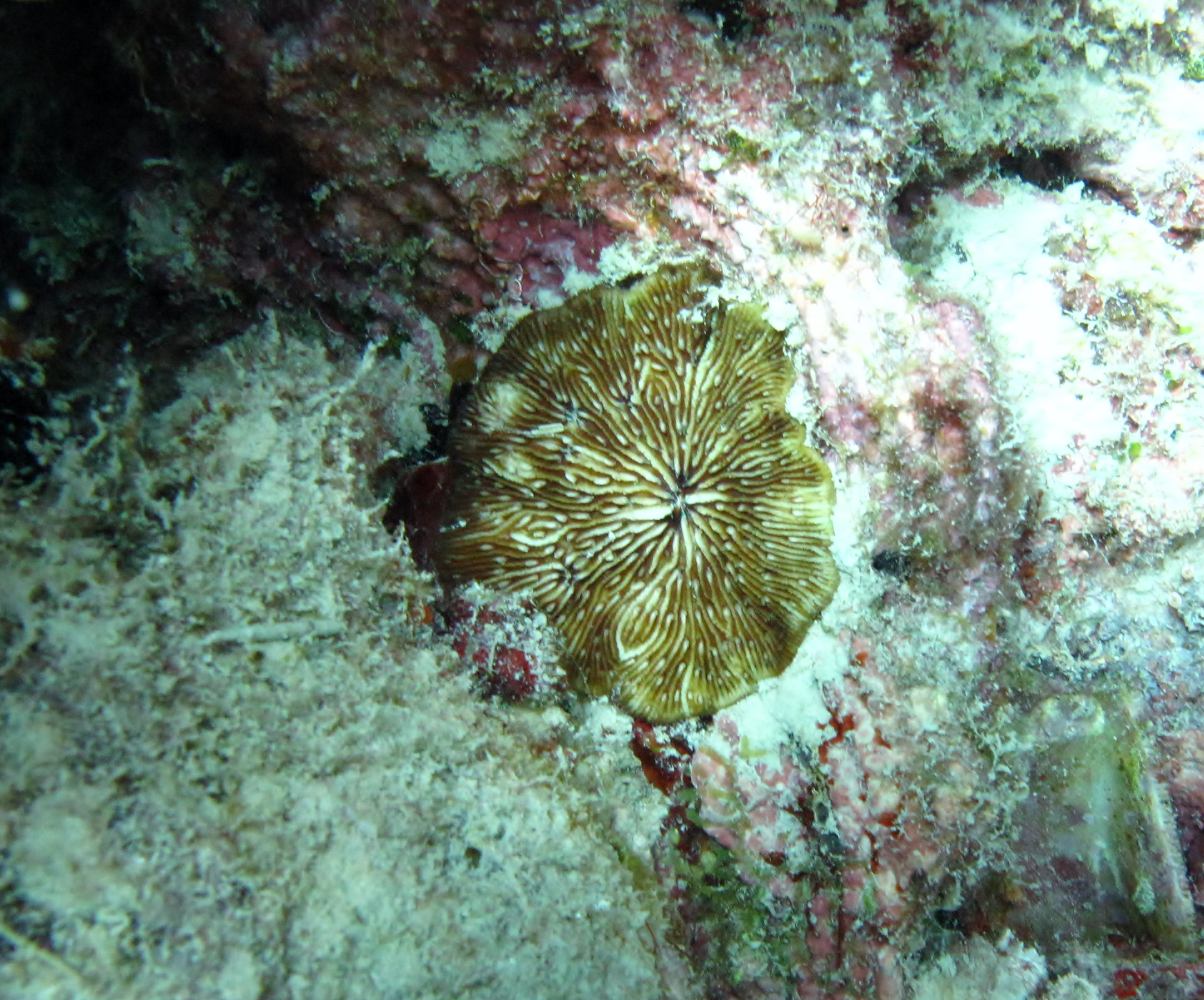
- Cantharellus jebbi

Scientific classification
- Domain: Eukaryota
- Kingdom: Animalia
- Phylum: Cnidaria
- Class: Hexacorallia
- Order: Scleractinia
- Family: Fungiidae
- Genus: Cantharellus; Hoeksema & Best, 1984

Type species
- Cantharellus noumeae Hoeksema & Best, 1984

= Cantharellus (coral) =

Genus of corals

Cantharellus is a genus of corals within the family Fungiidae.

== Species ==
- Cantharellus doederleini (von Marenzeller, 1907)
- Cantharellus jebbi Hoeksema, 1993
- Cantharellus noumeae Hoeksema & Best, 1984
