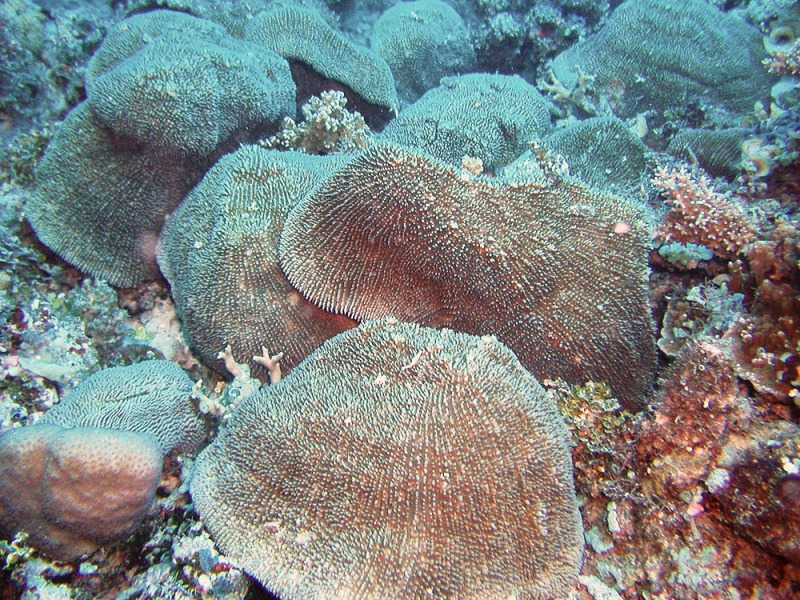
- Halomitra pileus in its natural habitat (Anne Hoggett, 2003).

Scientific classification
- Kingdom: Animalia
- Phylum: Cnidaria
- Subphylum: Anthozoa
- Class: Hexacorallia
- Order: Scleractinia
- Family: Fungiidae
- Genus: Halomitra; Dana, 1846

Type species
- Halomitra pileus (Linnaeus, 1758)

Species
- Halomitra pileus (Linnaeus, 1758); Halomitra clavator Hoeksema, 1989; Halomitra meierae Veron & Maragos, 2000

= Halomitra =

Genus of stony corals

Halomitra is a genus of stony corals within the family Fungiidae, commonly known as mushroom corals. Unlike many reef-building corals that are fixed and colonial, Halomitra species are typically solitary and free-living, meaning they are not permanently attached to the reef substrate. Instead, they rest on sandy or rubble seabeds and exhibit limited movement. This makes them particularly well adapted to unstable reef environments such as lagoon floors and sediment-rich reef flats. The most well-known species, Halomitra pileus, is notable for its relatively large size and dome-like shape, often resembling a bowl or mushroom cap. They are most commonly found in regions with warm, clear waters that support coral reef development.

== Taxonomy ==
The genus Halomitra was first described by James Dwight Dana in 1846. It belongs to the family Fungiidae, which consists of solitary, free-living corals. As of now, the genus Halomitra records 3 recognised species.

- Halomitra pileus (Linnaeus, 1758)
  - Halomitra philippinensis (Studer, 1901) is accepted as a junior synonym of Halomitra pileus.
- Halomitra clavator Hoeksema, 1989
- Halomitra meierae Veron and Maragos, 2000

The type species of Halomitra is Halomitra pileus.

Studying Fungiidae (its family) is particularly important because it bridges structural traits between different coral genuses. Unique skeletal features within Fungiidae, like synapticula, helped scientists refine coral classification systems that better identify Halomitra corals.

== Description ==
The coral has a disc-like or dome-shaped skeleton called corallum. It is typically circular or slightly oval, with a central mouth and radiating skeletal ridges extending outward. This flattened shape reflects an evolutionary adaptation toward horizontal growth, which is characteristic of Fungiid corals. Observations of coralla within species of Halomitra have revealed unusual growth structures in some specimens. In particular, some individuals exhibit an "unconformable nucleus", where a new corallum appears to develop over a fragment of a previous coral skeleton.

This structure results in discontinuities between inner and outer skeletal rings, suggesting that growth may occur around remnants of earlier individuals rather than from a single continuous developmental origin. The upper surface is covered with septa, which are thin, blade-like skeletal structures radiating from the centre. These septa are arranged in alternating sizes, often have serrated or spiny edges and help support the soft coral tissue and increase surface area. Another important structural feature is the presence of synapticula. They are small horizontal skeletal bars that connect adjacent septa. According to classical coral studies, these structures partially bridge the gaps between septa, reinforce the coral's skeleton and create a semi-connected internal framework rather than open gaps. This feature is critical for classification, because it distinguishes Fungiid corals from other coral families. The underside of Halomitra has a convex and smooth shape. The shape helps the coral remain stable on loose substrates and reduces sinking into sand. The shape may also assist slight repositioning through water movement or tissue expansion.

== Habitat ==
Halomitra species typically inhabit sandy or rubble substrates in shallow reef environments, usually at depths ranging from 1 to 30 metres.

== Ecology ==
Halomitra species are both autotrophic and heterotrophic, meaning two complementary ways of obtaining energy. Like most coral species, Halomitra corals host symbiotic zooxanthellae, an algae species inside its tissues. The algae performs photosynthesis to produce sugars that feed the coral. In this way, Halomitra corals contribute to reef ecosystems by stabilising substrates and providing microhabitats for small marine organisms. This would mean that Halomitra corals tend to be found in shallow waters to access adequate sunlight. Halomitra corals ability to move slowly across substrates and potentially fragment enhances their resilience in environments with shifting sediments. They can capture plankton using tentacles and trap organic particles using mucus. This dual strategy makes it highly adaptable, especially in environments where light or nutrients fluctuate.

Because of its morphological characteristics, Halomitra corals are very resilient in the open water. Unlike attached corals, Halomitra corals do not rely on hard substrate. This allows it to survive in sandy or shifting environments and avoid competition for space. Its smooth, curved shape helps to shed sediment easily and prevent smothering. Although limited, Halomitra corals can inflate and deflate tissue, as well as slightly reposition itself to avoid burial or unfavourable conditions. The combination of septa and synapticula provides strength against breakage and flexibility under stress.

== Distribution ==
Species of Halomitra are distributed throughout the tropical Indo-Pacific region. They tend to be found across:

- Southeast Asia (Indonesia, Philippines, Malaysia)
- Northern Australia (Great Barrier Reef)
- The Red Sea and western Indian Ocean
- Central Pacific Islands

== Reproduction and growth ==
Like many other coral species, Halomitra is capable of sexual reproduction. However, there are theories that explain that Halomitra corals undergo asexual reproduction too.

Halomitra corals reproduce sexually through broadcast spawning. Eggs and sperm are released into the water. Fertilisation occurs externally. Larvae (planulae) drift before settling onto the ocean bed.

Halomitra corals are theorised to reproduce asexually through fragmentation, where broken pieces recover damaged tissues and regrow into new individuals. The repeated occurrence of fragment-based nuclei in multiple specimens has led to the hypothesis that Halomitra may undergo spontaneous fission during adulthood. Such a process may be adaptive. As free-living corals increase in size, mobility may become constrained. Division of the Halomitra coral into smaller units could restore mobility and improve survival in dynamic reef environments. This hypothesis is consistent with broader patterns observed in the family Fungiidae, where juvenile corals may detach from parent individuals through the resorption of connecting skeletal structures, resulting in independent, free-living forms.

== Conservation status ==
The genus Halomitra itself is not typically assessed as a whole by the International Union for Conservation of Nature (IUCN). Instead, conservation status is evaluated at the species level.

For example, the dominant species, Halomitra pileus, known as the bowl coral, while decreasing, is listed as Least Concern (LC) on the IUCN Red List. This classification reflects its wide distribution across the Indo-Pacific, relatively stable population trends and ability to tolerate sedimented and dynamic environments. However, this does not mean it is free from risk. Like most reef-building corals, it remains vulnerable to large-scale environmental change.

== Environmental threats ==
Climate change and coral bleaching: The most significant threat to Halomitra corals is rising sea temperatures associated with global climate change. Elevated temperatures disrupt the coral–zooxanthellae symbiosis. Corals expel their symbiotic algae, resulting in coral bleaching. Prolonged bleaching leads to starvation and death.

Increasing atmospheric CO₂ leads to lower ocean pH, which affects coral calcification. This reduces the availability of carbonate ions, slows skeletal growth and weakens the structural integrity of the corallum.

Although Halomitra corals are more tolerant of sediment than many corals, excessive sedimentation still poses risks. Coastal construction, land reclamation, deforestation and runoff are multiple sources.

Halomitra corals are vulnerable to storm damage, anchor dragging and destructive fishing practices.

Declining reef ecosystems decreases habitat quality, disrupts symbiotic relationships with associated invertebrate and increase competition of living space with algae.

== Study methodology ==
Field studies of Halomitra are typically conducted through scuba diving, allowing researchers to document coral species across varying reef depths and habitats.

Modern studies generally favour non-destructive methods, relying on photographic records and comparison with taxonomic references rather than specimen collection. Observations are usually made with photographic documentation of both the oral surface and underside of corals for identification and morphological analysis.

Research on Halomitra often includes the study of associated fauna, such as fishes, crustaceans, and other cryptobenthic organisms, which may inhabit coral surfaces or skeletons. These ecological surveys may record species abundance, habitat use, and symbiotic relationships, contributing to broader understanding of reef biodiversity. Environmental parameters, including water depth, temperature, and substrate type, are frequently recorded during surveys to assess habitat preferences and distribution patterns.

Observational studies: Researchers observe and document feeding behaviour in mushroom corals, including the capture and ingestion of relatively large prey such as salps. These findings demonstrate that Fungiid corals, including Halomitra, are active heterotrophs capable of capturing planktonic organisms using tentacles and transporting them to the mouth for digestion.
