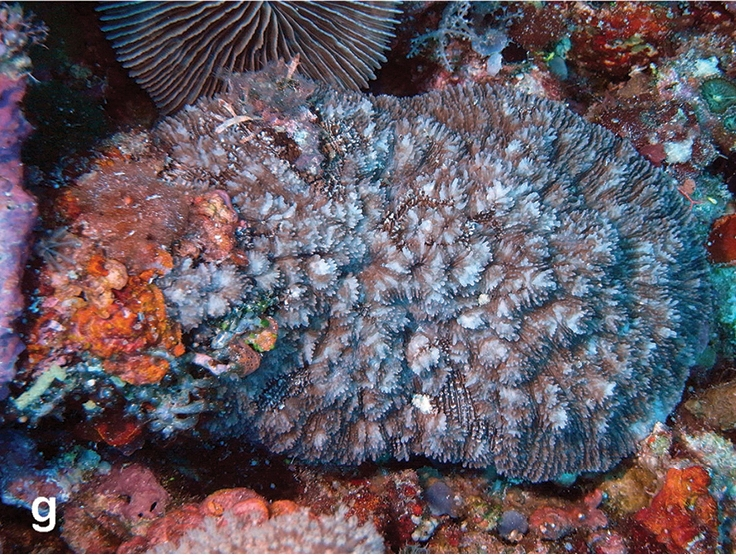
- Sandalolitha dentata

Scientific classification
- Domain: Eukaryota
- Kingdom: Animalia
- Phylum: Cnidaria
- Subphylum: Anthozoa
- Class: Hexacorallia
- Order: Scleractinia
- Family: Fungiidae
- Genus: Sandalolitha; Quelch, 1884

= Sandalolitha =

Genus of corals

Sandalolitha is a genus of cnidarians belonging to the family Fungiidae.

The species of this genus are found in Indian Ocean, Malesia and Pacific Ocean.

Species:

- Sandalolitha boucheti Hoeksema, 2012
- Sandalolitha dentata Quelch, 1884
- Sandalolitha robusta (Quelch, 1886)
