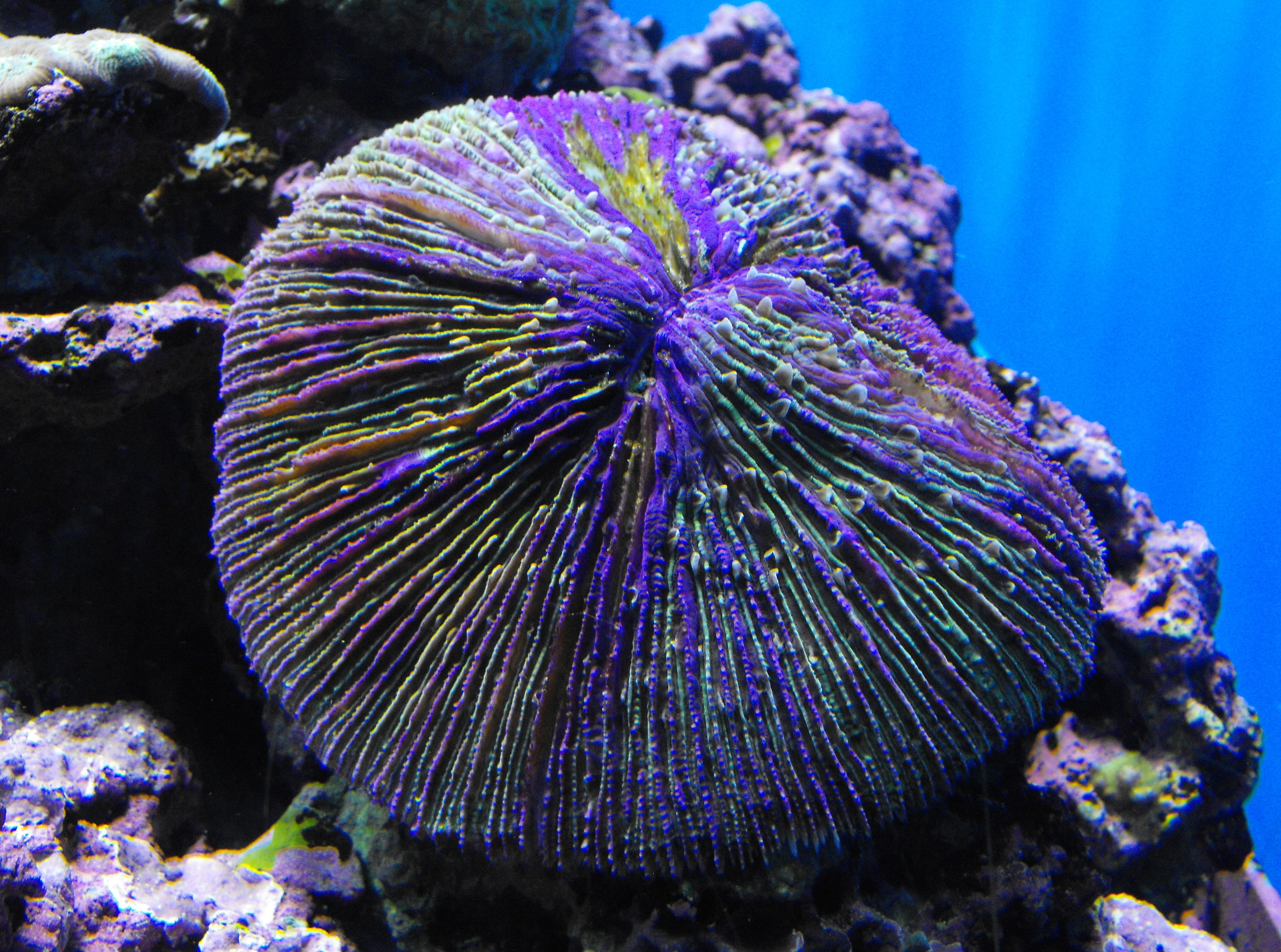

Conservation status
- Least Concern (IUCN 3.1)

Scientific classification
- Kingdom: Animalia
- Phylum: Cnidaria
- Subphylum: Anthozoa
- Class: Hexacorallia
- Order: Scleractinia
- Family: Fungiidae
- Genus: Fungia; Lamarck, 1801
- Species: F. fungites

Binomial name
- Fungia fungites (Linnaeus, 1758)

Synonyms
- List (Genus): Fungia (Fungia) Lamarck, 1801; (Species): Fungia agariciformis Lamarck, 1801; Fungia confertifolia Dana, 1846; Fungia crassilamellata Milne Edwards & Haime, 1860; Fungia crassolamellata Milne Edwards & Haime, 1851; Fungia dentata Dana, 1846; Fungia haemei Verrill, 1864; Fungia papillosa Verrill, 1866; Fungia patella Ellis & Solander, 1786; Fungia pliculosa Studer, 1878; Fungia puishani Veron & DeVantier, 2000; Halomitra fungites Studer, 1901; Madrepora fungites Linnaeus, 1758

= Fungia =

Fungia fungites

Genus of corals

Fungia is a genus of corals in the family Fungiidae. It is monotypic with the single species Fungia fungites, which is found growing on reefs in the Indo-Pacific.

== Taxonomy ==
Until 2015, the genus Fungia had more than 30 species, but based on recent studies it has now been reduced to a single species.

== Description ==
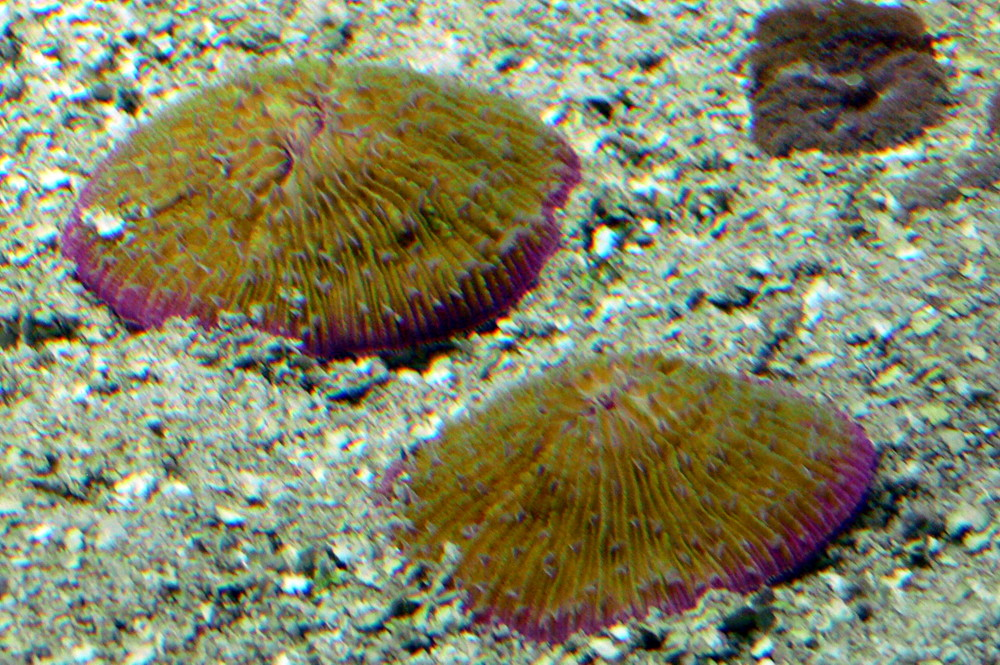
Fungia sp.

Corals of Fungia fungites are mostly solitary, some attaining 30 centimetres (12 in) in diameter. The juveniles attach themselves to rock but larger individuals detach themselves and become free living. They are found in various bright colours including white, pink, red, purple, blue and yellow and are popular with keepers of reef aquariums. The discs are either round or oval and the central mouth, which is surrounded by tentacles, may be a slit. The polyp sits in a calcareous cup, the corallite. The septa are vertical skeletal elements inside the corallite wall and the costae join the septae and continue outside the corallite wall and underneath the coral. Both the septae and costae are robust. Fungia fungites may be confused with specimens of the related genus Cycloseris but the latter are always free living, even as juveniles, while the former bear a scar showing where they were attached when young. Fungia corals, like other large polyp stony corals, have developed several feeding strategies. They also capture planktonic organisms, food particles from the water column, and can absorb dissolved organic matter. Feeding tentacles are usually visible at night. Fungia also reproduce asexually. Daughter colonies / polyps may form and they will form offspring from broken pieces. they show regeneration.

== Gallery ==
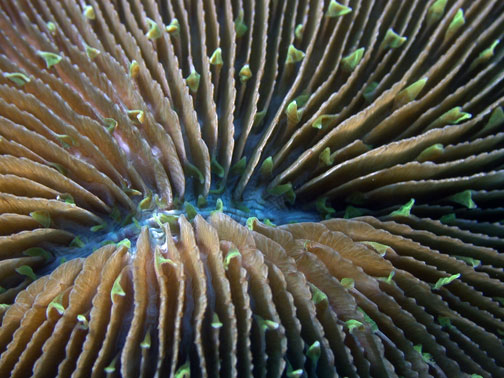

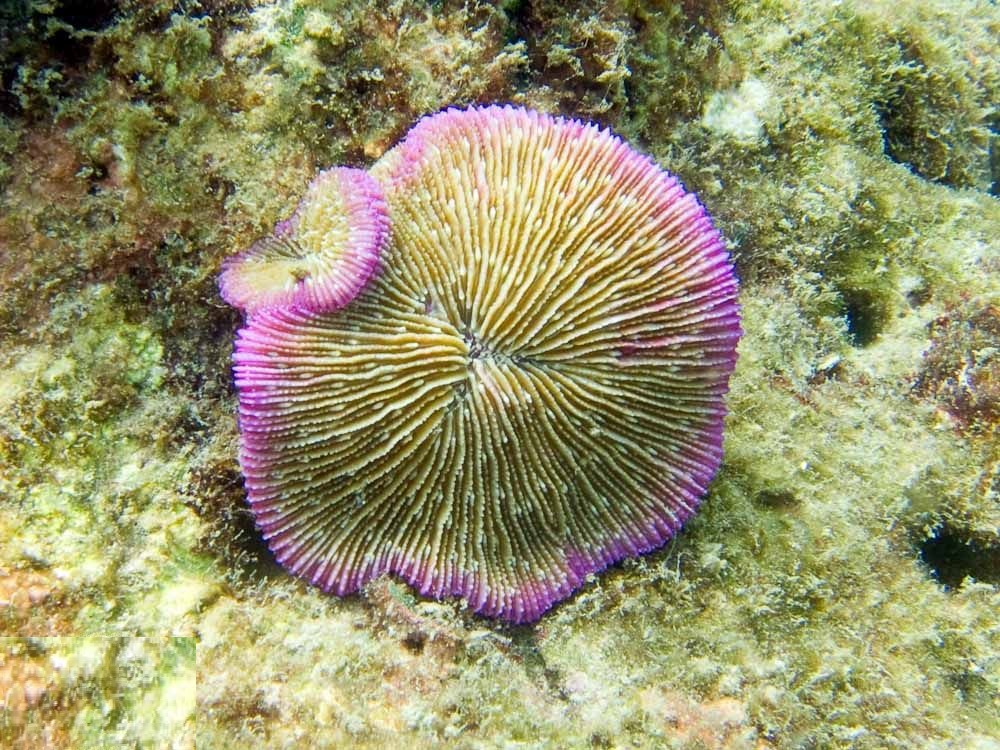

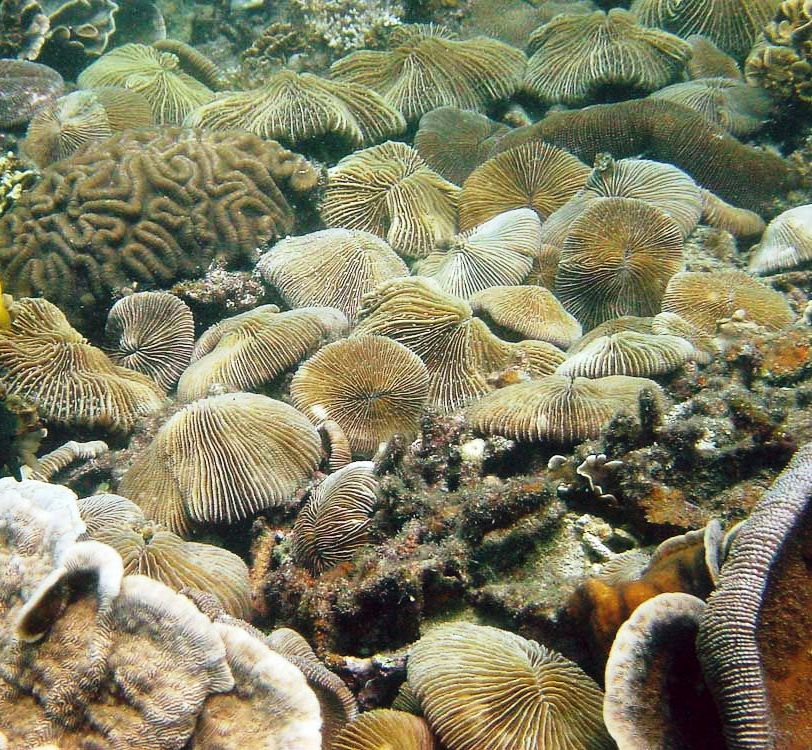

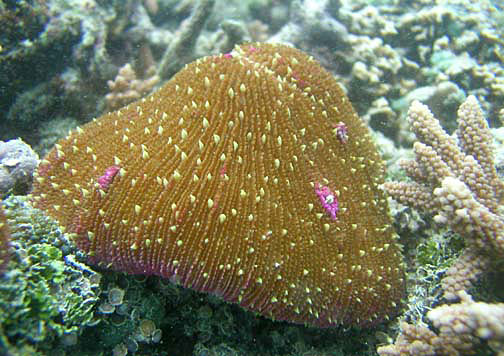

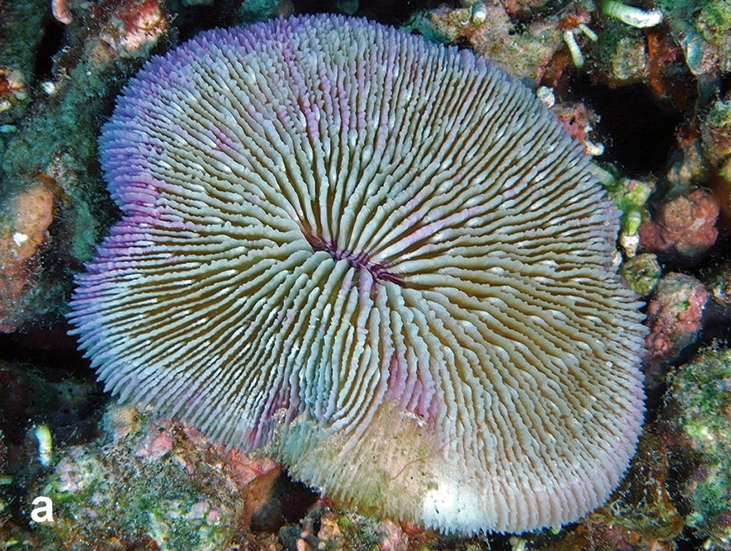

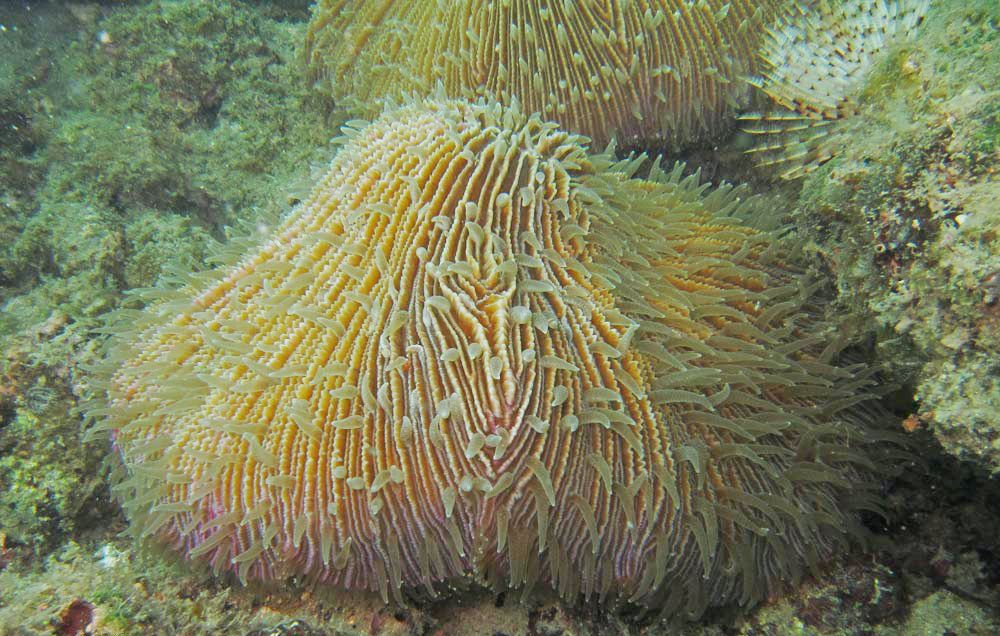
