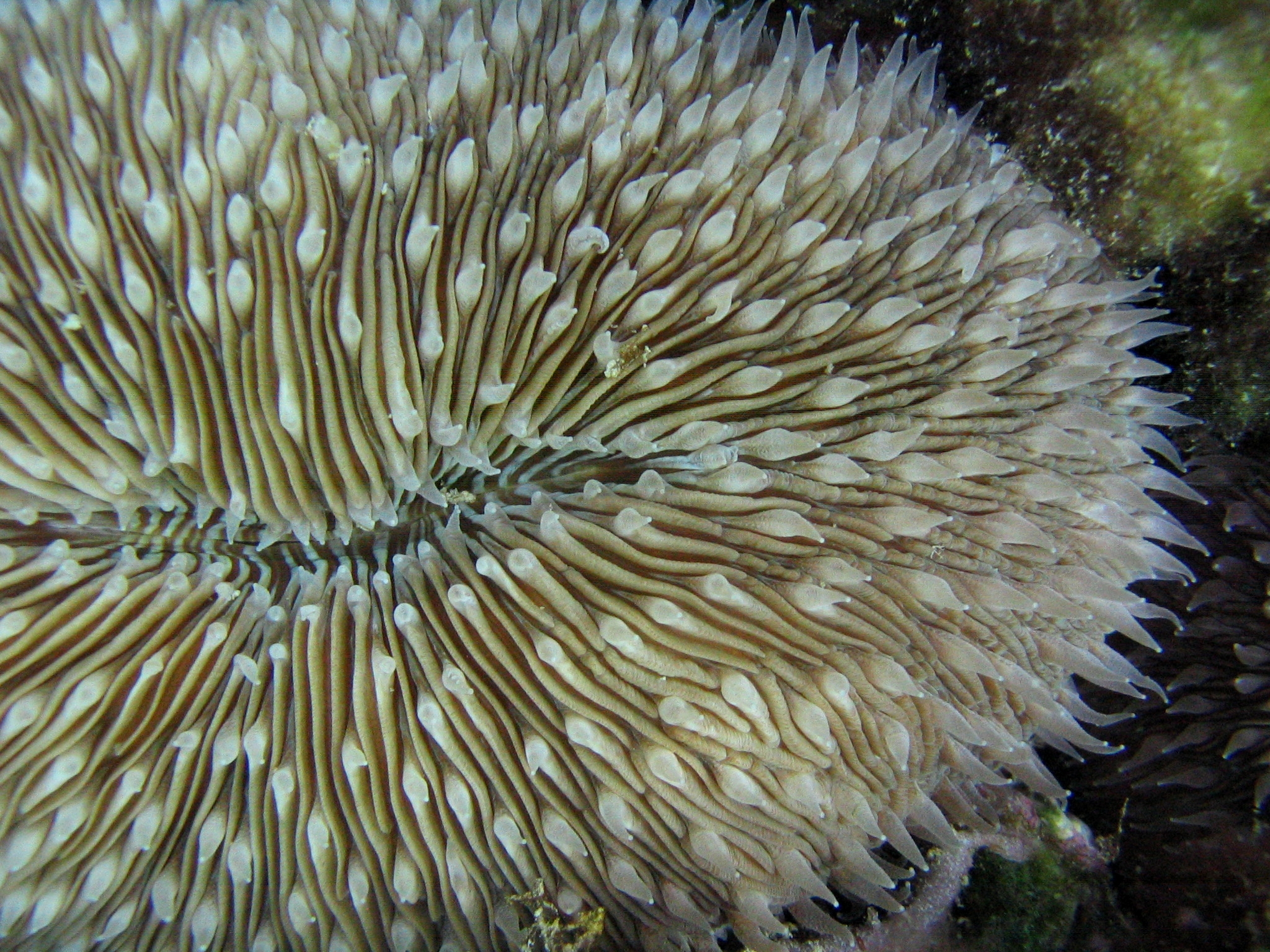
- Fungia scutaria

Scientific classification
- Kingdom: Animalia
- Phylum: Cnidaria
- Subphylum: Anthozoa
- Class: Hexacorallia
- Order: Scleractinia
- Suborder: Fungiina
- Family: Fungiidae; Dana, 1846

Genera
- See text

= Fungiidae =

Family of corals

The Fungiidae (/fəŋˈɡiːɪdi/) are a family of Cnidaria, commonly known as mushroom corals or plate corals. The family contains thirteen extant genera. They range from solitary corals to colonial species. Some genera such as Cycloseris and Fungia are solitary organisms, Polyphyllia consists of a single organism with multiple mouths, and Ctenactis and Herpolitha might be considered as solitary organisms with multiple mouths or a colony of individuals, each with its separate mouth.

== Characteristics ==
Species are generally solitary marine animals capable of benthic locomotion. These corals often appear to be bleached or dead. In most genera, a single polyp emerges from the center of the skeleton to feed at night. Most species remain fully detached from the substrate in adulthood. Some are immobile as well as colonial.

== Ecology ==
Some species of mushroom coral such as Fungia repanda and Ctenactis echinata are able to change sex. This is posited to take place in response to environmental or energetic constraints, and to improve the organism's evolutionary fitness; similar phenomena are observed in some dioecious plants.

== Genera ==
The World Register of Marine Species includes these genera in the family:

- Cantharellus Hoeksema & Best, 1984
- Ctenactis Verrill, 1864
- Cycloseris Milne Edwards & Haime, 1849
- Danafungia Wells, 1966
- Fungia Lamarck, 1801
- Halomitra Dana, 1846
- Heliofungia Wells, 1966
- Herpolitha Eschscholtz, 1825
- Lithophyllon Rehberg, 1892
- Lobactis Verrill, 1864
- Pleuractis Verrill, 1864
- Podabacia Milne Edwards & Haime, 1849
- Polyphyllia Blainville, 1830
- Sandalolitha Quelch, 1884
- Sinuorota Oku, Naruse & Fukami, 2017
- Zoopilus Dana, 1846

=== Notable species ===
- One fungiid species, Heliofungia actiniformis ("anemone coral"), can be easily mistaken for a sea anemone [actiniarian] because its tentacles remain visible during the day. They also provide shelter to some fish species (Gobiidae and Labridae).
- Fungia spp. have a commensal pipefish, Siokunichthys nigrolineatus.
- Some fungiids can be elongated and look like a sea cucumber (stichopodid).
- Some fungiids (Danafungia scruposa) have been observed eating jellyfish.

== Importance to humans ==
Members of the family Fungiidae are not of any commercial importance, but are collected for the aquarium trade and are sold as "plate corals".

== See also ==
- Coral fungus
- Mussidae

== Gallery ==
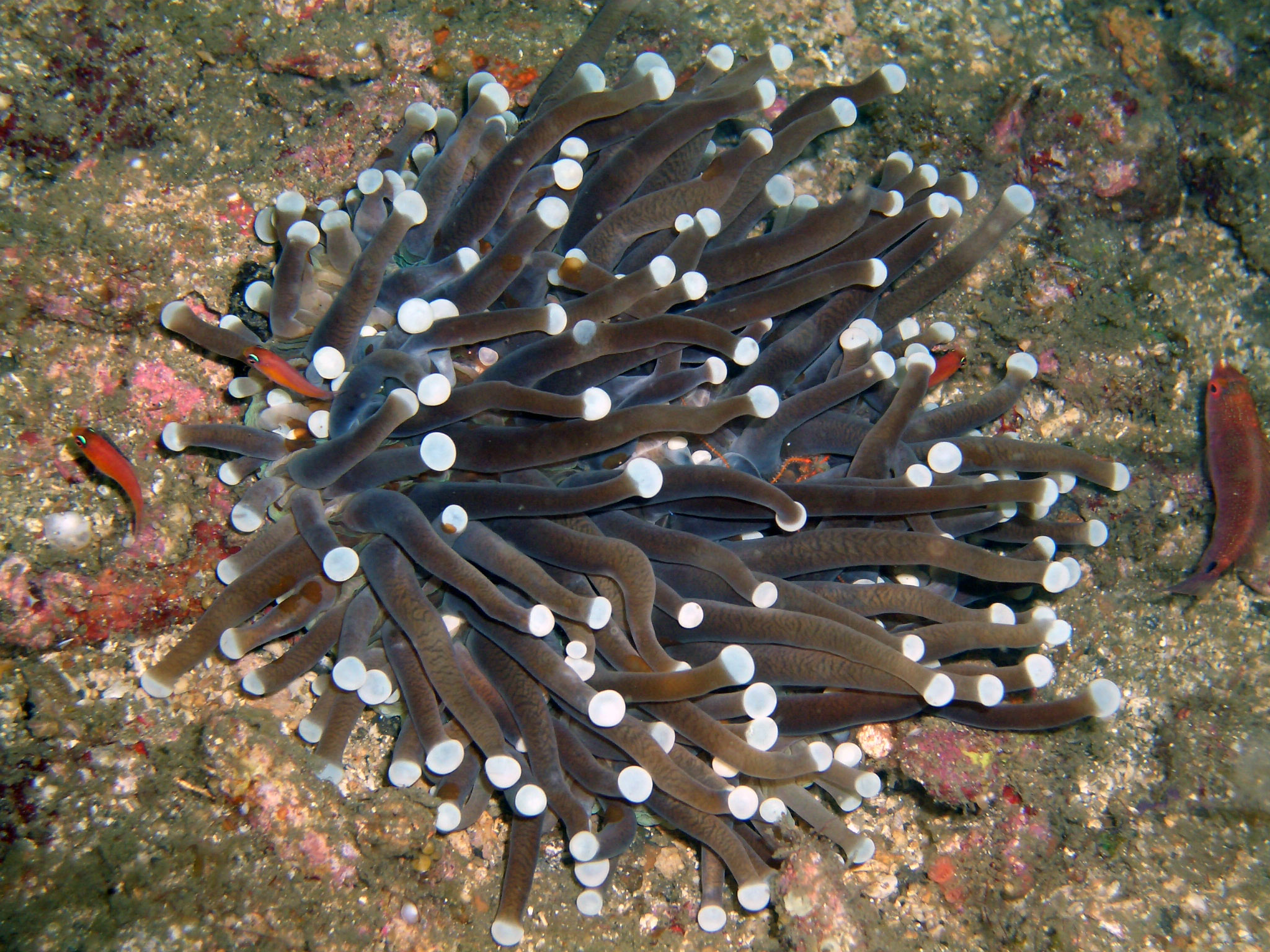
Heliofungia sp. looks similar to a sea anemone.

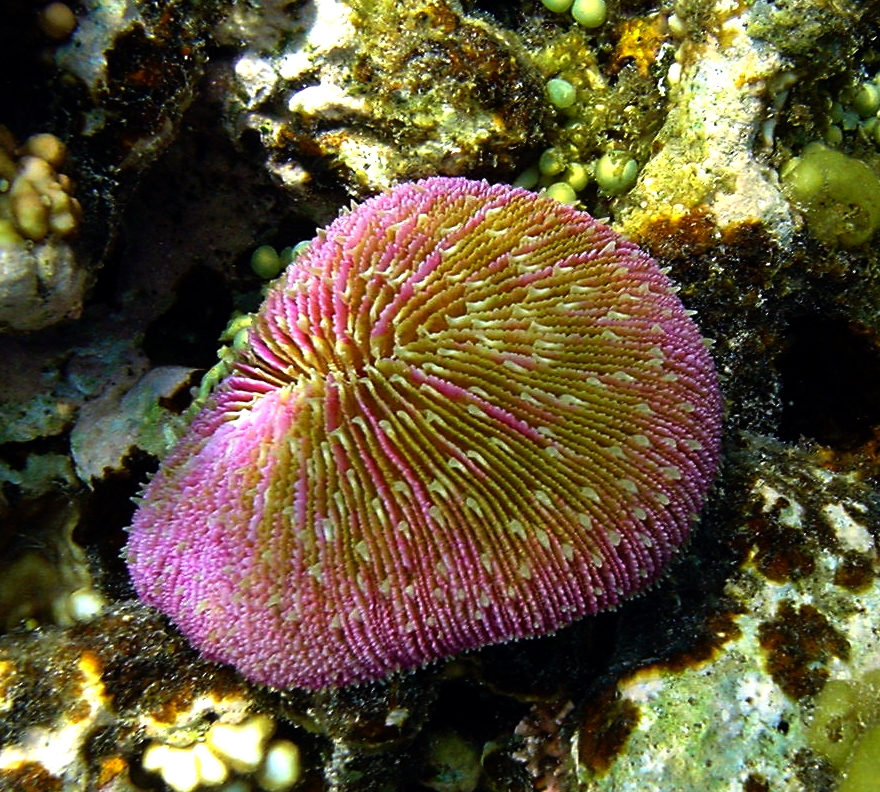
Fungia sp. in Papua New Guinea

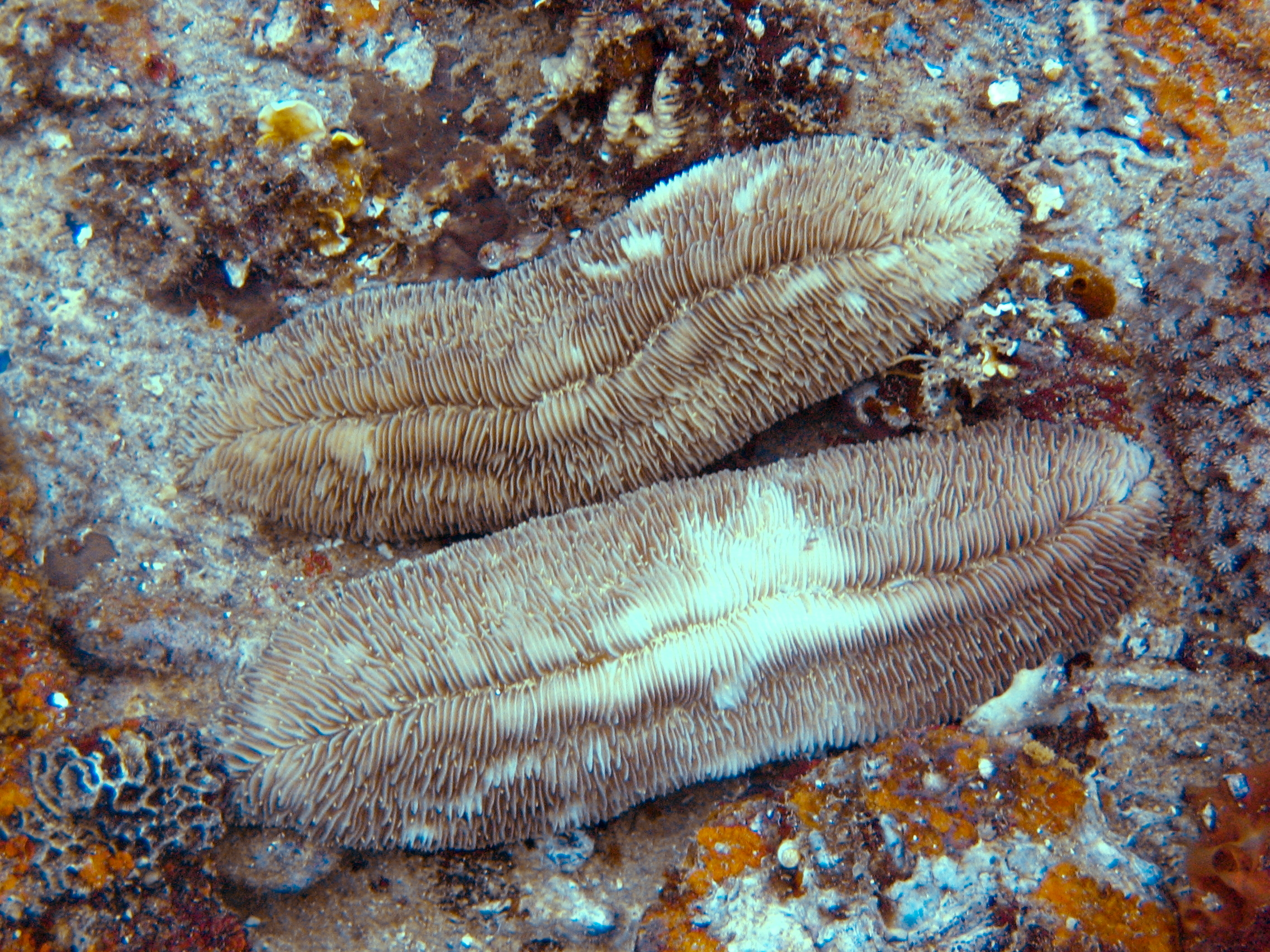
Herpolitha limax in Micronesia can appear bleached and also resemble a sea cucumber.

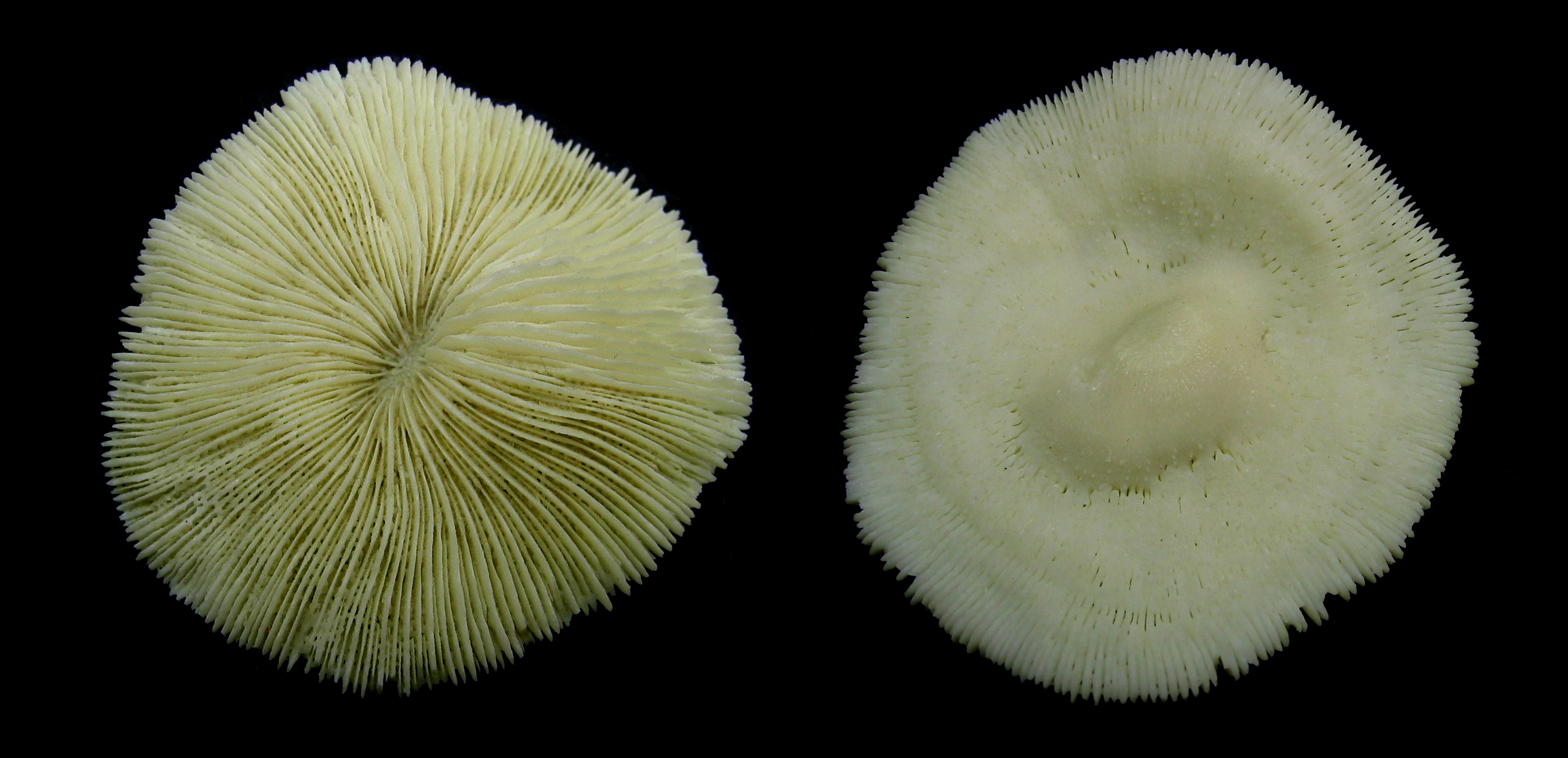
Fungia sp.
