= Costa (coral) =

In corals, a costa (plural costae) is one of the vertical plates lying outside the corallite wall, a continuation of a septum (plural septa) which lies inside the wall. The costae may continue to the edge of the colony and in solitary species, such as those in the family Fungiidae, refers to the ridges on the underside of the coral.
