= Septum (coral) =

Stony ridges forming part of the corallites of corals

In corals, a septum (plural septa) is one of the radiating vertical plates lying within the corallite wall. Outside the corallite wall these plates are known as costae (singular costa). The septa may be thick, thin or vary in size. They may have teeth which range from needle-like to blade-like and are often characteristic of different genera.
