= List of least concern invertebrates =

- Extinct in the wild (EW): 2 species
- Critically endangered (CR): 853 species
- Endangered (EN): 1,533 species
- Vulnerable (VU): 1,578 species
- Near threatened (NT, LR/cd): 1,119 species
- Least concern (LC): 8,632 species
- Data deficient (DD): 4,644 species
Invertebrate species (IUCN, 2025.2)
- 18,442 extant species have been evaluated
- 13,798 of those are fully assessed (Note: excludes data deficient evaluations.)
- 9,751 are not threatened at present
- 4,047 to 8,691 are threatened (Note: Threatened comprises CR, EN and VU. Upper estimate additionally includes DD.)
- 83 to 255 are extinct or extinct in the wild:
  - 81 extinct (EX) species (Note: Chart omits extinct (EX) species)
  - 2 extinct in the wild (EW)
  - 171 possibly extinct [CR(PE)]
  - 1 possibly extinct in the wild [CR(PEW)]

As of July 2016, the International Union for Conservation of Nature (IUCN) lists 6919 least concern invertebrate species. 38% of all evaluated invertebrate species are listed as least concern. The IUCN also lists 32 invertebrate subspecies as least concern.

No subpopulations of invertebrates have been evaluated by the IUCN.

This is a complete list of least concern invertebrate species and subspecies as evaluated by the IUCN.

== Nemertea ==
- Argonemertes hillii

== Molluscs ==
There are 2437 mollusc species and five mollusc subspecies assessed as least concern.

== Cnidaria ==
There are 301 species in the phylum Cnidaria assessed as least concern.

=== Hydrozoa ===
- Millepora alcicornis
- Millepora complanata
- Net fire coral (Millepora dichotoma)
- Millepora exaesa
- Millepora intricata
- Firecoral (Millepora platyphylla)
- Millepora squarrosa
- Millepora tenera

=== Anthozoa ===
There are 293 species in the class Anthozoa assessed as least concern.

==== Actiniaria ====
- Golden anemone (Condylactis aurantiaca)
- Fat anemone (Cribrinopsis crassa)

==== Alcyonacea ====
- Clavularia crassa

==== Scleractinia ====
There are 290 species in the order Scleractinia assessed as least concern.

===== Dendrophylliids =====
- Tooth coral (Balanophyllia europaea)
- Heteropsammia cochlea
- Turbinaria conspicua
- Turbinaria frondens
- Turbinaria irregularis

===== Acroporids =====
- Acropora abrotanoides
- Acropora bushyensis
- Acropora cerealis
- Acropora chesterfieldensis
- Acropora clathrata
- Acropora cytherea
- Acropora downingi
- Acropora elseyi
- Acropora gemmifera
- Acropora grandis
- Acropora latistella
- Acropora longicyathus
- Acropora microphthalma
- Acropora pulchra
- Acropora robusta
- Acropora samoensis
- Acropora sarmentosa
- Acropora spathulata
- Acropora squarrosa
- Acropora subglabra
- Acropora subulata
- Acropora tortuosa
- Acropora valenciennesi
- Acropora valida
- Acropora variolosa
- Acropora yongei
- Anacropora forbesi
- Astreopora gracilis
- Astreopora listeri
- Astreopora myriophthalma
- Astreopora ocellata
- Astreopora randalli
- Astreopora scabra
- Astreopora suggesta
- Montipora aequituberculata
- Montipora circumvallata
- Montipora danae
- Montipora digitata
- Montipora floweri
- Montipora grisea
- Montipora hispida
- Montipora hoffmeisteri
- Montipora informis
- Montipora millepora
- Montipora mollis
- Montipora monasteriata
- Montipora spongiosa
- Montipora spongodes
- Montipora spumosa
- Montipora stellata
- Montipora tuberculosa
- Montipora turgescens
- Montipora verrucosa

===== Oculinids =====
- Galaxea horrescens
- Diffuse ivory bush coral (Oculina diffusa)
- Oculina patagonica

===== Meandrinids =====
- Smooth flower coral (Eusmilia fastigiata)
- Gyrosmilia interrupta
- Meandrina danae
- Maze coral (Meandrina meandrites)

===== Poritids =====
- Alveopora tizardi
- Goniopora ciliatus
- Goniopora djiboutiensis
- Goniopora eclipsensis
- Goniopora fruticosa
- Goniopora norfolkensis
- Goniopora palmensis
- Goniopora pandoraensis
- Goniopora pearsoni
- Goniopora pendulus
- Goniopora savignyi
- Goniopora somaliensis
- Goniopora stutchburyi
- Goniopora sultani
- Goniopora tenuidens
- Porites arnaudi
- Mustard hill coral (Porites astreoides)
- Porites australiensis
- Porites bernardi
- Porites brighami
- Porites columnaris
- Porites compressa
- Thin finger coral (Porites divaricata)
- Porites duerdeni
- Branched finger coral (Porites furcata)
- Porites heronensis
- Porites latistella
- Porites lichen
- Porites lutea
- Porites mayeri
- Porites monticulosa
- Porites myrmidonensis
- Porites nodifera
- Porites panamensis
- Porites porites
- Porites profundus
- Porites rus
- Porites solida
- Porites studeri
- Porites vaughani
- Stylaraea punctata

===== Brain corals =====
- Barabattoia amicorum
- Caulastrea furcata
- Tube coral (Cladocora arbuscula)
- Boulder brain coral (Colpophyllia natans)
- Cyphastrea chalcidicum
- Cyphastrea decadia
- Cyphastrea japonica
- Cyphastrea microphthalma
- Cyphastrea serailia
- Knobby brain coral (Diploria clivosa)
- Grooved brain coral (Diploria labyrinthiformis)
- Symmetrical brain coral (Diploria strigosa)
- Echinopora gemmacea
- Echinopora hirsutissima
- Echinopora lamellosa
- Favia danae
- Head coral (Favia favus)
- Golfball coral (Favia fragum)
- Favia pallida
- Favia rotumana
- Favia speciosa
- Favia truncatus
- Favites pentagona
- Goniastrea aspera
- Goniastrea australensis
- Goniastrea edwardsi
- Goniastrea pectinata
- Goniastrea retiformis
- Leptastrea pruinosa
- Leptastrea purpurea
- Leptastrea transversa
- Rose coral (Manicina areolata)
- Great star coral (Montastraea cavernosa)
- Montastrea curta
- Oulastrea crispata
- Oulophyllia levis
- Platygyra contorta
- Brain coral (Platygyra daedalea)
- Platygyra pini
- Platygyra sinensis
- Plesiastrea versipora
- Smooth star coral (Solenastrea bournoni)
- Knobby star coral (Solenastrea hyades)

===== Pocilloporids =====
- Pocillopora capitata
- Cauliflower coral (Pocillopora damicornis)
- Pocillopora kelleheri
- Pocillopora ligulata
- Pocillopora meandrina
- Pocillopora setichelli
- Rasp coral (Pocillopora verrucosa)
- Pocillopora woodjonesi
- Pocillopora zelli
- Seriatopora guttatus
- Thin birdsnest coral (Seriatopora hystrix)
- Stylophora danae
- Stylophora kuehlmanni
- Stylophora mamillata
- Stylophora subseriata

===== Mussids =====
- Acanthastrea echinata
- Blastomussa merleti
- Rough star coral (Isophyllastrea rigida)
- Sinuous cactus coral (Isophyllia sinuosa)
- Brain root coral (Lobophyllia corymbosa)
- Lobophyllia hataii
- Largebrain root coral (Lobophyllia hemprichii)
- Lobophyllia robusta
- Spiny flower coral (Mussa angulosa)
- Knobby cactus coral (Mycetophyllia aliciae)
- Lowridge cactus coral (Mycetophyllia danaana)
- Ridged cactus coarl (Mycetophyllia lamarckiana)
- Scolymia australis
- Artichoke coral (Scolymia cubensis)
- Scolymia lacera
- Symphyllia agaricia
- Symphyllia erythraea
- Symphyllia radians
- Symphyllia recta
- Symphyllia valenciennesii
- Symphyllia wilsoni

===== Pectiniids =====
- Acanthastrea rotundoflora
- Echinophyllia aspera
- Echinophyllia echinata
- Echinophyllia echinoporoides
- Echinophyllia orpheensis
- Echinophyllia patula
- Mycedium elephantotus
- Mycedium mancaoi
- Mycedium robokaki
- Mycedium umbra
- Oxypora crassispinosa
- Oxypora glabra
- Oxypora lacera

===== Siderastreids =====
- Coscinaraea columna
- Coscinaraea exesa
- Coscinaraea marshae
- Coscinaraea mcneilli
- Coscinaraea monile
- Coscinaraea wellsi
- Craterestrea levis
- Psammocora explanulata
- Psammocora haimeana
- Psammocora nierstraszi
- Psammocora profundacella
- Psammocora superficialis
- Lesser starlet coral (Siderastrea radians)
- Siderastrea savignyana
- Massive starlet coral (Siderastrea siderea)

===== Agariciids =====
- Agaricia agaricites
- Graham's sheet coral (Agaricia grahamae)
- Lowrelief lettuce coral (Agaricia humilis)
- Coeloseris mayeri
- Gardineroseris planulata
- Sunray lettuce coral (Helioseris cucullata)
- Leptoseris cailleti
- Leptoseris explanata
- Leptoseris foliosa
- Leptoseris gardineri
- Leptoseris hawaiiensis
- Leptoseris mycetoseroides
- Leptoseris papyracea
- Leptoseris scabra
- Leptoseris solida
- Leptoseris tubulifera
- Pachyseris foliosa
- Pachyseris speciosa
- Pavona chiriquiensis
- Pavona clavus
- Porkchop coral (Pavona duerdeni)
- Pavona explanulata
- Pavona frondifera
- Pavona gigantea
- Pavona maldivensis
- Pavona varians

===== Merulinids =====
- Hydnophora grandis
- Hydnophora pilosa
- Hydnophora rigida
- Merulina ampliata
- Merulina scabricula
- Merulina scheeri
- Scapophyllia cylindrica

===== Caryophylliids =====
- Heterocyathus aequicostatus
- Heterocyathus alternatus
- Heterocyathus sulcatus

===== Fungiids =====
- Cantharellus doederleini
- Cantharellus jebbi
- Ctenactis crassa
- Ctenactis echinata
- Fungia concinna
- Fungia costulata
- Fungia cyclolites
- Distorted mushroom coral (Fungia distorta)
- Fungia fragilis
- Fungia fralinae
- Fungia granulosa
- Fungia hexagonalis
- Fungia horrida
- Fungia moluccensis
- Elongate mushroom coral (Fungia paumotensis)
- Fungia repanda
- Fungia scabra
- Fungia scruposa
- Fungia scutaria
- Fungia sinensis
- Fungia somervillei
- Fungia spinifer
- Fungia tenuis
- Fungia vaughani
- Bowl coral (Halomitra pileus)
- Herpolitha limax
- Lithophyllon mokai
- Podabacia crustacea
- Feather coral (Polyphyllia talpina)
- Sandalolitha dentata
- Sandalolitha robusta
- Zoopilus echinatus

===== Astrocoeniids =====
- Yellow pencil coral (Madracis auretenra)
- Ten-ray star coral (Madracis decactis)
- Eight-ray finger coral (Madracis formosa)
- Madracis kirbyi
- Star coral (Madracis pharensis)
- Six-ray star coral (Madracis senaria)
- Blushing star coral (Stephanocoenia intersepta)
- Stylocoeniella armata
- Stylocoeniella guentheri

===== Rhizangiids =====
- Astrangia poculata

== Arthropods ==
There are 4069 arthropod species and 27 arthropod subspecies assessed as least concern.

== Echinoderms ==
There are 111 echinoderm species assessed as least concern.

=== Sea cucumbers ===
- Five-toothed sea cucumber (Actinopyga agassizii)
- Actinopyga crassa
- Actinopyga flammea
- Panning's blackfish (Actinopyga palauensis)
- New Caledonia blackfish (Actinopyga spinea)
- Amphigymnas bahamensis
- California sea cucumber (Apostichopus californicus)
- Apostichopus leukothele
- Astichopus multifidus
- Australostichopus mollis
- Bathyplotes golden-hindi
- Bathyplotes natans
- Bathyplotes pourtalesii
- Benthothuria cristata
- Benthothuria funebris
- Bohadschia argus
- Bohadschia cousteaui
- Capheira mollis
- Capheira sulcata
- Hansenothuria benti
- Lollyfish (Holothuria atra)
- Holothuria austrinabassa
- Ashy sea cucumber (Holothuria cinerascens)
- Holothuria coluber
- Holothuria cubana
- Holothuria dakarensis
- Holothuria difficilis
- Pinkfish (Holothuria edulis)
- Holothuria erinaceaus
- Holothuria flavomaculata
- Holothuria floridana
- Holothuria forskali
- Holothuria fuscocinerea
- Elephant trunkfish (Holothuria fuscopunctata)
- Holothuria glaberrima
- Holothuria grisea
- Holothuria hawaiiensis
- Holothuria helleri
- Holothuria hilla
- Holothuria imitans
- Holothuria immobilis
- Holothuria inhabilis
- Holothuria insignis
- Holothuria isuga
- Holothuria languens
- Holothuria lentiginosa
- White thread fish (Holothuria leucospilota)
- Holothuria lubrica
- Holothuria mammata
- Holothuria manningi
- Donkey dung (Holothuria mexicana)
- Holothuria moebii
- Holothuria occidentalis
- Holothuria paraprinceps
- Holothuria pardalis
- Holothuria parvula
- Holothuria pervicax
- Holothuria pluricuriosa
- Holothuria poli
- Holothuria princeps
- Holothuria pseudofossor
- Holothuria rathbunii
- Holothuria rigida
- Holothuria sanctori
- Holothuria surinamensis
- Holothuria thomasi
- Holothuria tubulosa
- Holothuria turriscelsa
- Holothuria verrucosa
- Holothuria zacae
- Three-rowed sea cucumber (Isostichopus badionotus)
- Labidodemas americanum
- Labidodemas maccullochi
- Labidodemas pertinax
- Labidodemas rugosum
- Labidodemas semperianum
- Mesothuria gargantua
- Mesothuria intestinalis
- Mesothuria lactea
- Mesothuria magellani
- Mesothuria megapoda
- Mesothuria multipes
- Mesothuria murrayi
- Mesothuria rugosa
- Molpadiodemas constrictus
- Molpadiodemas epibiotus
- Molpadiodemas porphyrus
- Molpadiodemas villosus
- Molpadiodemas violaceus
- Paelopatides appendiculata
- Paelopatides mammillatus
- Paelopatides retifer
- Parastichopus regalis
- Paroriza grevei
- Blackspotted sea cucumber (Pearsonothuria graeffei)
- Pseudostichopus elegans
- Pseudostichopus hyalegerus
- Stichopus chloronotus
- New Zealand sea cucumber (Stichopus mollis)
- Stichopus naso
- Stichopus noctivagus
- Stichopus vastus
- Synallactes aenigma
- Synallactes alexandri
- Synallactes challengeri
- Synallactes crucifera
- Synallactes gilberti
- Synallactes horridus
- Synallactes nozawai
- Synallactes sagamiensis
- Synallactes triradiata

== See also ==
- Lists of IUCN Red List least concern species
- List of near threatened invertebrates
- List of vulnerable invertebrates
- List of endangered invertebrates
- List of critically endangered invertebrates
- List of recently extinct invertebrates
- List of data deficient invertebrates
