= Hump coral =

Hump coral may refer to several different species of coral:

- Porites compressa Dana, 1846
- Porites cylindrica Dana, 1846
- Porites furcata Lamarck, 1816
- Porites porites Pallas, 1766
