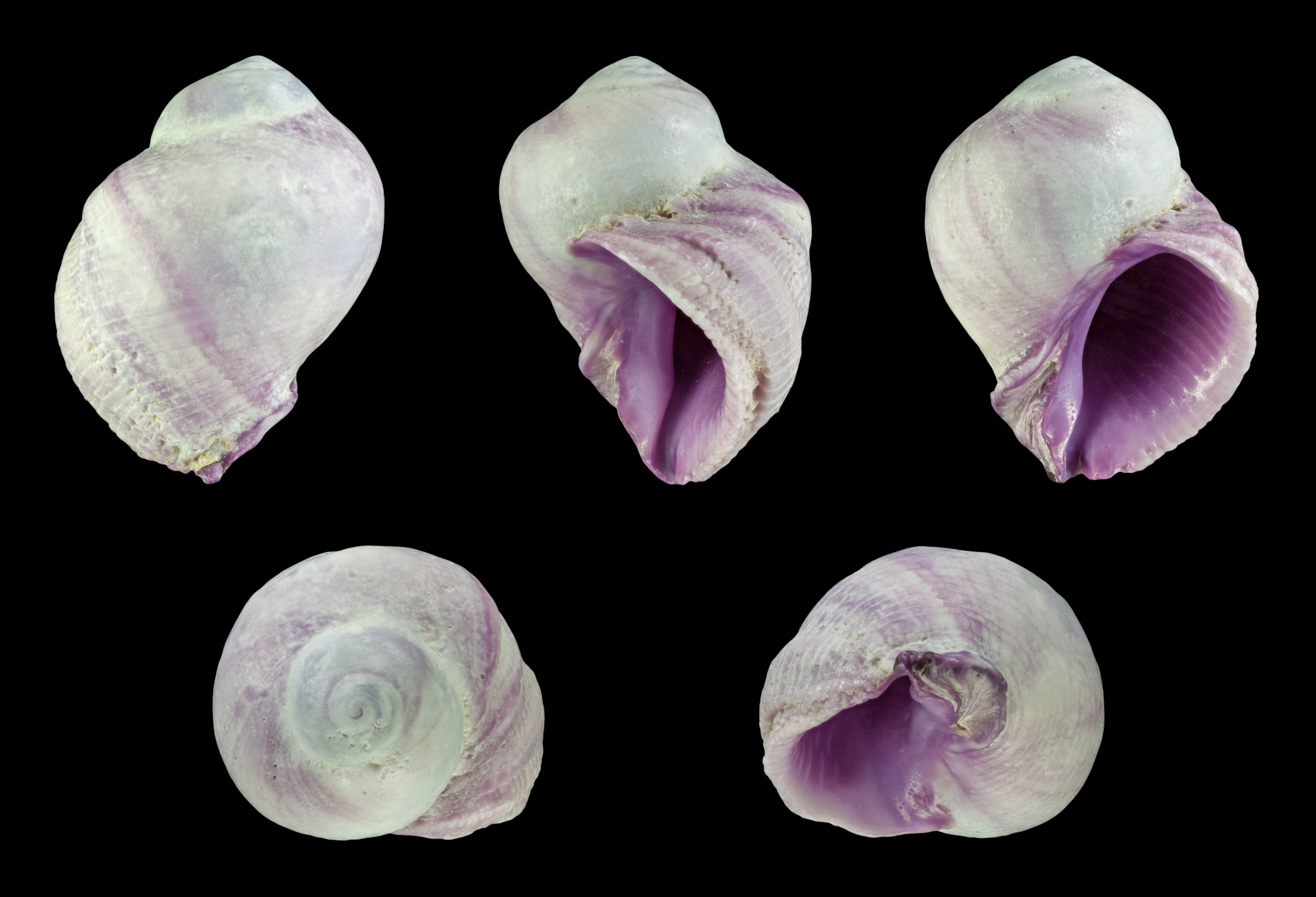

Scientific classification
- Kingdom: Animalia
- Phylum: Mollusca
- Class: Gastropoda
- Subclass: Caenogastropoda
- Order: Neogastropoda
- Family: Muricidae
- Genus: Coralliophila
- Species: C. violacea

Binomial name
- Coralliophila violacea Kiener, 1836

Synonyms
- Coralliophila neritoidea (Gmelin, 1791); Fusus neritoideus (Name generally attributed to Lamarck, 1816, but in fact a new combination of Murex neritoideus of Gmelin); Murex neritoideus Chemnitz, 1788 (Unavailable name: published in non-binomial work); Murex neritoideus Gmelin, 1791 (Invalid: junior homonym of Murex neritoideus Linnaeus, 1767); Purpura violacea Kiener, 1836 (basionym)

= Coralliophila violacea =

Species of gastropod

Coralliophila violacea, known as the violet coral shell or purple coral snail, is a species of sea snail in the family Muricidae, the murex snails or rock snails.

== Description ==
=== Exterior shell and structure ===
Shells of C. violacea are typically bulbous with an off-white exterior and a violet aperture. The shell size varies between 17 and 47 millimetres (0.67 and 1.85 in) with a very low spire. The exterior of the shell is described as naturally scabrous, though usually covered in calcareous organisms that create a crust layer over the exterior. The shell's operculum is dark brown. C. violacea has two to three postnuclear whorls which are followed by the large body whorl that has several fine spiral lines. Female snails have notably larger shells than male snails, though as the species is simultaneously hermaphroditic, one snail may be identified as two sexes during its lifespan.

=== Living snail ===
The snail inhabiting the shell attaches to coral via the foot. The operculum can be used to estimate the age of the coral, as each striation represents approximately one year of growth.

== Distribution and habitat ==
This species is distributed in the Red Sea and in the Indian Ocean along Aldabra, Chagos, Kenya, Madagascar and Tanzania, in the Indo-Pacific and along the Galapagos Islands.

C. violacea is a colonial species that lives on coral. The species prefers shallow waters, with the majority of specimens being found between 10 and 20 meters below the surface, and all specimens documented less than 100 meters below the surface.

== Behavior ==
=== Diet ===
C. violacea is a carnivorous and parasitic predator, and are considered obligate ectoparasites. Like other members of its genus, C. violacea feeds on the living tissue of various corals, causing tissue damage to the corals it lives upon, and further feeding as the coral attempts to repair the tissue damage. Damage to the corals is typically minor, though C. violacea sometimes congregate, causing significant damage associated with larger colonies living on the coral. It is found in association with reef-building corals such as Porites, specifically Porites cylindrica and Porites lobata.

=== Reproduction ===
Purple coral snails are sequential hermaphrodites. Larger shell size in females is associated with higher fecundity. Females produce oval egg sacs and retain them within the mantle cavity; fertilization and brooding occur internally. After the eggs are hatched, they are dispersed from the egg sac in planktonic form and continue development outside of the female. During this development phase, the foot begins to take visible shape. Reproduction occurs on the coral site that the snail is attached to and feeds on for the majority of its lifespan.

=== Locomotion ===
Following the planktonic larval stage, C. violacea is sedentary and lives for significant periods of time on the same coral that it feeds on.
