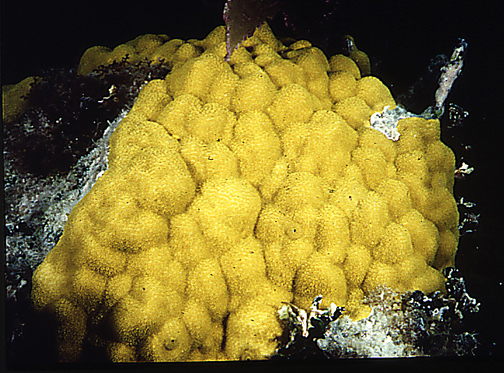

Conservation status
- Least Concern (IUCN 3.1)

Scientific classification
- Kingdom: Animalia
- Phylum: Cnidaria
- Subphylum: Anthozoa
- Class: Hexacorallia
- Order: Scleractinia
- Family: Poritidae
- Genus: Porites
- Species: P. astreoides

Binomial name
- Porites astreoides Lamarck, 1816

Synonyms
- Porites hentscheli Thiel, 1928; Porites verrillii Rehberg, 1892

= Porites astreoides =

Species of coral

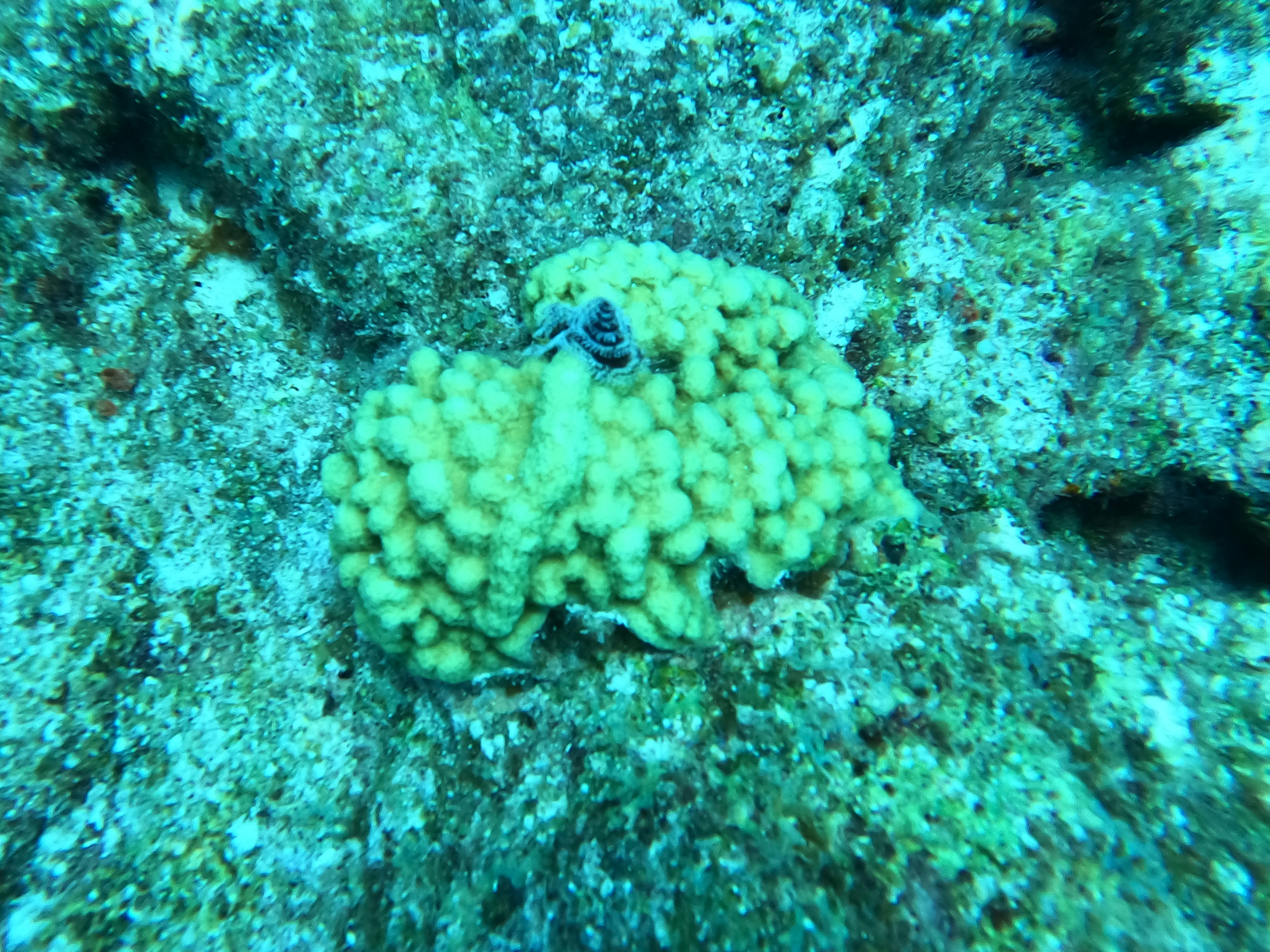
Colony at Molasses Reef inhabited by a Christmas tree worm

Porites astreoides, commonly known as mustard hill coral or yellow porites, is a colonial species of stony coral in the family Poritidae.

It is a common species in the Caribbean Sea and western tropical Atlantic Ocean in North, Central, and South America; and the eastern tropical Atlantic Ocean in western Africa.

== Description ==
When it grows in fast-flowing, shallow water, Porites astreoides is encrusting but in calmer water at medium depths it is a massive coral with a smooth, mounded, semi-spherical form and can grow to 60 centimetres (24 in) in diameter. At greater depths it is usually plate-like and in caves and under overhangs the plates are angled to receive the maximum amount of light. It is the only species within the genus Porites not to have a finger-like form. The corallites are small and tightly-packed and give the coral a porous appearance. The polyps each have six tentacles and are generally retracted during the day. This coral is yellow, yellowish-green, pale grey or pale brown, a colour given to it by the dinoflagellate zooxanthellae, microscopic algae that live symbiotically within the coral's tissue.

== Distribution and habitat ==
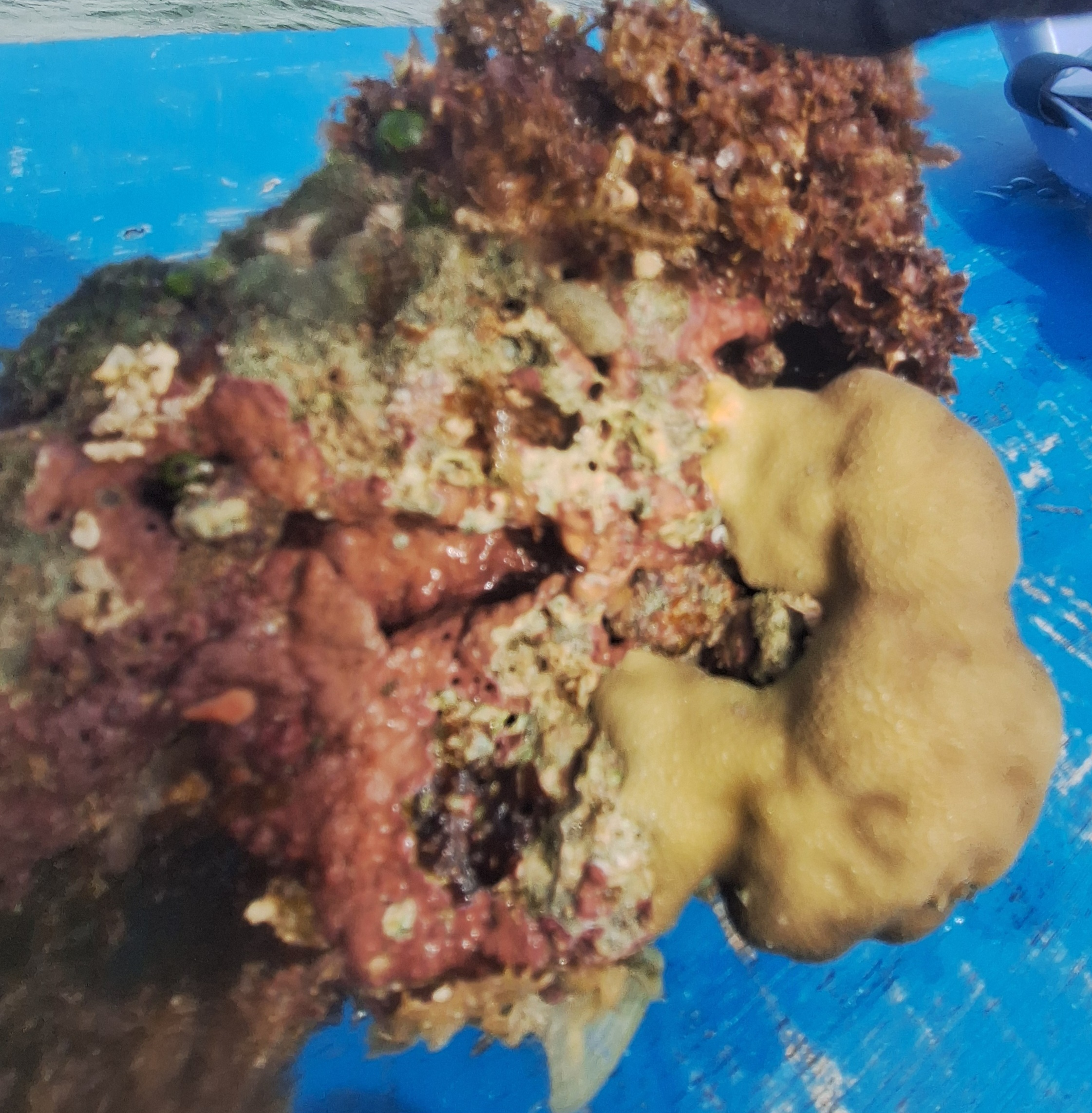
Porites astreoides found in the Philippines.

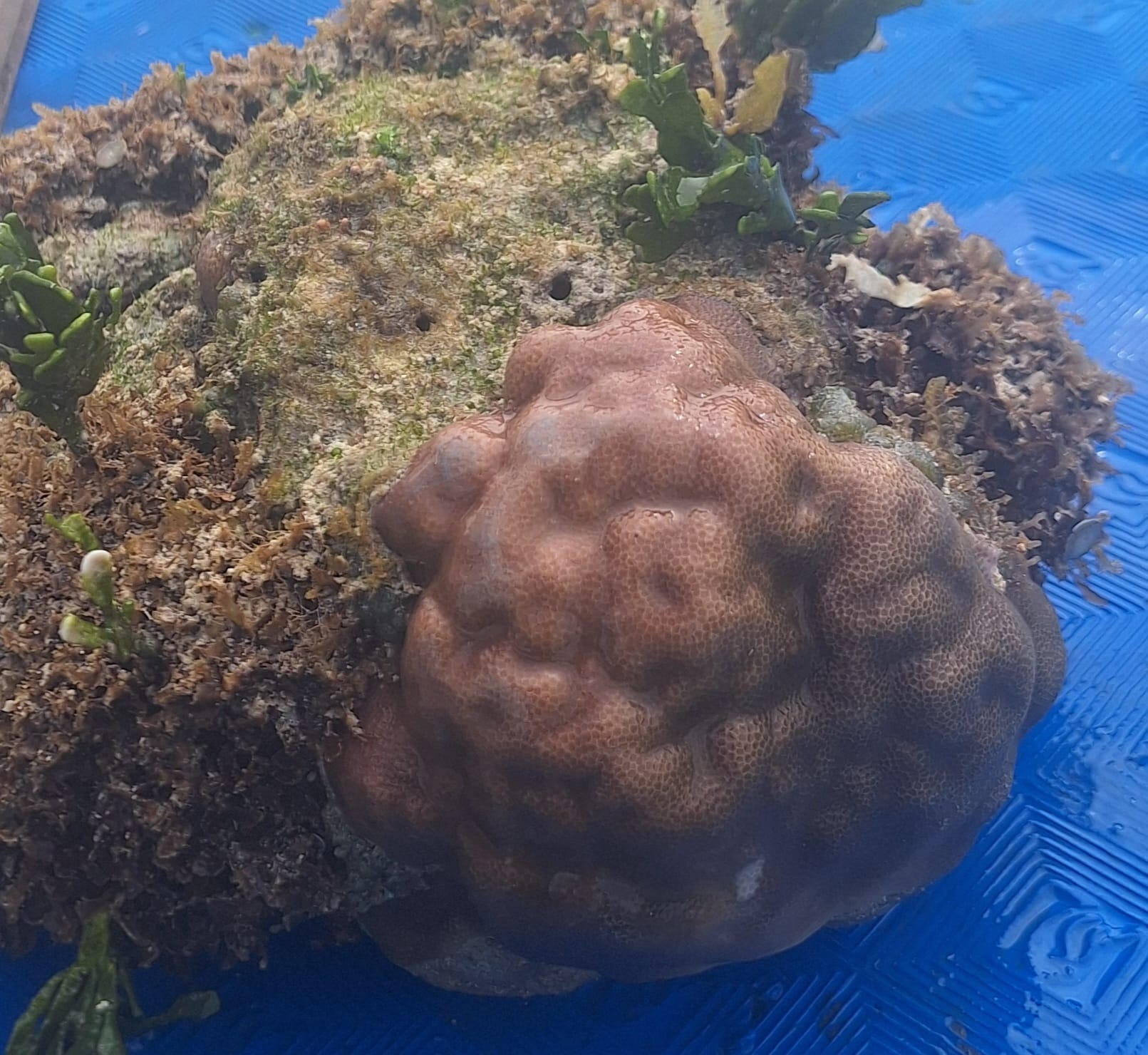
Another kind of Mustard hill coral from the Philippines.

Porites astreoides is found growing in shallow water on reefs in the Caribbean Sea and in the western-central and southwestern Atlantic Ocean in the Caribbean region and tropical North America, Central America, and South America; and the eastern-central Atlantic Ocean in tropical western Africa. It is a common species on all parts of a reef and in lagoons. It usually grows in water less than 15 metres (50 ft) deep but may occasionally be found at depths of up to 50 metres (160 ft). It is sometimes free-living, growing on loose bits of coral, pebbles or mollusc shells. Large domed colonies sometimes appear to be separated into several lobes. This happens when part of the coral has died, and the living tissue in between the dead patches continues to develop, giving a clumped effect.

== Biology ==
The polyps of Porites astreoides feed mostly at night, extending their tentacles to catch zooplankton and bacteria. The coral also obtains an important part of its nutritional needs as a result of the photosynthesis performed by the zooxanthellae in sunlight.

Some colonies of Porites astreoides are female while others are hermaphroditic. Sexual reproduction occurs with male gametes being released into the sea around the time of the new moon. The sperm gets drawn into other polyps where fertilization takes place. The larvae are initially brooded but are liberated into the sea at about the time of the full moon. The planula larvae then drift with the currents for some time before settling onto the seabed and metamorphosing into new polyps. Each of these grows into a new colony by secreting a calcareous skeleton and budding. This is initially extratentacular budding, taking place at the side of the polyp, but at a later stage in the development of the colony, the budding is intratentacular, taking place within the ring of tentacles.

== Ecology ==
Porites astreoides often has the sponge Mycale laevis, with prominent osculi, growing on its underside. This coral is also often associated with fan worms. The polyps contain stinging cells known as nematocysts to try to ward off the stoplight parrotfish, other reef fish, snails, worms and starfish that feed on it. It is also important to the coral to be in an unshaded position where its zooxanthellae can function fully. Sedimentation may limit this but under good conditions, this coral can grow at the rate of about 3.5 millimetres (0.14 in) per year.

The IUCN Red List of Threatened Species ranks this coral as being of "least concern" as, within its range, it is widespread and common. Compared to other members of its genus, it is resistant to disease and bleaching and lives in deeper water so may be less affected by rising sea temperatures.
