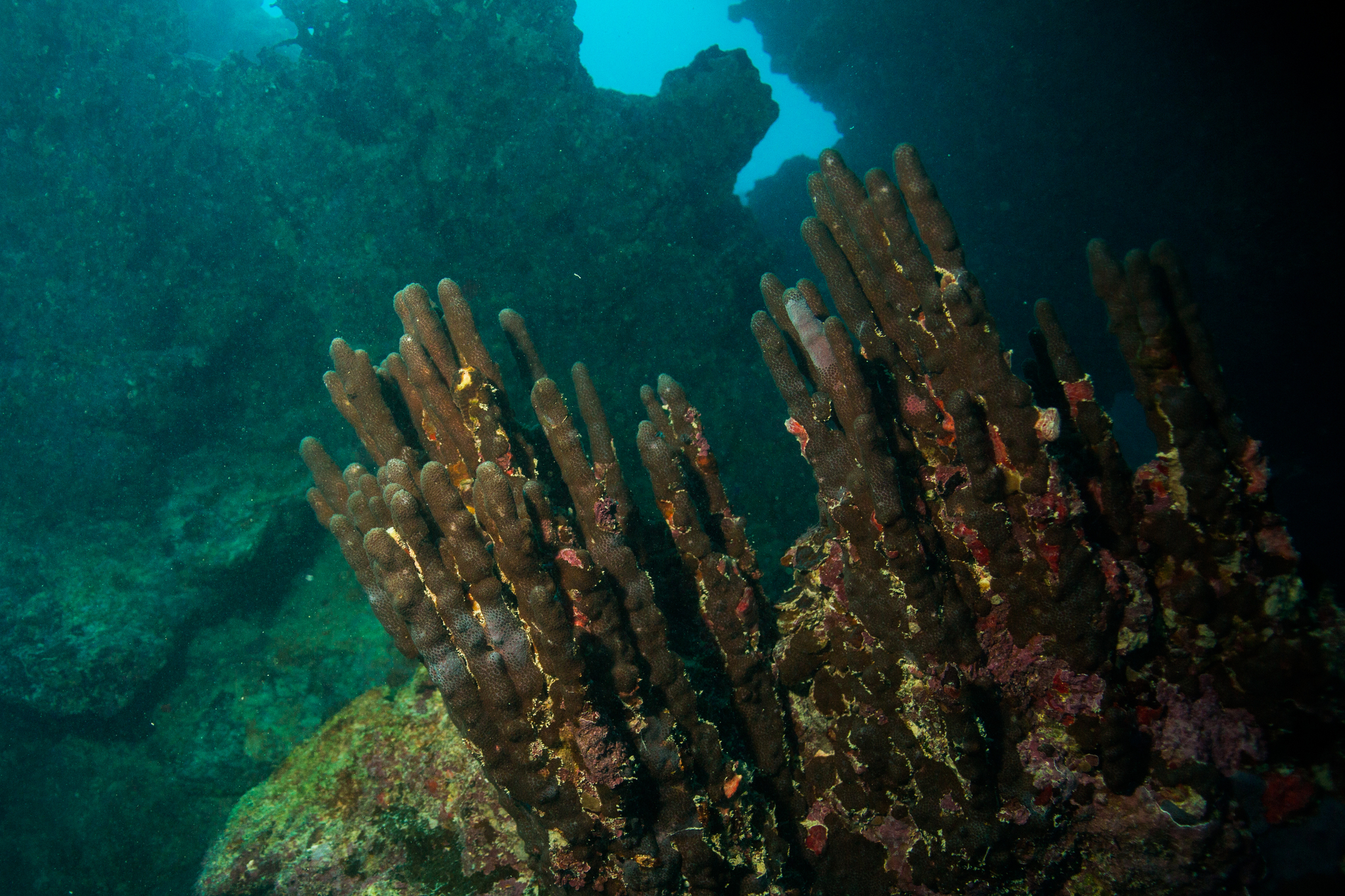

Conservation status
- Near Threatened (IUCN 3.1)

- Vulnerable (NatureServe)

Scientific classification
- Kingdom: Animalia
- Phylum: Cnidaria
- Subphylum: Anthozoa
- Class: Hexacorallia
- Order: Scleractinia
- Family: Poritidae
- Genus: Porites
- Species: P. branneri

Binomial name
- Porites branneri Rathbun, 1888

= Porites branneri =

Species of coral

Porites branneri, known by the common name blue crust coral, is a species of stony coral in the family Poritidae. It is found growing on reefs in the Caribbean Sea and the northern and eastern coasts of South America.

== Description ==
P. branneri is an encrusting coral that forms patches up to 15 cm (6 in) in diameter with knobbly projections some 2.5 cm (1 in) across. The corallites are small and pentagonal, giving the surface of the coral a pitted appearance when the polyps are retracted. When the polyps are extended to feed, the surface appears fuzzy. This coral is pale blue, lilac or purple in colour.

== Distribution and habitat ==
P. branneri is native to shallow water habitats in the southern Caribbean Sea and the northern coasts of South America. Its range includes Jamaica, the Cayman Islands, Colombia, Venezuela, Trinidad and Tobago, and northern and eastern Brazil, between Ceará and Cabo Frio. It occurs on reefs, in channels and pools in the intertidal zone, in places with vigorous movement of water, to a maximum depth of 3 m (10 ft).

== Status ==
The greatest threat that this coral faces is loss of habitat due to damage to the shallow water reefs where it lives. It is susceptible to coral diseases but fairly resistant to coral bleaching. In general it is an uncommon species, although it is rather more common growing among thickets of Elkhorn coral (Acropora palmata) in the southern Caribbean. Although no precise population figures or trends are known, the International Union for Conservation of Nature has assessed the conservation status of this coral as near threatened.
