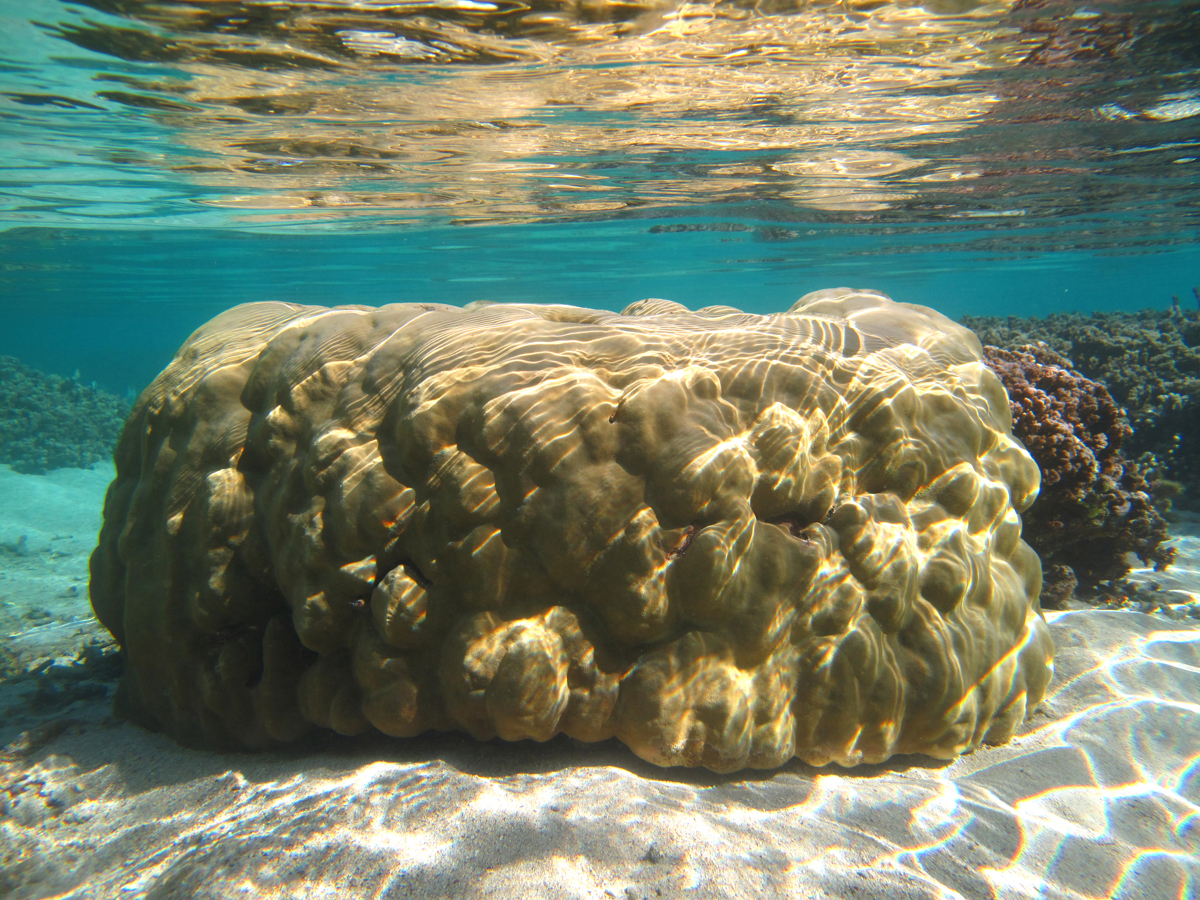
- Porites lutea off Réunion

Conservation status
- Least Concern (IUCN 3.1)

Scientific classification
- Kingdom: Animalia
- Phylum: Cnidaria
- Subphylum: Anthozoa
- Class: Hexacorallia
- Order: Scleractinia
- Family: Poritidae
- Genus: Porites
- Species: P. lutea

Binomial name
- Porites lutea Milne Edwards & Haime, 1851

Synonyms
- Madrepora arenosa Esper, 1797; Porites arenosa (Esper, 1797); Porites haddoni Vaughan, 1918; Porites tenuis Verrill, 1866

= Porites lutea =

Species of coral

Porites lutea is a species of stony coral in the family Poritidae. It is found growing in very shallow water on reefs in the Indo-Pacific region. It sometimes forms "microatolls" in the intertidal zone and these massive structures have been used to study trends in sea levels and sea water temperature.

== Description ==
Porites lutea forms massive, smooth, hemispherical mounds or helmet-shaped colonies up to 4 m (13 ft) across. The corallites have thin walls and are closely packed, some 1 to 1.5 mm (0.04 to 0.06 in) in diameter. In contrast to Porites lobata, the corallites are well-filled with skeletal elements, including five tall pali near the centre. The colour of this coral is usually cream or yellow, but other bright colours sometimes occur in shallow-water habitats.

== Distribution and habitat ==
Porites lutea is native to the tropical Indo-Pacific region. Its range extends from Madagascar and the east coast of Africa to Malaysia, Indonesia, the Philippines, Japan and northern and eastern Australia. It occurs on back reef margins, in lagoons and on fringing reefs. It is a common species, often occurring with Porites australiensis and Porites lobata.

== Ecology ==
This coral can form "microatolls" in the intertidal zone; these are disc-shaped mounds with dead coral material at the top and living material round the perimeter which continues to grow sideways. Sometimes these structures remain as fossil microatolls in which no living polyps survive but the colony morphology is retained. Fossil microatolls of Porites lutea, combined with precise dating of individual annual growth rings using the uranium–thorium dating method, allows these structures to be used to determine past relative changes in sea-level. Their use for this purpose on reefs in the South China Sea has shown that during the period 7000–6550 years before 2000, the sea level was about 170 to 220 centimetres (67 to 87 in) higher than now, with four or more cycles of fluctuations.

In Yemen, the non-native, invasive, encrusting red sponge Clathria aceratoobtusa grows over the surface of the coral, at the rate of about 1 cm (0.4 in) per month, smothering and killing it. A thin white line of dead tissue separates the healthy coral tissues from the advancing sponge.

Sometimes fragments of Porites lutea become detached from colonies. These may remain alive and end up further down the reef slope, or moved to a new location by currents or waves; in this way new colonies or even new reefs may form in locations unsuitable for larval settlement.

== Research ==
The growth rate of corals is influenced by environmental conditions; massive corals lay down a band of calcium carbonate each year, and the thickness of the band indicates the rate of growth. Researchers in Indonesia have studied the growth rate of Porites lutea and correlated it with the El Niño phenomenon. Growth rates were higher on windward slopes with greater wave action, and lower on lee slopes with less water movement. Rates were at their highest in 1992, when the sea temperature was about 28 °C (82 °F), and at their lowest in 1998 when it was 29.6 °C (85.3 °F). The correlation between water temperature and growth rate was complex, but in general growth rates of the coral were lower when the coral was stressed by higher water temperatures.

Exposure of Porites lutea to increased concentration of iron causes bleaching through loss of symbiotic zooxanthellae; however the effect is less marked in corals previously exposed to raised levels of iron, suggesting the development of tolerance to the metal.
