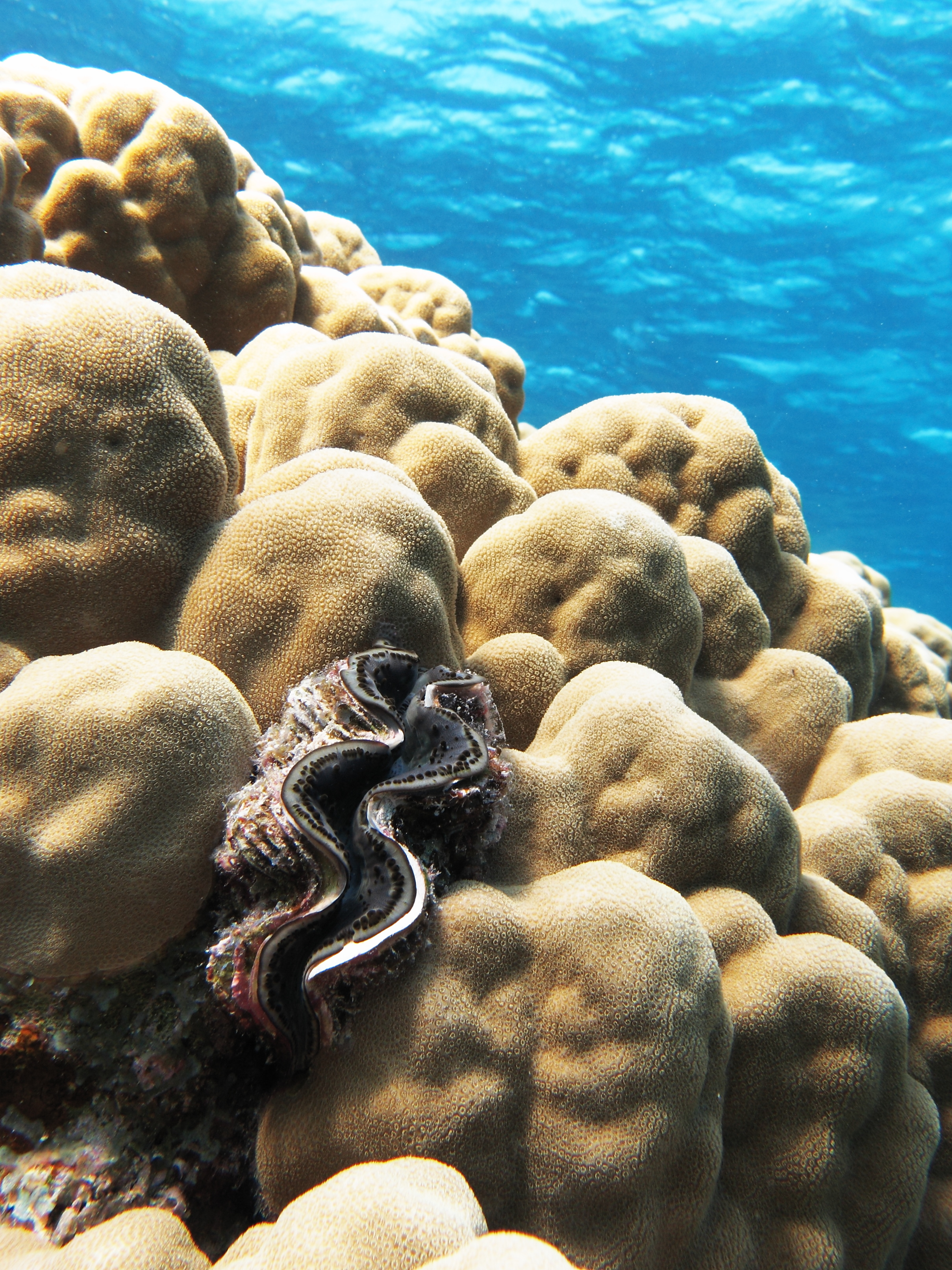
- Porites nodifera with a tridacna clam

Conservation status
- Least Concern (IUCN 3.1)

Scientific classification
- Kingdom: Animalia
- Phylum: Cnidaria
- Subphylum: Anthozoa
- Class: Hexacorallia
- Order: Scleractinia
- Family: Poritidae
- Genus: Porites
- Species: P. nodifera

Binomial name
- Porites nodifera Klunzinger, 1879

Synonyms
- Porites clavaria Lamarck, 1816

= Porites nodifera =

Species of coral

Porites nodifera, also known as dome coral, is a species of stony coral in the Poritidae family.

It was first described by Carl Benjamin Klunzinger, a German physician and zoologist active in the Red Sea region in the 1860s, and classifying its species in the 1870s and 1880s.

== Appearance ==
Porites nodifera have a hard substrate and grow in column-like structures toward the surface of the water. The surface of each column tends to take on a relatively flat, circular shape and the coral has a fairly smooth surface. Overall, the color of the coral ranges from a dark brown to a light brown. It takes on a similar appearance to Porites harrisoni, which is a popular Porites species that is also found in the Persian Gulf; however, Porites nodifera tend to form columns that are substantially thicker in comparison.

== Distribution ==
Porites nodifera is native to the northwestern Indian Ocean, including the Red Sea, Gulf of Aden, and Persian Gulf. It is found in shallow water, generally at depths less than 5 metres (16 ft), but up to 15 metres (49 ft) deep.

It is tolerant of salinities of up to 4.8% and therefore is very common in areas of high salinities where sea grasses also dominate the habitat. Salinity is an ecological factor which limits the lower zones of coral reefs so the species is able to dominate the lowest zones of the Dahab Reef in Egypt in particular, forming a considerable single species stand. There is only one species in this area that co-exists in the lowest zone of the reef slope in very sparse numbers; Millepora sp. Porites nodifera can also be found in areas of normal Red Sea salinities (4.0-4.2%), but does not tend to dominate these zones because of interspecific competition from a variety of other coral species.

In the Persian Gulf, Porites nodifera and other Porites species are the dominant corals present. This may be as a result of coral bleaching affecting Acropora coral species to a greater extent, and Porites filling in resulting gaps in the reef.

== Arabian Yellow Band Disease ==
Porites nodifera can become infected with a disease known as Arabian Yellow Band Disease, also referred to as AYBD, in their lifetime as it common amongst several coral species in the Persian Gulf. Species who contrast AYBD are seen having a yellow band encompassing the coral. This yellow band encroaches on uninfected tissue, thereby killing the healthy tissue. Corals, especially those of the Porites nodifera species, are able to overcome AYBD as it is often seen to halt its manifestation and become inactive prior to infecting the entire coral, allowing the coral to rejuvenate itself by building new skeletons.

== Conservation ==
This coral is an IUCN Red List Least concern species currently. The most important known threat for this species is the extensive reduction of coral reef habitat due to a combination of threats, including climate change and ocean acidification.

In 2020, a study conducted in the Red Sea suggested that this species has a high tolerance to the increasing environmental temperature, and perhaps, will be used by other species as a refuge due to this ability.
