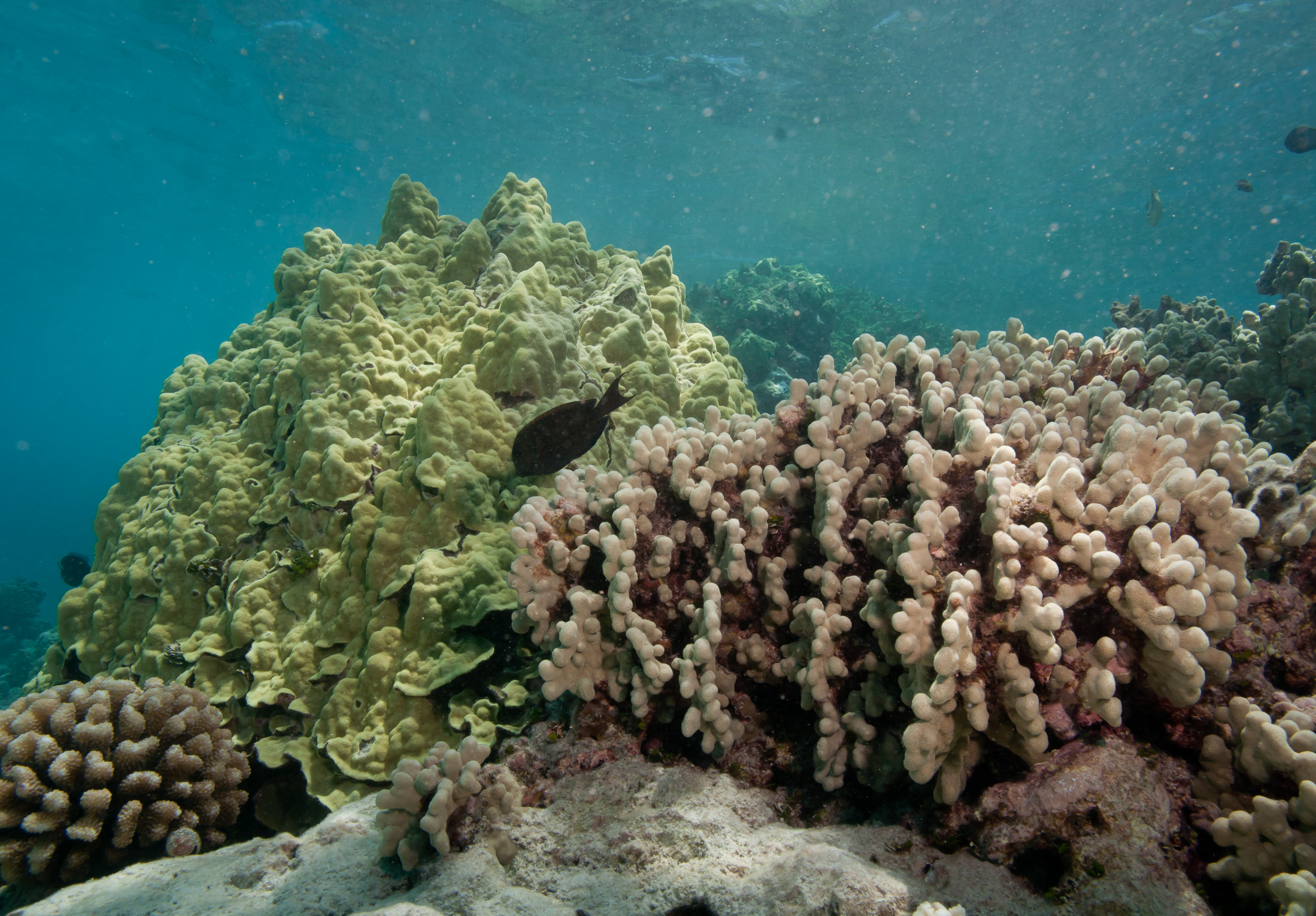
- Left-to-right: Pocillopora meandrina, Porites lobata, Porites compressa

Conservation status
- Least Concern (IUCN 3.1)

Scientific classification
- Kingdom: Animalia
- Phylum: Cnidaria
- Subphylum: Anthozoa
- Class: Hexacorallia
- Order: Scleractinia
- Family: Poritidae
- Genus: Porites
- Species: P. compressa

Binomial name
- Porites compressa Dana, 1846

= Porites compressa =

Species of coral

Porites compressa, also known as Finger coral or Hump coral, is a species of marine stony coral in the family Poritidae. It is found growing on coral reefs and in shallow lagoons in tropical parts of the Indian and Pacific Oceans.

== Description ==
Porites compressa is generally pale brown or grey. In shallow water it resembles a knobbly boulder but in deeper water it is more columnar. The branches are cylindrical and often fuse together. The growth rate is slow but it often grows into large colonies which may be up to 1000 years old. It is a zooxanthellate coral, having symbiotic unicellular zooxanthellae in the tissues which provide it with energy.

== Distribution and habitat ==
Porites compressa occurs in the Indo-Pacific region, the Red Sea and East African coast. Around Hawaii it is common and is found on reefs and in lagoons to a depth of 30 metres (98 ft) where the water is relatively undisturbed. In Kaneohe Bay it is the dominant coral species and sometimes forms monospecific stands.

== Threats ==
Porites compressa is affected by rising sea temperatures but it is more resistant to bleaching than many other corals. It is more susceptible to coral diseases than some other species however and it is stressed corals that are most likely to succumb to disease. Coral reefs in general are under threat from many causes. These include El Nino events, ocean acidification, trawling and other fishery activities, competition from invasive species and human activities which includes pollution and the collection of corals for the aquarium trade.
