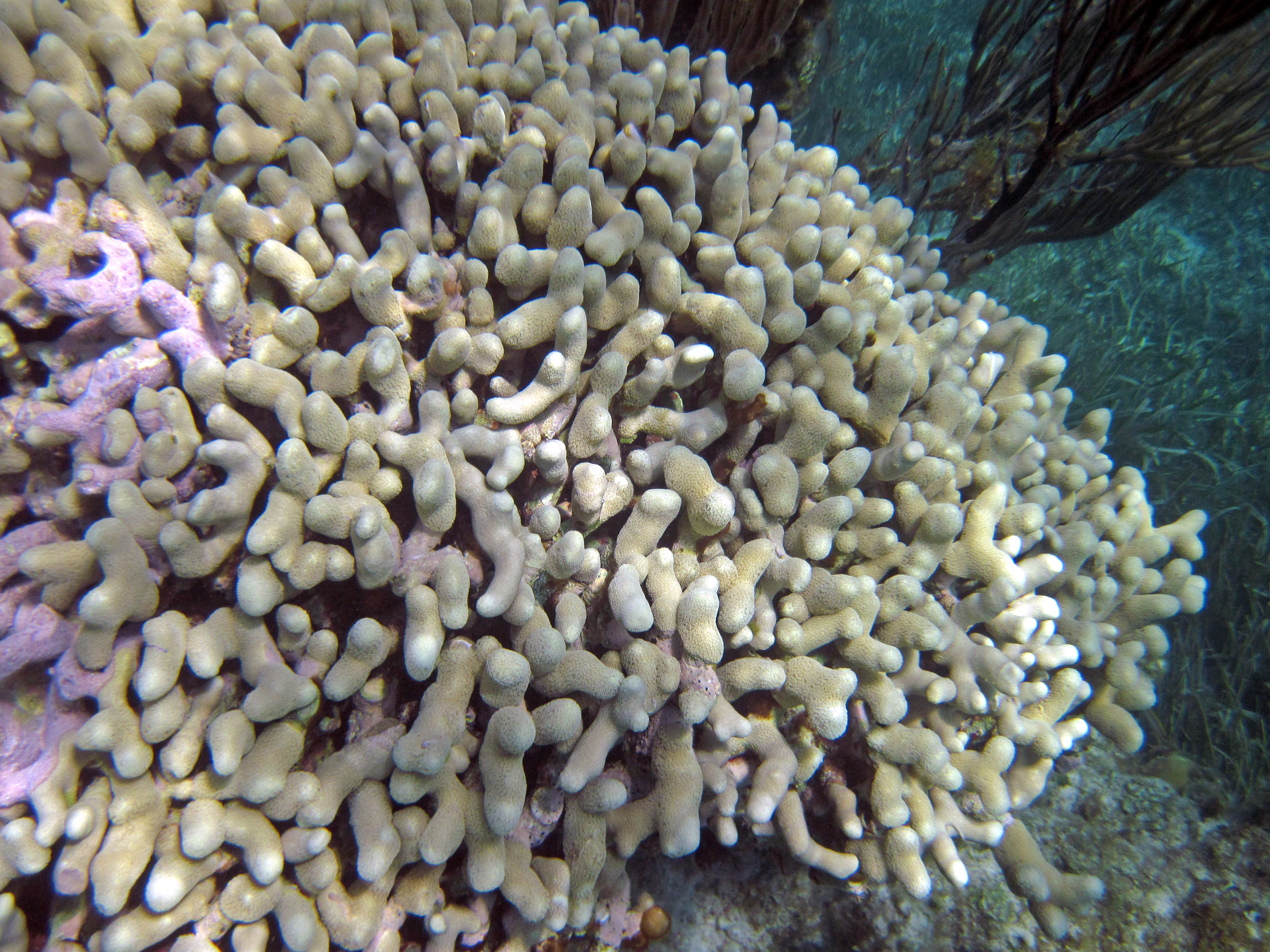

Conservation status
- Least Concern (IUCN 3.1)

Scientific classification
- Kingdom: Animalia
- Phylum: Cnidaria
- Subphylum: Anthozoa
- Class: Hexacorallia
- Order: Scleractinia
- Family: Poritidae
- Genus: Porites
- Species: P. furcata

Binomial name
- Porites furcata Lamarck, 1816

Synonyms
- Porites porites furcata Lamarck, 1816

= Porites furcata =

Species of coral

Porites furcata, commonly known as hump coral, thin finger coral or branched finger coral, is a species of stony coral in the genus Porites. It is found in the Caribbean Sea and western Atlantic Ocean.

== Description ==
Porites furcata is a colonial coral forming clumps of short, slender lobes with rounded tips, often densely packed together. It sometimes forms extensive patches several square metres (yards) in area. The colour of this coral is yellow or pale brown and the lobes grow to a diameter of 1 to 2 cm (0.4 to 0.8 in). The interior parts of the coral often have a purplish tinge and are dead, perhaps killed off by the increased shading and lack of water circulation caused by newer growth above. This species is intermediate in appearance between Porites porites which has branches 2.5 cm (1 in) wide and Porites divaricata, the branches of which are under 1 cm (0.4 in) wide.

== Distribution and habitat ==
Porites furcata is found in the Caribbean Sea, the Gulf of Mexico, the Bahamas and southern Florida from low water mark down to depths of about 20 metres (66 ft). It has not been found in Bermuda. Its preferred habitat is back reefs but it also occurs in other parts of the reef. In areas where this species is common, the dead, basal parts of the coral are responsible for most of the coral rubble on the reef. Grooves can sometimes be seen cutting across the colonies of this species. These are caused by heavy detached chunks of massive coral being moved across the reef during severe storms. Fossils of this species have been found in Florida dating back to the Pleistocene.

== Ecology ==
Porites furcata is a zooxanthellate coral, the tissues containing unicellular green algae living symbiotically within the cells. These are photosynthetic and use the carbon dioxide and waste products of the coral while at the same time supplying oxygen and organic compounds to their host. The polyps are often extended during the day.

The niches and crevices in this coral are home to a range of invertebrates and other organisms including brittle stars, sea urchins, polychaete worms, chitons and algae.

== Status ==
Porites furcata is listed as being of "Least Concern" in the IUCN Red List of Threatened Species. This is because it is a common species throughout its range and the population seems stable. It is a fairly adaptable species being found in a range of habitats but it is particularly susceptible to bleaching. Its chief threat is the loss of reef habitat through mechanical damage, violent storms, a rise in sea temperatures, ocean acidification, pollution, increased sedimentation and tourism.
