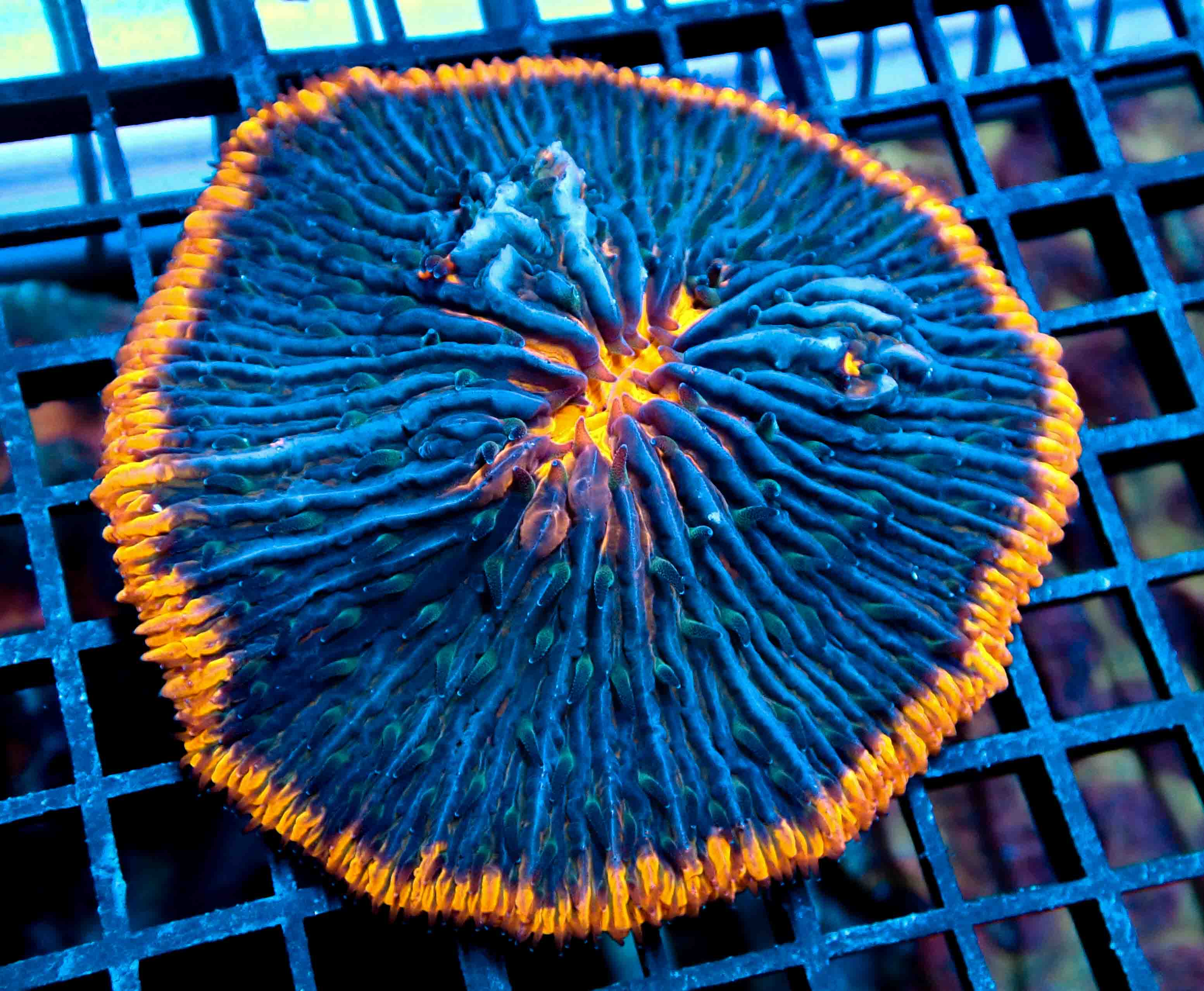
- Lithophyllon repanda

Scientific classification
- Kingdom: Animalia
- Phylum: Cnidaria
- Subphylum: Anthozoa
- Class: Hexacorallia
- Order: Scleractinia
- Family: Fungiidae
- Genus: Lithophyllon; Rehberg, 1892

Species
- See text

Synonyms
- Fungia (Verrillofungia) Wells, 1966

= Lithophyllon =

Genus of corals

Lithophyllon is a genus of stony corals in the family Fungiidae.

== Species ==
The World Register of Marine Species currently lists the following species:

- Lithophyllon concinna (Verrill, 1864)
- Lithophyllon ranjithi Ditlev, 2003
- Lithophyllon repanda (Dana, 1846)
- Lithophyllon scabra (Döderlein, 1901)
- Lithophyllon spinifer (Claereboudt & Hoeksema, 1987)
- Lithophyllon undulatum Rehberg, 1892
