= Porites brighami =

Scientific classification
- Kingdom: Animalia
- Phylum: Cnidaria
- Subphylum: Anthozoa
- Class: Hexacorallia
- Order: Scleractinia
- Family: Poritidae
- Genus: Porites
- Species: P. brighami

Binomial name
- Porites brighami Vaughan, 1907

Porites brighami, also called Brigham's coral, is a coral in the family Poritidae native to Hawai'i, Johnston Atoll, and Midway Atoll.
