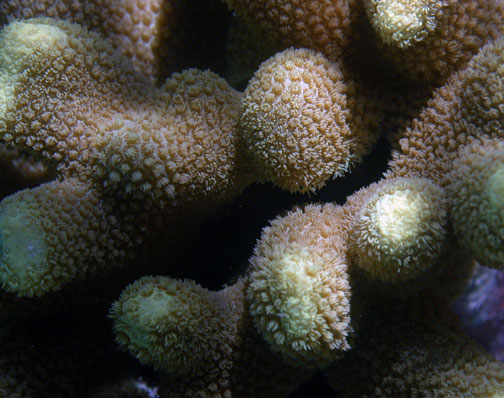

Conservation status
- Least Concern (IUCN 3.1)

Scientific classification
- Kingdom: Animalia
- Phylum: Cnidaria
- Subphylum: Anthozoa
- Class: Hexacorallia
- Order: Scleractinia
- Family: Poritidae
- Genus: Porites
- Species: P. cylindrica

Binomial name
- Porites cylindrica (Dana, 1846)

Synonyms
- List: Porites andrewsi Vaughan, 1918; Porites capricornis Rehberg, 1892; Porites galeata Nemenzo, 1955; Porites levis Dana, 1846; Porites planocella Nemenzo, 1955

= Porites cylindrica =

Species of coral

Porites cylindrica, commonly known as Hump coral, is a stony coral belonging to the subclass Hexacorallia in the class Anthozoa. Hexacorallia differ from other subclasses in that they have six or fewer axes of symmetry. Members of this class possess colonial polyps which can be reef-building, secreting a calcium carbonate skeleton. They are dominant in both inshore reefs and midshelf reefs.

== Description ==
P. cylindrica is a hermatypic (reef-building) coral that can grow to a few square meters wide and form micro-atolls. They are typically cream colored, yellow, blue, pale brown or green. Like all stony corals, P. cylindrica consists of very small polyps (1-3mm) that secrete calcium carbonate, with which they build a skeleton. Over time, entire colonies of reef-building corals can grow large, (weighing several tons), and create structural habitats. They are a branching coral, which are characterized by having numerous branches, some with secondary branches, growing in different directions. These types of corals tend to grow faster, allowing them to better find favorable microenvironments than corals with slower growth forms. However, their branching growth form also means that they are more vulnerable to breakage and injury.

== Distribution and habitat ==
P. cylindrica is common to abundant in shallow water areas 1–11 meters deep. They have also been observed 20 meters below surface waters. P. Cylindrica is found in back reefs and lagoons located in the waters of the oceanic West Pacific, Australia, the South China Sea, Japan, South-east Asia and the Indian Ocean.

== Biology ==
Porites cylindrica is a gonochoric coral species, featuring distinct male and female colonies, releasing sperm and egg respectively, as opposed to releasing sperm-egg bundles. Like all shallow-dwelling corals, P. cylindrica gametes are buoyant, and float to the surface of the water to merge. The brooding coral internally fertilizes its eggs, which contain the algae zooxanthellae evenly distributed within, allowing the new coral larvae to be born having already established a relationship with their symbiotic algal partners. The larvae then settle on hard substrate, where they develop into a coral polyp. Once fully developed, the coral polyp replicates itself through budding, dividing into two genetically identical polyps and growing in size and number whilst secreting calcium carbonate in order to form the coral's skeleton, eventually forming into a proper coral colony. However, P. cylindrica relies primarily on asexual reproduction through fragmentation, with new corals growing and developing from pieces of coral broken off from a "parent" coral. Once settled on hard substrate, the polyps making up the broken coral grow and develop naturally and eventually mature into a coral colony that is genetically identical to the parent.

P. cylindrica, like all corals, is sessile, capturing food particles that are suspended in the water column. They build fields of branching colonies, split into populations of males and females, and grow branches resembling fingers measuring about half an inch thick, typically in a light brown or dark green hue. The coral obtains its nutrients through its mutualistic relationship with the algae zooxanthellae, which acts as the cornerstone for its ecological role. Zooxanthellae, a photosynthetic dinoflagellate, is able to obtain its nutrients from the sun through photosynthesis, turning light energy into chemical energy stored in the form of carbohydrates, which it passes on to the coral polyps it inhabits. As with most shallow coral holobionts, P. cylindrica obtains the rest of its necessary nutrients, such as nitrogen, from detritus caught by the current, and the transfer of energy and nutrients through waste and decomposition from organisms higher up the food chain, like fish and marine mammals.

== Ecological role ==
P. cylindrica, as a reef-building coral, assists in providing key reef habitats for many species of fish, invertebrates, plants, sea turtles, birds, and marine mammals. Shallow reef ecosystems also provide coastlines with protection against storms and erosion. They are also economically important, offering a source of food and recreational activities such as fishing, diving, and snorkeling. P. cylindrica is an ideal species for coral rehabilitation efforts because they are able to tolerate environmental extremes and successfully disperse via fragmentation.

== Threats ==
P. cylindrica is susceptible to many changes in their surrounding environments, which may pose a threat to its well being and survival. To begin, as carbon dioxide becomes increasingly prevalent in our atmosphere, P. cylindrica struggles to adapt. When exposed to elevated levels of carbon dioxide, their rates of respiration and photosynthesis experience a significant decrease. Additionally, zooxanthellae densities decline with harmful environmental changes. Zooxanthellae are important members of the coral holobiont, contributing to the construction of the coral's calcium-carbonate skeleton and assisting in health maintenance. As sea water temperatures continue to rise, zooxanthellae struggle to adapt, often resulting in coral bleaching. Sea water temperatures above 34 °C pose risks to zooxanthellae populations, which in turn cause the coral to become increasingly susceptible to disease and death. The IUCN Red list of Threatened Species classified P. cylindrica as Near Threatened on January 3, 2008.
