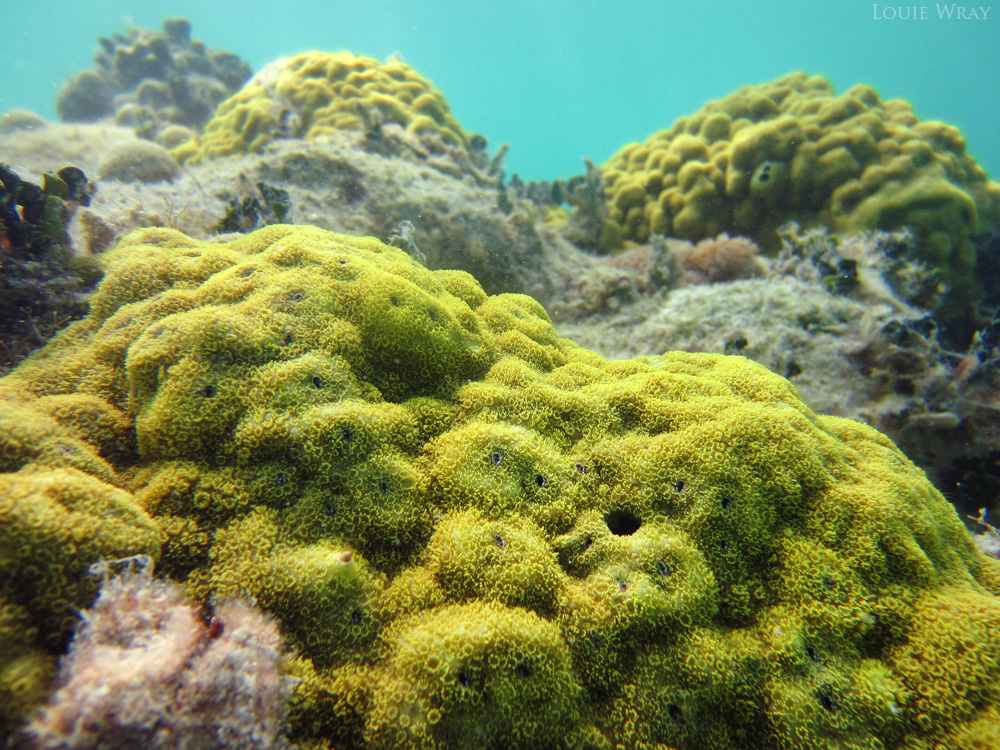
- Porites sp.

Scientific classification
- Kingdom: Animalia
- Phylum: Cnidaria
- Subphylum: Anthozoa
- Class: Hexacorallia
- Order: Scleractinia
- Family: Poritidae
- Genus: Porites; Link, 1807

Species
- See text

Synonyms
- List: Cosmoporites Duchassaing & Michelotti, 1860; Napopora Quelch, 1884; Neoporites Duchassaing & Michelotti, 1860; Synaraea Verrill, 1864

= Porites =

Genus of corals

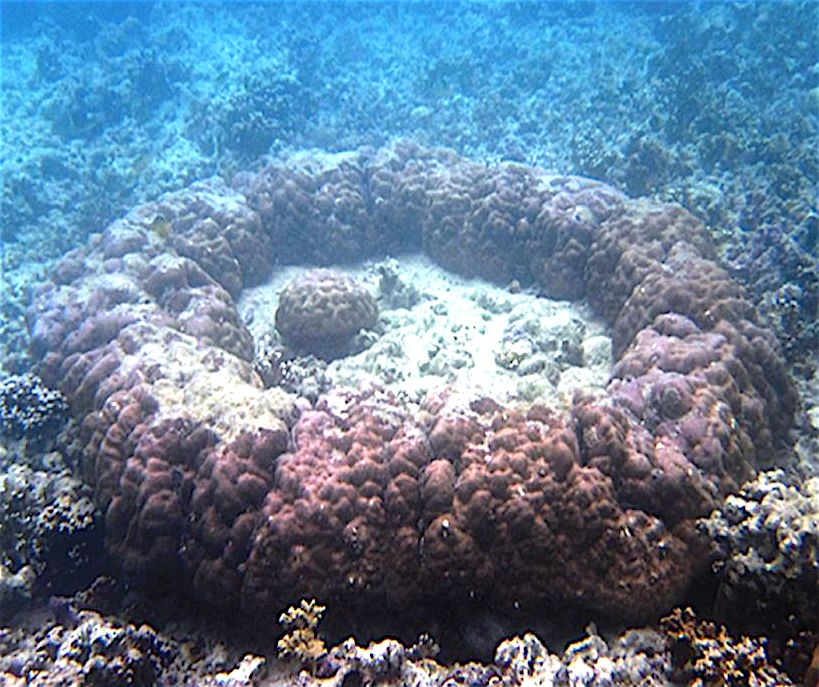
In intertidal reef-flat environments, massive Porites form characteristic microatoll formations, with living tissues around the perimeter, and dead skeleton on the exposed upper surface. Microatoll growth is predominantly lateral, as vertical growth is limited by a lack of accommodation space.

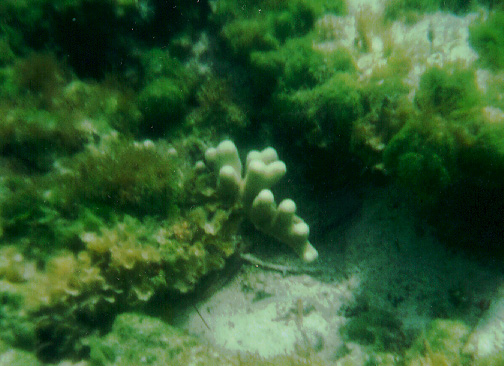
Small colony of Porites porites

Porites is a genus of stony coral; they are small polyp stony (SPS) corals. (Also referred to as finger coral or hump coral) They are characterised by a finger-like morphology. Members of this genus have widely spaced calices, a well-developed wall reticulum and are bilaterally symmetrical. Porites, particularly Porites lutea, often form microatolls. Corals of the genus Porites also often serve as hosts for Christmas tree worms (Spirobranchus giganteus).

== Aquarium trade ==
Specimens of Porites are sometimes available for purchase in the aquarium trade. Due to the strict water quality, lighting and dietary requirements, keeping Porites in captivity is very difficult.

Most Porites that are collected have Christmas tree worms (Spirobranchus giganteus) that bore into the coral, serving as additional aesthetic livestock. These particular Porites specimens are called "christmas tree worm rocks" or "christmas tree worm coral".

== Paleoclimatology ==
Porites corals have been shown to be accurate and precise recorders of past marine surface conditions. Measurements of the oxygen isotopic composition of the aragonitic skeleton of coral specimens indicate the sea-surface temperature conditions and the oxygen isotopic composition of the seawater at the time of growth. The oxygen isotopic composition of seawater can indicate the precipitation/evaporation balance because oxygen atoms of the more abundant mass 16 will preferentially evaporate before the more rare mass 18 oxygen. The relationship between temperature, precipitation, and the oxygen isotopic composition of Porites corals is important for reconstructing past climates, and associated large-scale patterns such as the El-Nino Southern Oscillation, the Intertropical Convergence Zone, and the mean state of the climate system.

== Ecology and biogeography ==
Corals in the genus Porites are found in reefs throughout the world. It is a dominant taxon on the Pandora platform of the Great Barrier Reef. Potts et al. (1985) identified 7 dominant species: P. lobata, P. solida, P. lutea, P. australiensis, P. mayeri, P. murrayensis, and P. anae. The oldest of six colonies in this reef was approximately 700 years old, and was estimated to be growing at 10.3 mm per year.

Meyer and Schultz (1985) demonstrated that P. furcata has a mutualistic relationship with the schools of French and white grunts (Haemulon flavolineatum and H. plumierii) that rest in their heads during the day. The fish provide it with ammonium, nitrates, and phosphorus compounds. Coral heads with resting grunts experience significantly higher growth rates and nitrogen composition than those without.

Representatives of this genus are found in both the Indo-Pacific and Caribbean basins.

== Physiology ==
Some species in this genus demonstrate high levels of halotolerance. In the Gulf of Thailand P. lutea tolerates daily tidal shifts of 10-30‰ salinity. Moberg et al. (1997) determined that when the salinity declines, the symbiotic zooxanthellae decrease their photosynthesis rate as the coral contracts its polyps to protect them. The corals maintain their metabolic rate by temporarily switching to heterotrophy, consuming prey such as brine shrimp and other zooplankton.

Porites growth rates can be determined by examining annual rings in their skeleton. This method was used to determine that P. astreoides grows its skeleton about the central axis by approximately 3.67mm/year, calcifies at approximately 0.55g/cm^{2}/year, and increases density in this region of the body at approximately 1.69g/cm^{3}/year. Additionally, Meyer and Schultz (1985) reported that coral growth varies seasonally. They observed that P. furcata's growth rate peaked between May and August, which is summertime in their Caribbean habitat.

== Threats ==
Threats to corals in the genus Porites include predation, climate change, and anthropogenic pollution. When exposed to increased temperatures and copper, P. cylindrica slowed its rate of production. Additionally, the symbiotic zooxanthellae reduced their photosynthesis rate when exposed to both stressors.

Done and Potts (1992) observed that when settled, larvae in Porites are vulnerable to competition from other corals and predation from sea urchins. Additionally, mortality likelihood increases following strong storms.

== Species ==
- Porites alveolata Milne Edwards, 1860
- †Porites amplectans Felix, 1921
- Porites annae Crossland, 1952
- †Porites anguillensis Vaughan, 1919
- Porites aranetai Nemenzo, 1955
- Porites arnaudi Reyes-Bonilla & Carricart-Ganivet, 2000
- Porites astreoides Lamarck, 1816
- Porites attenuata Nemenzo, 1955
- Porites australiensis Vaughan, 1918
- Porites baueri Squires, 1959
- Porites branneri Rathbun, 1887
- Porites brighami Vaughan, 1907
- Porites cocosensis Wells, 1950
- Porites colonensis Zlatarski, 1990
- Porites columnaris Klunzinger, 1879
- Porites compressa Dana, 1846
- Porites cribripora Dana, 1846
- Porites cumulatus Nemenzo, 1955
- Porites cylindrica Dana, 1846
- Porites decasepta Clareboudt, 2006
- Porites deformis Nemenzo, 1955
- Porites densa Vaughan, 1918
- Porites desilveri Veron, 2000
- Porites divaricata LeSueur, 1821
- Porites echinulata Klunzinger, 1879
- Porites eridani Umbgrove, 1940
- Porites evermanni Vaughan, 1907
- Porites exserta Pillai, 1967
- Porites flavus Veron, 2000
- Porites fontanesii Benzoni & Stefani, 2012
- Porites fragosa Dana, 1846
- Porites furcata Lamarck, 1816
- Porites gaimardi Milne Edwards & Haime, 1851
- Porites harrisoni Veron, 2000
- Porites hawaiiensis Vaughan, 1907
- Porites heronensis Veron, 1985
- Porites horizontalata Hoffmeister, 1925
- †Porites indica Duncan, 1880
- Porites latistellata Quelch, 1886
- Porites lichen Dana, 1846
- Porites lobata Dana, 1846
- Porites lutea Quoy & Gaimard, 1833
- †Porites macdonaldi Vaughan, 1919
- Porites mannarensis Pillai, 1967
- Porites mayeri Vaughan, 1918
- Porites minicoiensis Pillai, 1967
- Porites monticulosa Dana, 1846
- Porites murrayensis Vaughan, 1918
- Porites myrmidonensis Veron, 1985
- Porites napopora Veron, 2000
- Porites negrosensis Veron, 1990
- Porites nigrescens Dana, 1846
- Porites nodifera Klunzinger, 1879
- Porites okinawensis Veron, 1990
- Porites ornata Nemenzo, 1971
- Porites palmata Dana, 1846
- Porites panamensis Verrill, 1866
- †Porites pellegrinii Duncan, 1880
- Porites porites Pallas, 1766
- †Porites portoricensis Vaughan, 1919
- Porites profundus Rehberg, 1892
- Porites pukoensis Vaughan, 1907
- Porites randalli Forsman & Birkeland, 2009
- †Porites reussiana Ducan & Wall, 1865
- Porites rugosa Fenner & Veron, 2000
- Porites rus Forskål, 1775
- Porites sillimaniani Nemenzo, 1976
- Porites solida Forskål, 1775
- Porites somaliensis Gravier, 1910
- Porites stephensoni Crossland, 1952
- Porites superfusa Gardiner, 1898
- †Porites superposita Duncan, 1880
- Porites sverdrupi Durham, 1947
- †Porites trinitatis Vaughan in Vaughan and Hoffmeister, 1926
- Porites tuberculosa Veron, 2000
- Porites vaughani Crossland, 1952
- †Porites waylandi Foster, 1986
