= Stylaraea =

Conservation status
- Least Concern (IUCN 3.1)

Scientific classification
- Kingdom: Animalia
- Phylum: Cnidaria
- Subphylum: Anthozoa
- Class: Hexacorallia
- Order: Scleractinia
- Family: Poritidae
- Genus: Stylaraea; Milne-Edwards & Haime, 1851
- Species: S. punctata

Binomial name
- Stylaraea punctata (Linnaeus, 1758)

Synonyms
- (Species): Madrepora punctata Linnaeus, 1758; Porites punctata (Linnaeus, 1758)

Genus of corals

Stylaraea is a genus of marine stony corals in the family Poritidae. It is a monotypic genus and the only species is Stylaraea punctata. This coral is native to shallow tidal pools in tropical parts of the Indian and Pacific Oceans.

== Description ==
Stylaraea punctata is probably the smallest of the zooxanthellate corals, being circular, encrusting, and usually less than 1 cm (0.4 in) in diameter. The polyps are flower-like and less than 1 mm (0.04 in) across, each having twelve tentacles. The cup-shaped corallites in which they sit have a solid central columella and poorly-developed calcareous septa in two whorls of six. The colouring of this coral is usually pale brown or purple with white septa and columella.

== Distribution and habitat ==
Stylaraea punctata is known from widely separated locations in the tropical Indo-Pacific region including East Africa, the Seychelles, Indonesia, the Great Barrier Reef and Guam. It is possible that it is present in other locations as it is easily overlooked. Its habitat is shallow tidal pools seldom more than half a metre deep, just above the sediment and hidden under dead pieces of coral or under massive coralline algae. In these locations it suffers little competition from other coral species.

== Status ==
The IUCN lists Stylaraea punctata as "Data deficient" as there is insufficient evidence to judge its status and whether any conservation measures are required. Like other corals, this species is likely to be affected by such factors as a rise in sea temperature and ocean acidification due to climate change, and as a result be more susceptible to coral diseases.
