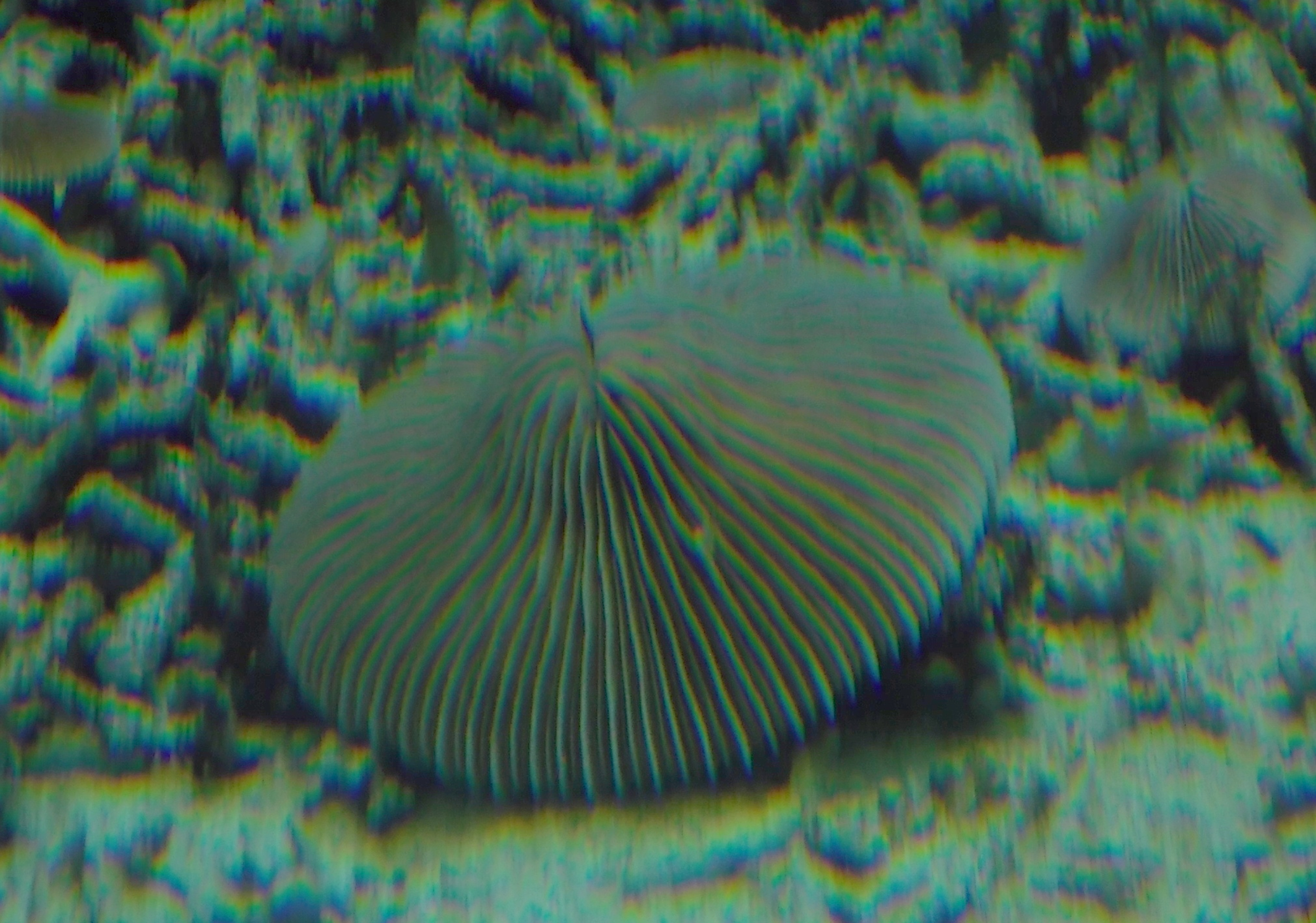

Conservation status
- Endangered (IUCN 3.1)

Scientific classification
- Kingdom: Animalia
- Phylum: Cnidaria
- Subphylum: Anthozoa
- Class: Hexacorallia
- Order: Scleractinia
- Family: Fungiidae
- Genus: Lithophyllon
- Species: L. repanda

Binomial name
- Lithophyllon repanda (Dana, 1846)

Synonyms
- List: Fungia discus Dana, 1846; Fungia integra Dana, 1846; Fungia linnaei Milne Edwards & Haime, 1851; Fungia repanda Dana, 1846; Fungia samboangensis Vaughan, 1906

= Lithophyllon repanda =

Species of coral

Lithophyllon repanda is a species of mushroom or disc coral in the family Fungiidae. This species is able to move to another location on occasion. The International Union for Conservation of Nature (IUCN) rated it as a least-concern species, and it was originally described by James Dwight Dana in 1846. It occurs at depths of 1 to 30 metres (3 ft 3 in to 98 ft 5 in).

== Description ==
L. repanda has thick and circular polyps with diameters of up to 300 millimetres (12 in), which are either arched or flat. Its septa are roughly equal and the septal teeth are visible. Its tentacles extend during the day and are pale in colour, but the species is without tentacular lobes. It has granular costal spines and the species is brown in colour. It reaches diameters of up to 23.5 centimetres (9.3 in).

== Distribution ==
It is found in the Gulf of Aden, the Red Sea, the southwestern and northern Indian Ocean, eastern Africa, northern, eastern, and western Australia, the East China Sea, Japan, and the western and central Pacific Ocean. It is a common species and no population figures are available, but its population is believed to be declining in line with the global decline in coral reefs. It is threatened by coral disease, climate change, bleaching, predators, human activity, fishing, and parasites. A 1991 study discovered that 75% of observed specimens were bleached due to rising sea temperatures. It is rated as a least-concern species by the IUCN and is listed under CITES Appendix II. It is found at depths of between 1 and 30 metres (3 ft 3 in and 98 ft 5 in) on flats and slopes of reefs.

== Taxonomy ==
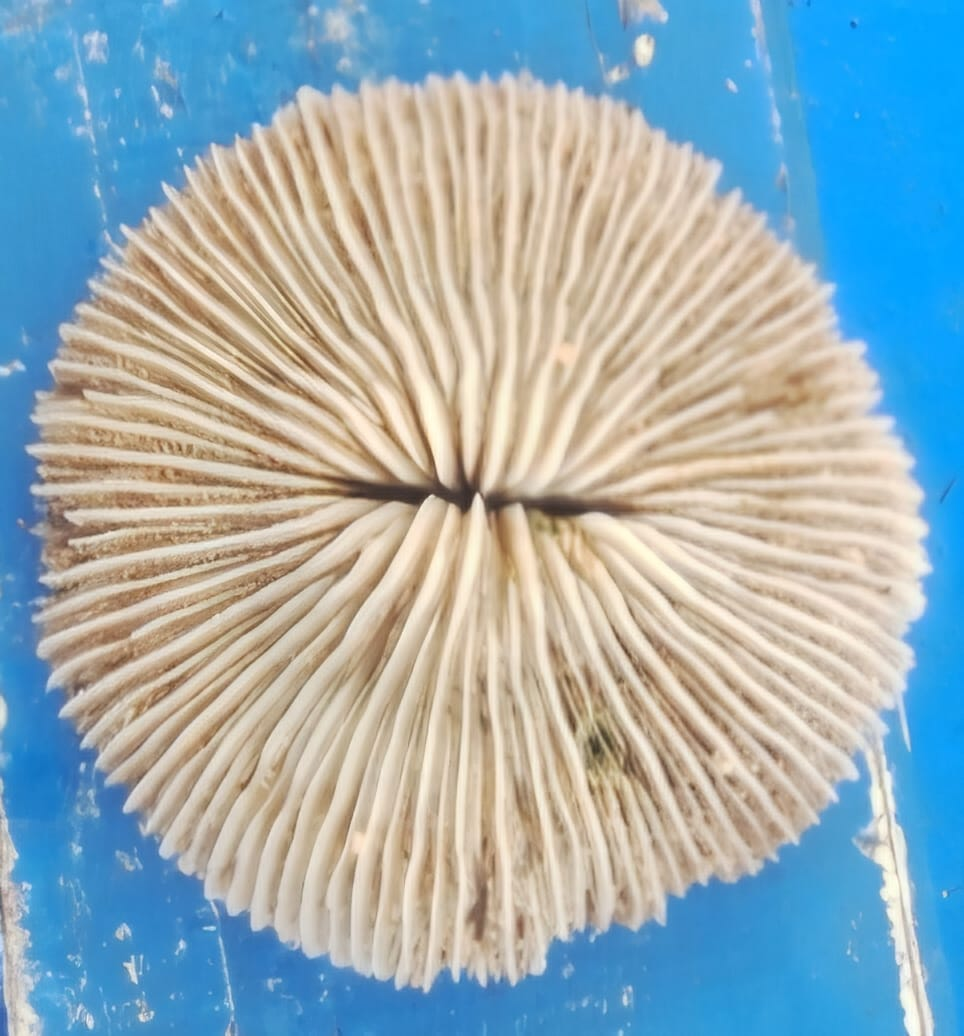
Lithophyllon repanda from the Philippines

It was originally described as Fungia repanda by Dana in 1846.
