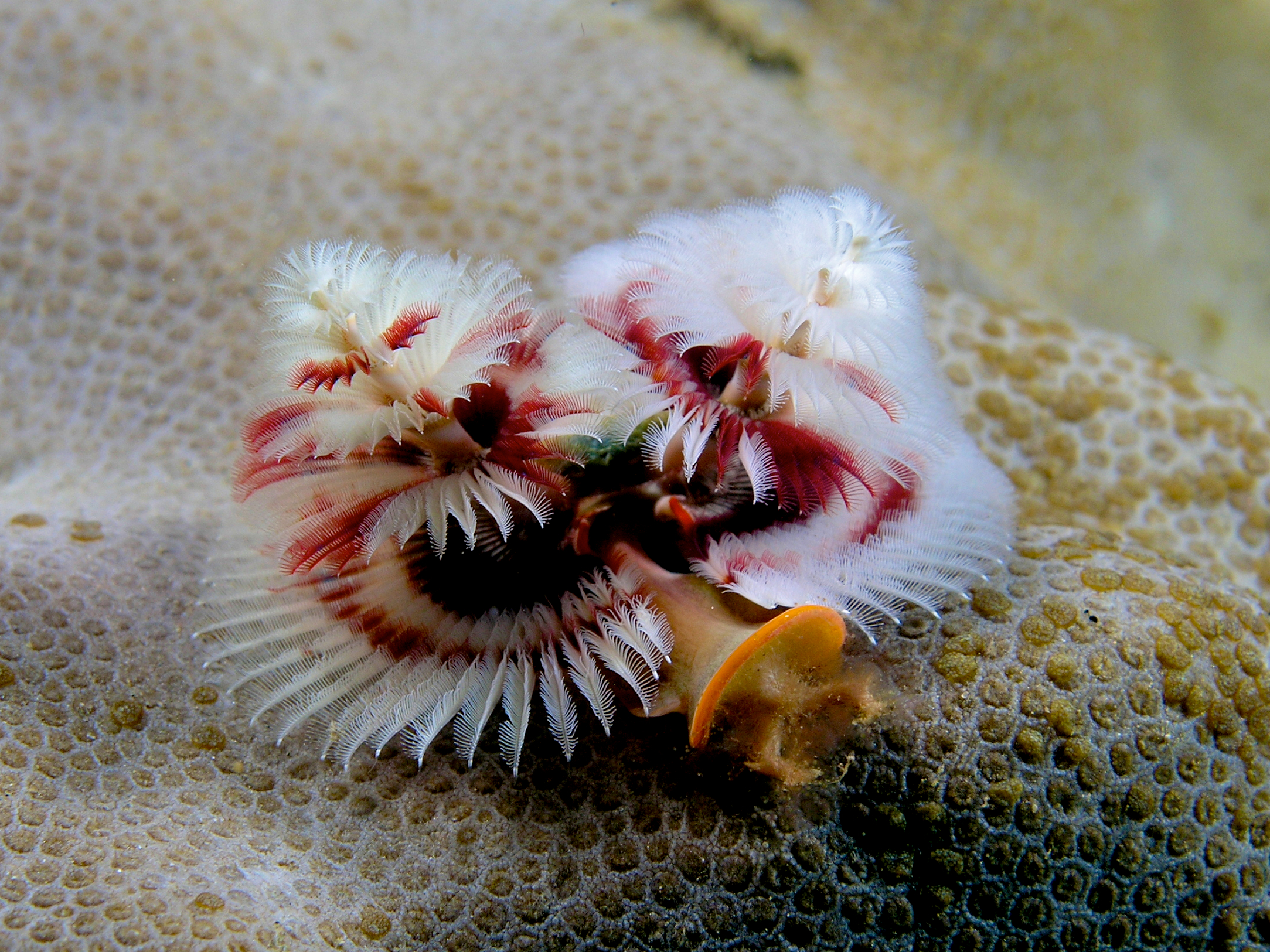
- S. giganteus on Porites

Scientific classification
- Kingdom: Animalia
- Phylum: Annelida
- Clade: Pleistoannelida
- Clade: Sedentaria
- Order: Sabellida
- Family: Serpulidae
- Genus: Spirobranchus
- Species: S. giganteus

Binomial name
- Spirobranchus giganteus (Pallas, 1766)

= Spirobranchus giganteus =

Christmas tree worm

Species of marine tube worm

Spirobranchus giganteus, commonly known as the Christmas tree worm, is a polychaete worm belonging to the family Serpulidae building calcareous tubes. The S. giganteus lives in coral reefs in the Caribbean.

== Anatomy and morphology ==
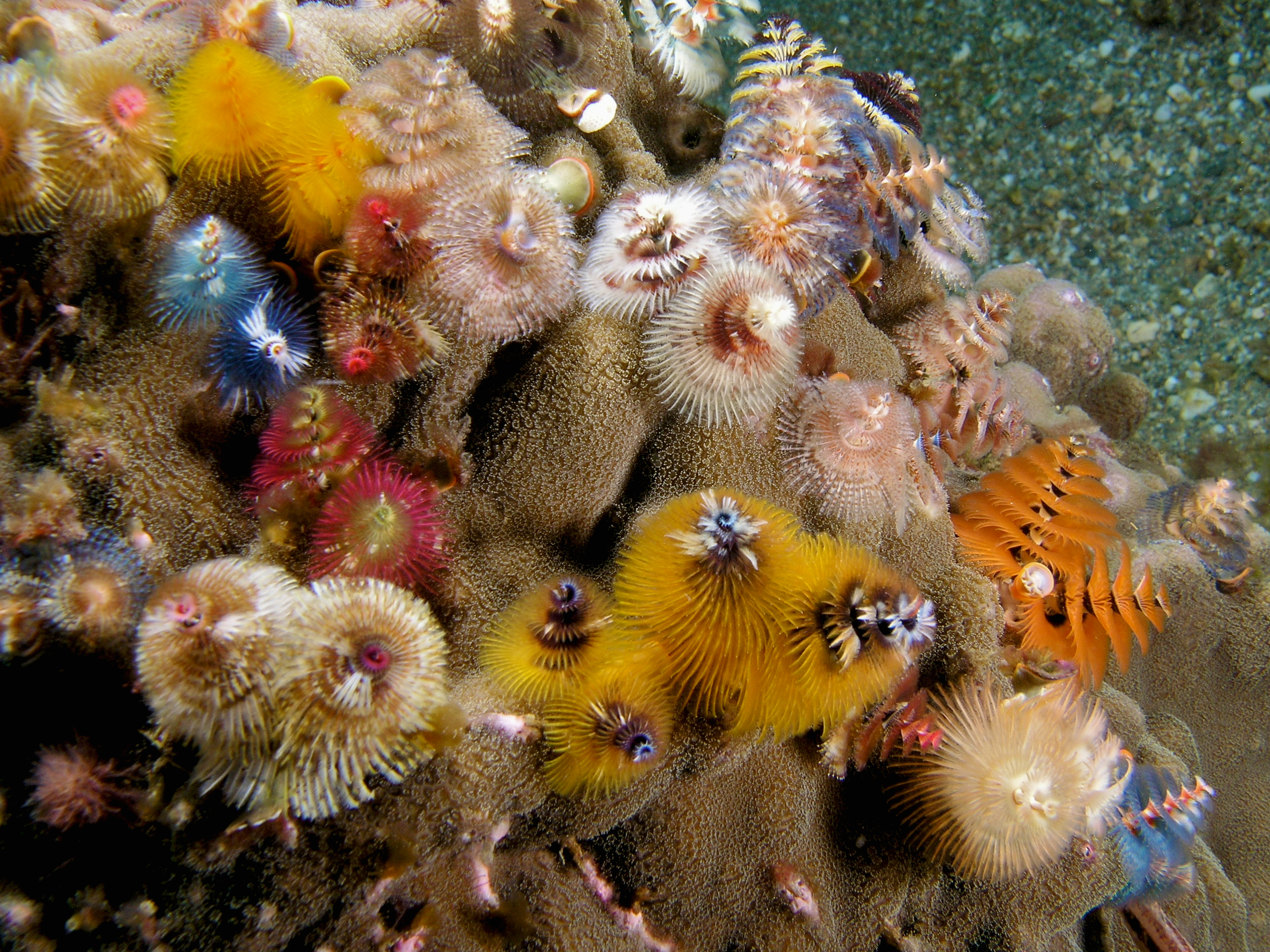
Assortment of worms

Both its common and Latin names refer to the two chromatically hued spiral structures, the most common feature seen by divers. The multicolored spirals are highly derived structures for feeding and respiration.

Spirobranchus giganteus is similar to most tube-building polychaetes. It has a tubular, segmented body of an approximate length of 3.8 cm (1.5 in) covered with chaetae, small appendages that aid the worm's mobility. Because it does not move outside its tube, this worm does not have any specialized appendages for movement or swimming.

The worms' most distinct features are two "crowns" shaped like Christmas trees. These are highly modified prostomial palps, which are specialized mouth appendages. Each spiral is composed of feather-like tentacles called radioles, which are heavily ciliated and cause any prey trapped in them to be transported to the worm's mouth. While they are primarily feeding structures, S. giganteus also uses its radioles for respiration; hence, the structures commonly are called "gills".

One major difference between Christmas tree worms and other Sabellida fan worms is that the latter do not have any specialized body structures to plug their tube holes when they withdraw into them. Spirobranchus giganteus, like many other members of its family, possesses a modified radiole that usually bears a plug called the operculum, that it uses to secure its hole when withdrawn into its tube.

As an annelid, S. giganteus possesses a complete digestive system and has a well-developed closed circulatory system. Like other annelids, these worms possess well-developed nervous systems with a central brain and many supporting ganglia, including pedal ganglia, unique to the Polychaeta. Spirobranchus giganteus has a faster mitochondrial sequence evolution than other annelids because of its nucleotide composition and divergence of protein sequences. Like other polychaetes, S. giganteus excretes with fully developed nephridia. When they reproduce, they simply shed their gametes straight into the water where the eggs and spermatozoa become part of the zooplankton to be carried by the currents.

== Range and distribution ==
Spirobranchus giganteus occur from the Caribbean to the Indo-Pacific.

== Ecology ==
S. giganteus is commonly found embedded entirely in heads of massive corals, such as stony corals Porites and brain corals. Like members of its family, it can secrete a calcareous tube around its body. This tube serves as the worm's home and protection. Calcareous tube can reach up to 20 cm in length. They are usually deeply embedded in the coral skeleton. S. giganteus usually settles onto an existing head of living coral before secreting its tube, thereby increasing its level of protection as coral tissue overgrows the calcareous tube. When the worm retreats into its tube, the opening is shut using an operculum, which is further protected by sharp, antler-shaped spines.

As sedentary inhabitants of coral reefs, Christmas tree worms feed primarily by filter feeding. They use their brightly colored radioles to filter microorganisms from the water, which are then deposited straight into the worm's digestive tract.

Few organisms are known to feed on tube-borne polychaetes and S. giganteus is no exception. The relationship between S. giganteus and its host corals is still poorly understood, but occasionally the movement of the operculum can abrade the coral tissue, and that mortality of the coral tissue is enhanced when the worm's operculum hosts filamentous algae.

== Importance to humans ==
While the worm itself has no commercial fishery importance, it is of interest to marine aquarists and divers. The variously colored worm crowns make extremely popular underwater photographic subjects for sport divers. Many aquarists who have miniature reef aquaria purposely include heads of coral that S. giganteus specimens inhabit.

== Conservation status ==
As the species is widespread and relatively common, no conservation efforts focus on this species (or polychaetes in general). This species was thought to be exclusively found in coralheads, however they have also recently been described as epibionts on the giant clam species Tridacna squamosa in the Gulf of Thailand. The conservation status of the host species which it inhabits varies.

== Etymology and taxonomy ==
Spirobranchus essentially translates to "spiral branchia", referring to the worm's unique crown.

== Reproduction ==
There are both male and female Christmas tree worms, Spirobranchus giganteus. They reproduce by casting their eggs and sperm into the water. The eggs are fertilized in the water then develop into larvae that settle on coral heads and then burrow into the coral to form their burrows.

== Gallery ==
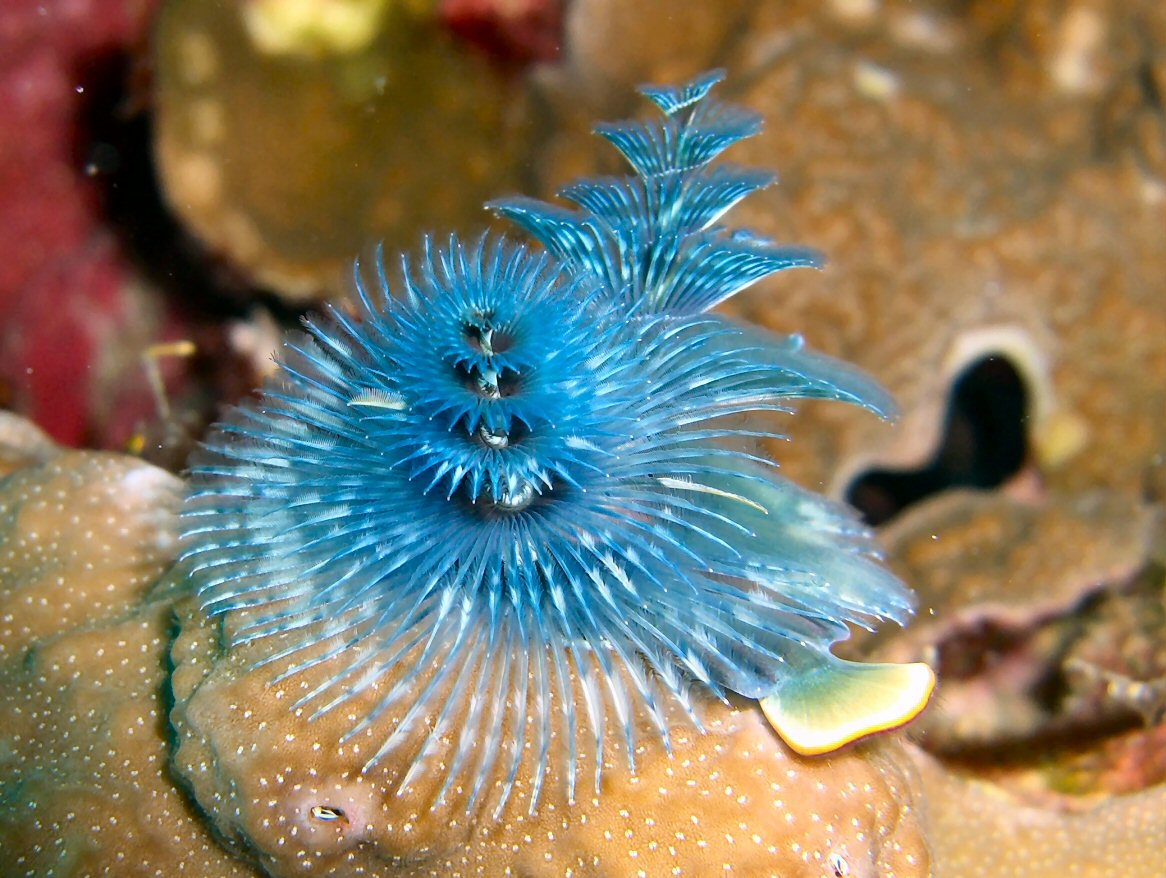
Christmas Tree worm in Thailand

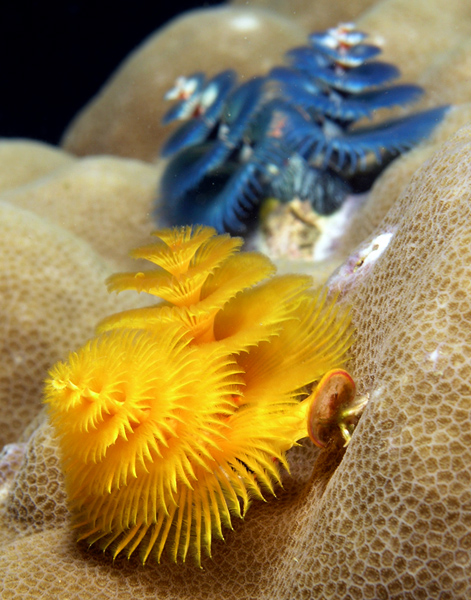
Christmas tree worms (Spirobranchus giganteus) from East Timor.

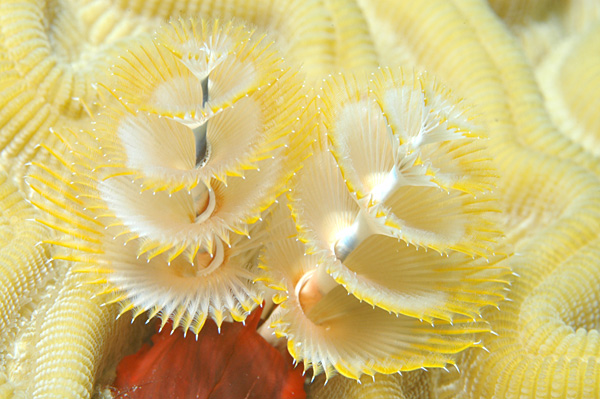
Spirobranchus giganteus embedded in a brain coral in a reef in Bonaire.

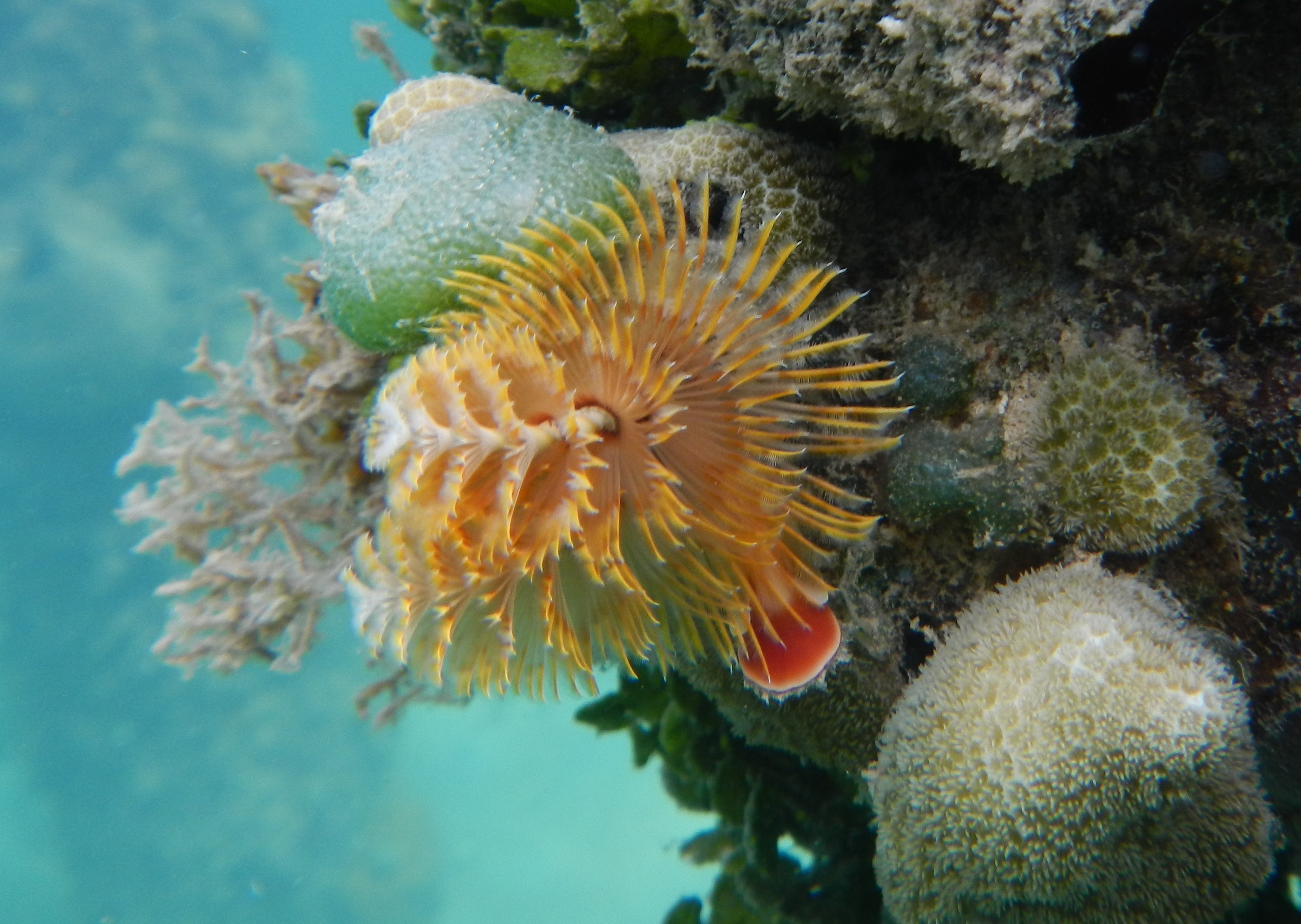
Spirobranchus giganteus, Vieques, Puerto Rico

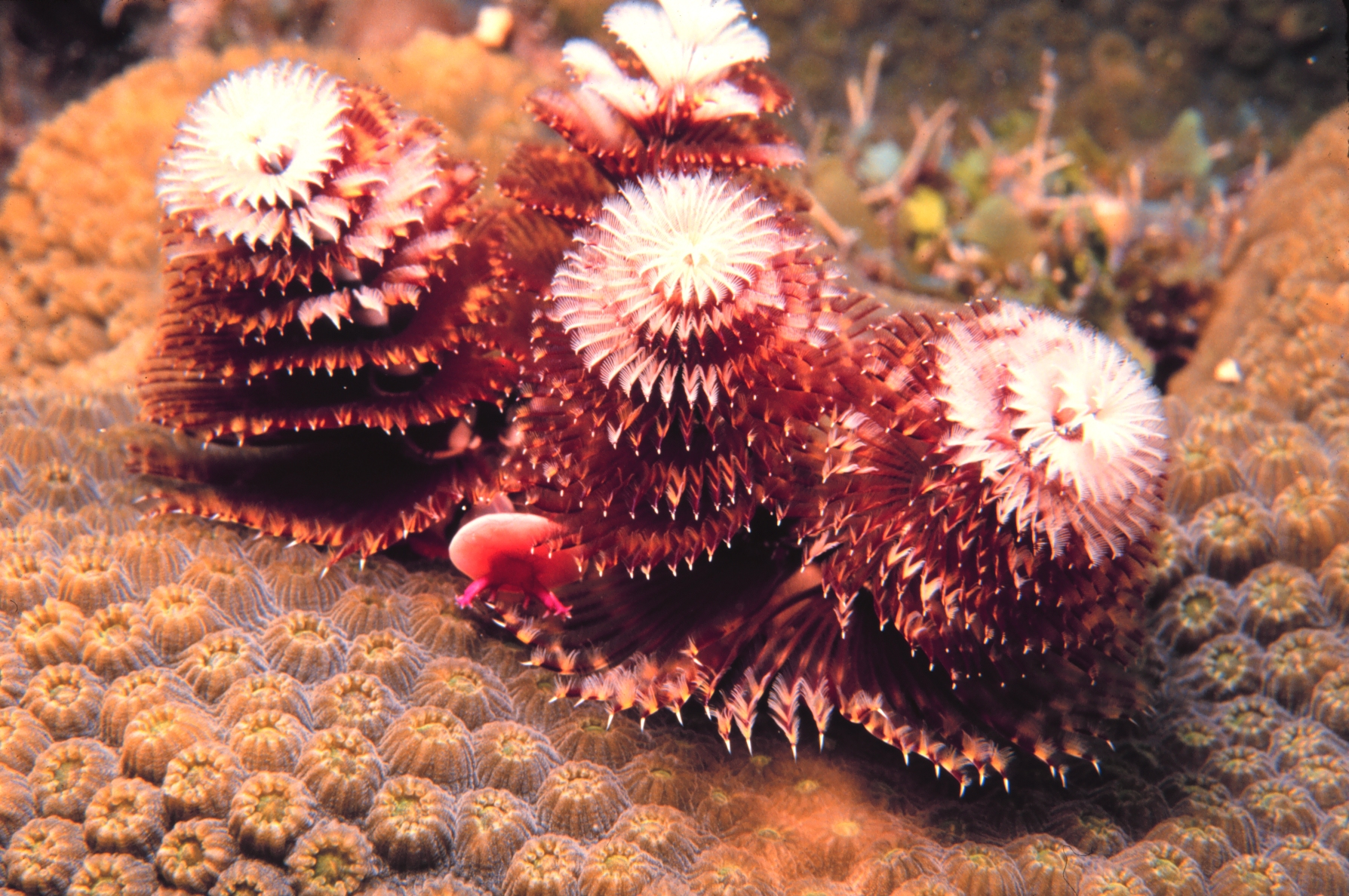
Elbow Reef, Florida.

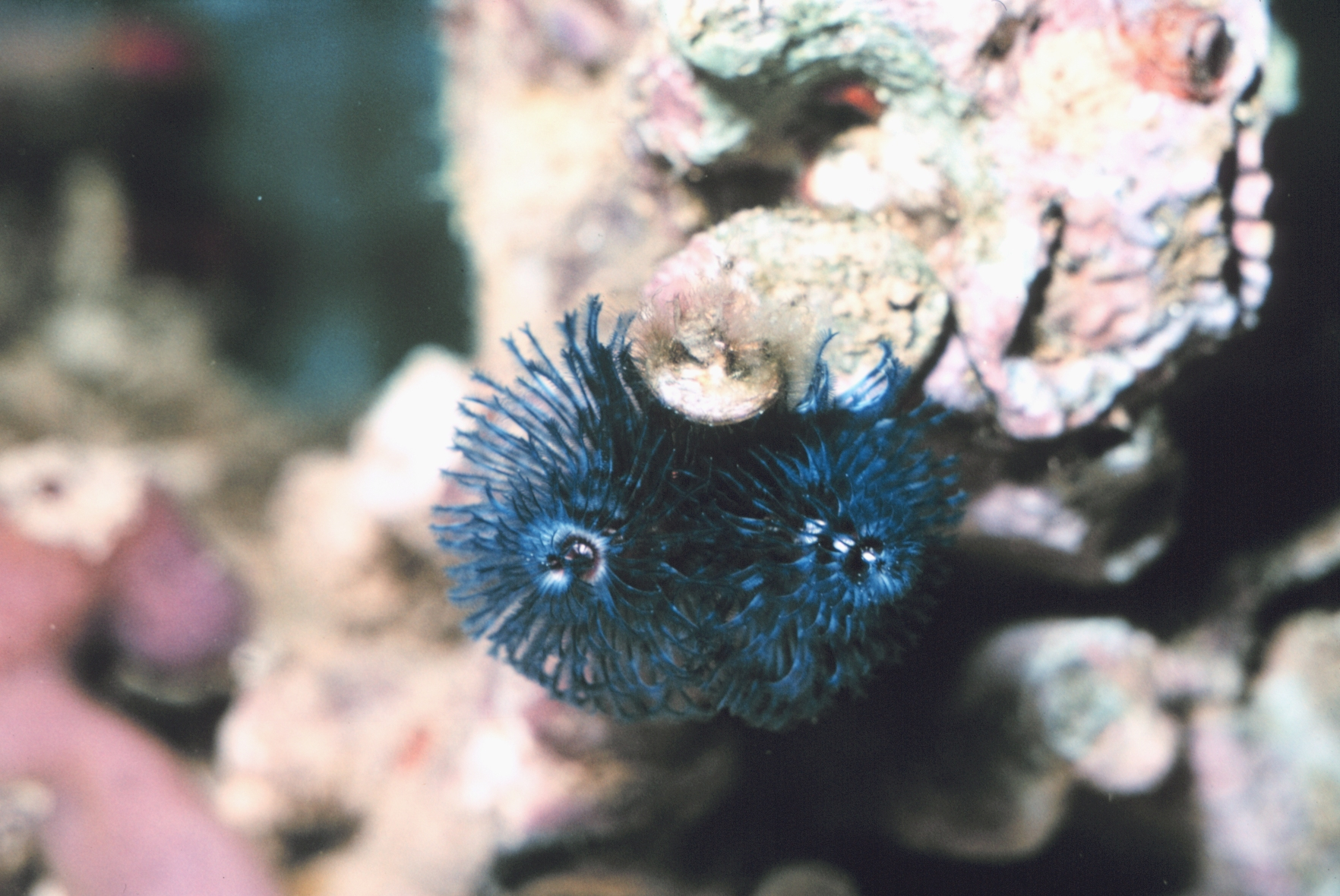
Hawaii.

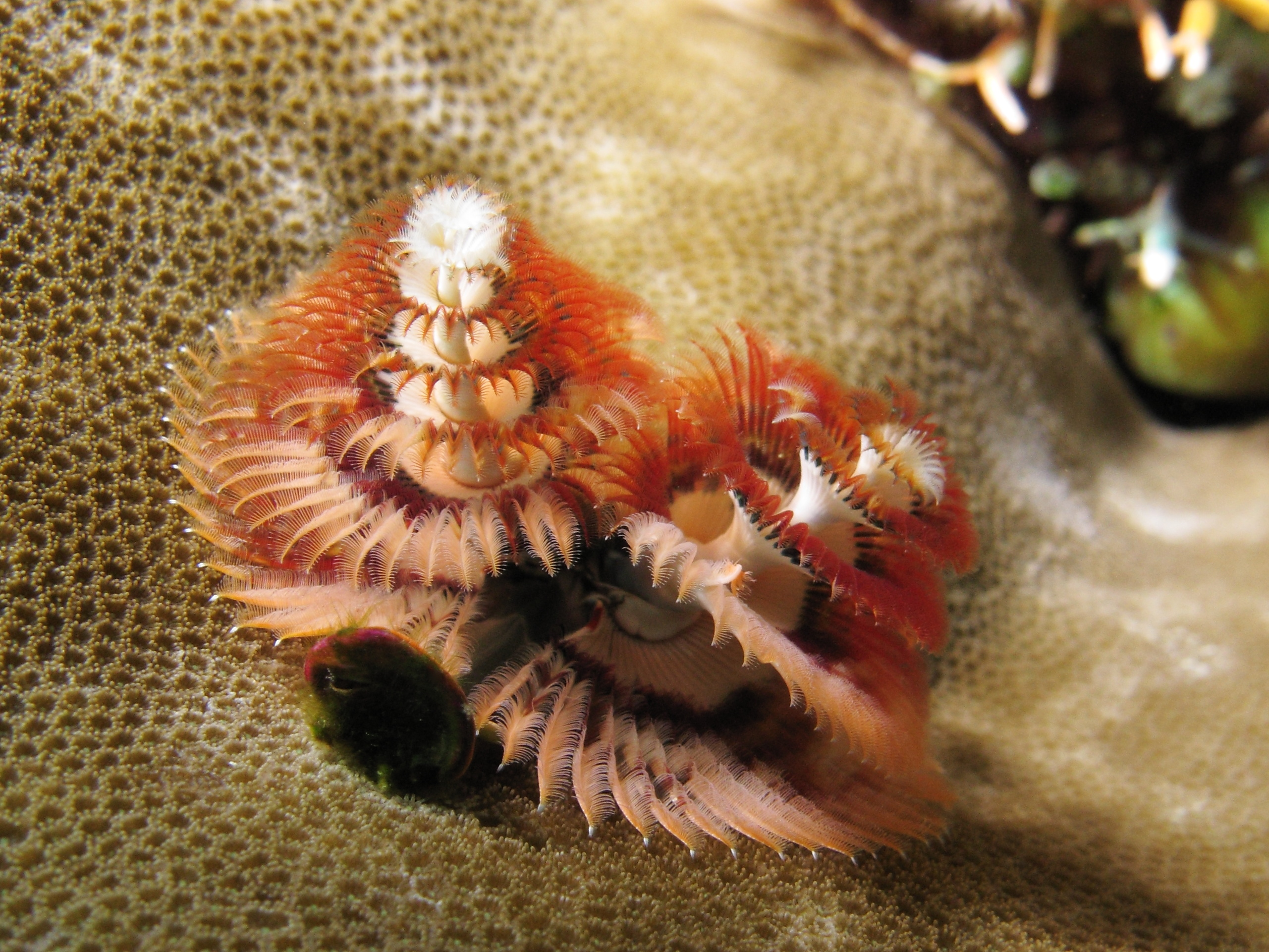
Gili Lawa Laut (near Komodo, Indonesia)

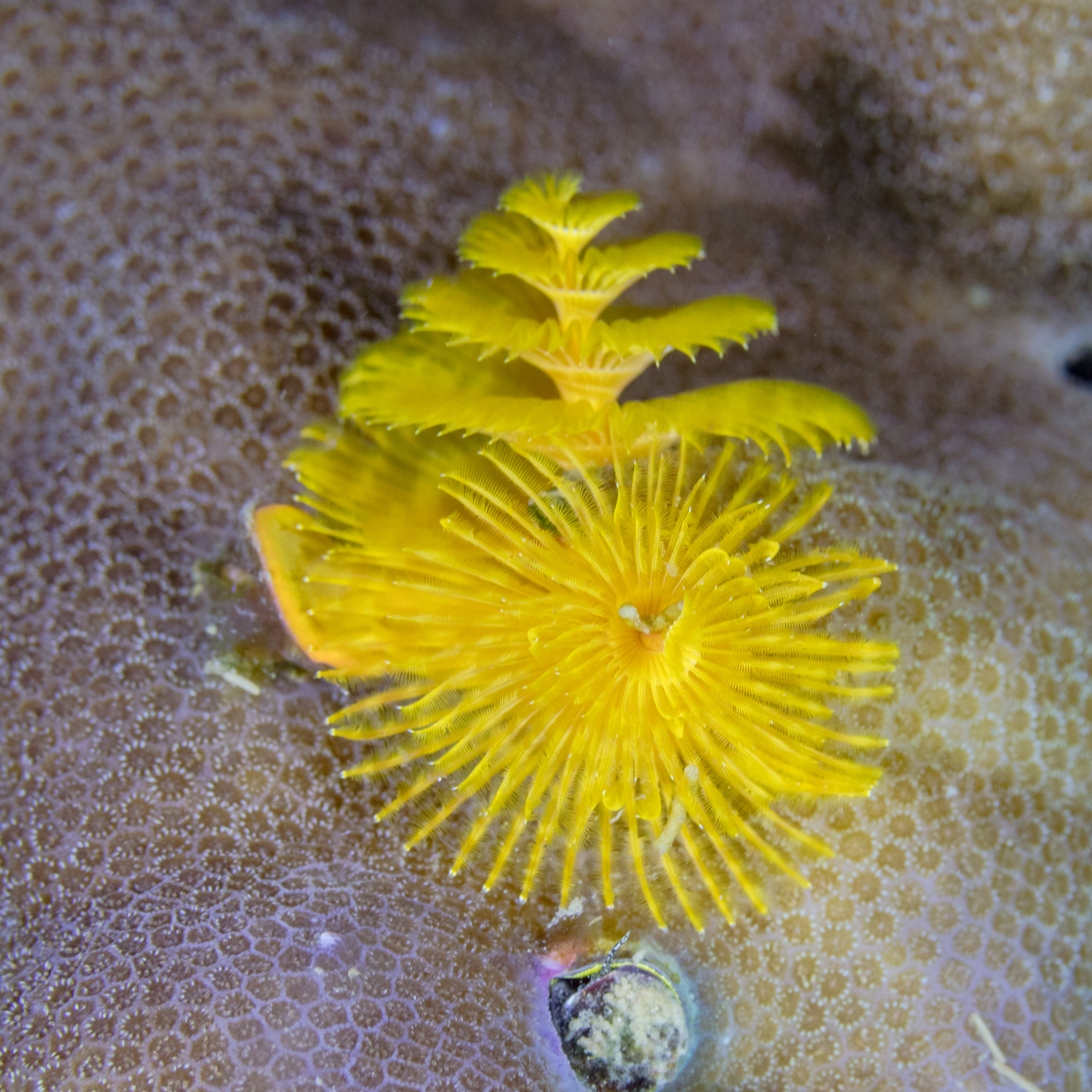
Spirobranchus giganteus, Anilao, Philippines

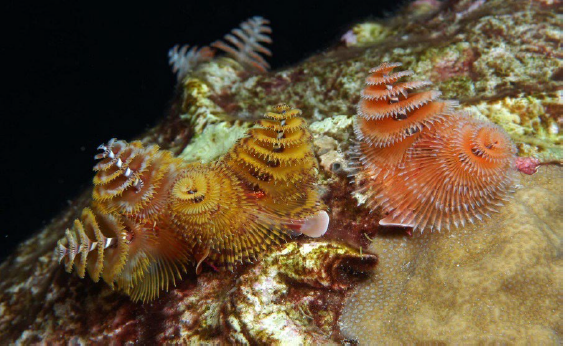
Christmas tree worms on a coral head in the Flower Garden Banks National Marine Sanctuary in the Gulf of Mexico.
