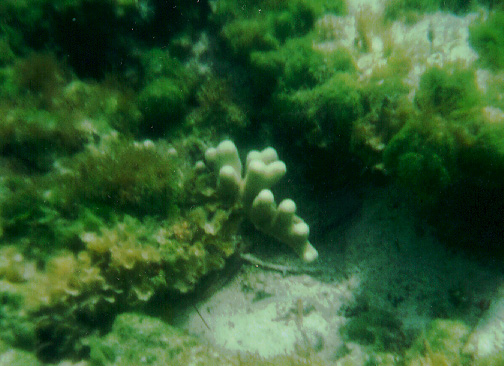
- In the Bahamas

Conservation status
- Least Concern (IUCN 3.1)

- Apparently Secure (NatureServe)

Scientific classification
- Kingdom: Animalia
- Phylum: Cnidaria
- Subphylum: Anthozoa
- Class: Hexacorallia
- Order: Scleractinia
- Family: Poritidae
- Genus: Porites
- Species: P. porites

Binomial name
- Porites porites (Pallas, 1766)

Synonyms
- Madrepora porites Pallas, 1766; Porites polymorphus Link, 1807

= Porites porites =

Species of coral

Porites porites, commonly known as hump coral or finger coral, is a species of stony coral in the genus Porites. It is found in the Caribbean Sea and western Atlantic Ocean and also along the coast of West Africa.

== Description ==
Porites porites forms irregular patches of short, finger-like lobes with blunt, slightly swollen tips. Sometimes these are densely packed but in other locations they are widely spaced. The lobes are up to 2.5 cm (1 in) wide which distinguishes this species from other members of the genus that have narrower lobes. They may be curved or hooked and grow in all directions. The colour is usually white or pale blueish-grey.

This species is known to be some of the oldest forms of life on earth due to the slow growth rate of the coral. The coral is formed from tiny polyps that attach together at the base of their skeletons and branch outward. Scientists believe that some Porites coral are up to 1,000 years old and can reach heights of eight metres (26 ft) and widths of up to five metres (16 ft).

== Distribution and habitat ==
Porites porites occurs throughout the Gulf of Mexico, the Caribbean Sea, the Bahamas and southern Florida and as far south as Venezuela. It is also found in shallow tropical seas off the west coast of Africa. It is found from low water mark down to a depth of about 20 metres (70 ft) and occurs on both fore reefs and back reefs where the water is not too turbid. It also occurs on the prop roots of mangroves and among seagrass (Thalassia spp.).

== Biology ==
Porites porites is a zooxanthellate coral, the tissues containing unicellular green algae living symbiotically within the cells. These are photosynthetic and use the carbon dioxide and waste materials produced by the coral, supplying oxygen and organic compounds in return. Unlike most stony corals, the polyps of Porites porites often extend their tentacles to feed in the daytime.

== Status ==
Porites porites is listed as being of least concern on the IUCN Red List of Threatened Species. This is because it is a common species throughout its range and the population seems stable. It is an adaptable species being found in a wide range of habitats and is not particularly susceptible to bleaching. It is prone to coral diseases but its chief threat is the loss of reef habitat through mechanical damage, violent storms, a rise in sea temperatures, ocean acidification, pollution, increased sedimentation and tourism.
