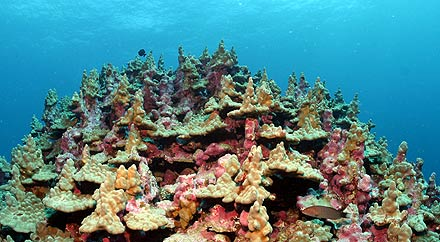

Conservation status
- Least Concern (IUCN 3.1)

Scientific classification
- Kingdom: Animalia
- Phylum: Cnidaria
- Subphylum: Anthozoa
- Class: Hexacorallia
- Order: Scleractinia
- Family: Poritidae
- Genus: Porites
- Species: P. lobata

Binomial name
- Porites lobata Dana, 1846

Synonyms
- List: Porites excavata Verrill, 1869; Porites globosa Nemenzo, 1976; Porites paschalensis Vaughan, 1906

= Porites lobata =

Species of coral

Porites lobata, known by the common name lobe coral, is a species of stony coral in the family Poritidae. It is found growing on coral reefs in tropical parts of the Indian and Pacific Oceans.

== Description ==
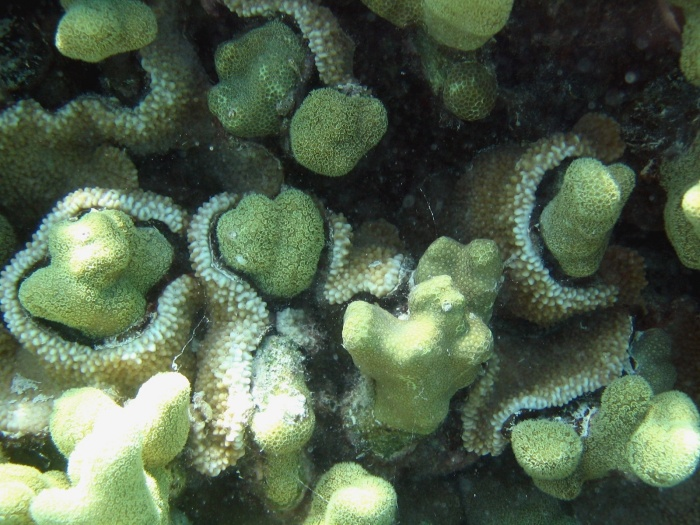
Rice coral (Montipora capitata) growing over Porites sp.

Porites lobata is a hermatypic or reef-building coral. It varies greatly in size and shape depending on its environment. On wave-exposed reef slopes it is encrusting whereas in calm water areas it can grow into large helmet-shaped or hemispherical hummocks up to 6 metres (20 ft) high and wide. Growth rates are very slow, sometimes being as little as 1 centimetre (0.39 in) per year, and this means that large corals are very old. The general colour is greenish, yellow or tan because of the zooxanthellae, single-celled microalgae, that live symbiotically within the tissues. These make organic nutrients available to the polyps through photosynthesis.

The corallites are very small and closely packed. They are joined directly to one another by fused but porous walls and have diagnostic skeletal characteristics that are only visible under the microscope. The septa are also fused. The polyps are 1 millimetre (0.04 in) in diameter and the coenosarc covering the skeleton is thin.

== Distribution ==
Porites lobata is a common species of coral and is found in the tropical parts of the Indian and Pacific Oceans. The range extends from East Africa, the Red Sea and the Gulf of Aden, through Indonesia and Australian waters to the Pacific coasts of Gulf of California and Central America. It is the most common coral species in Hawaii. It is often the dominant species on reef margins, in lagoons and on fringing reefs at depths down to 30 metres (98 ft). It occurs in a slightly deeper zone than cauliflower coral.

== Biology ==
Porites lobata is gonochoristic which means that individual colonies are either male or female. Gametes are liberated into the water column and the developing planula larvae drift with the currents as part of the zooplankton. These later settle, undergo metamorphosis and develop into polyps which found new colonies. Mortality is very high and very few recruits are found in the Eastern Pacific. Fragments of coral that become detached from the colony may also develop into new colonies. Breakup may happen as a result of wave damage or it may be due to the skeletal structure of the coral being weakened by the boring activities of date mussels (Lithophaga spp.) or the feeding activities of fish such as the stone triggerfish (Pseudobalistes naufragium).

== Ecology ==
Porites lobata forms part of the coral reef biome. Several fish species live among the lobes of the coral, some sheltering there and others, like the puffer fish (Arothron meleagris) grazing on the polyps. The snapping or pistol shrimp (Alpheus deuteropus) is a commensal and lives among the lobes where it may form grooves and tunnels.

== Threats ==
Porites lobata is one of the more resilient species of coral. A rise in sea temperature may kill the zooxanthellae and cause bleaching, however, it is more resistant to bleaching than many corals and if bleaching does occur, it often recovers. Tropical reefs in general are under threat from many causes. These include El Nino events, ocean acidification which tends to dissolve the coral skeleton, trawling which results in mechanical damage to reefs, and coral diseases which kill the polyps. Due to the lack of coloration, this coral is very rarely collected for use in the aquarium hobby.
