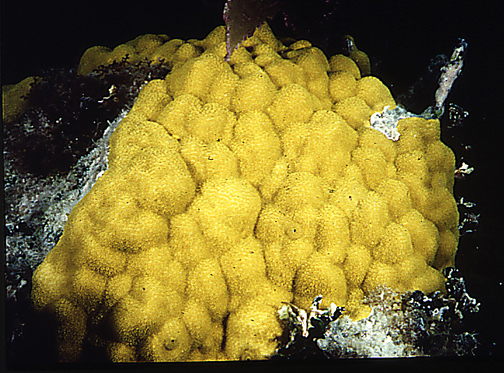
- Porities sp.

Scientific classification
- Kingdom: Animalia
- Phylum: Cnidaria
- Subphylum: Anthozoa
- Class: Hexacorallia
- Order: Scleractinia
- Family: Poritidae

Genera
- See text

= Poritidae =

Family of corals

Poritidae is a family of stony corals. Members of the family are colonial hermatypic (reef-building) corals. They are variable in size and form but most are massive, laminar or ramose as well as branching and encrusting. The corallites are compact with very little coenosteum covering the skeleton. The walls of the corallites and the septa are porous. J.E.N. Veron considers the family is not a natural grouping but is a miscellaneous collection of genera that do not fit well elsewhere.

== Genera ==
The World Register of Marine Species includes the following genera in the family:

- Bernardpora Kitano & Fukami, 2014
- Goniopora de Blainville, 1830 - 29 species. The polyps have 24 tentacles.
- Porites - 77 species.
- Stylaraea - Monotypic. The only species is Stylaraea punctata.
