= Indonesia–Monaco relations =

- Indonesia: Monaco

Indonesia–Monaco relations refer to foreign relations between the Republic of Indonesia and the Principality of Monaco. Due to the resemblance of the colors red and white on their flags, the Monégasque government asked Indonesia to modify its flag during the International Hydrographic Congress on 29 April 1952. Ultimately, Monaco and Indonesia came to an agreement by defining the proportions of their flags differently from one another. Monaco's is 4:5, while Indonesia's is 2:3. The two nations are members of the United Nations.

== History ==
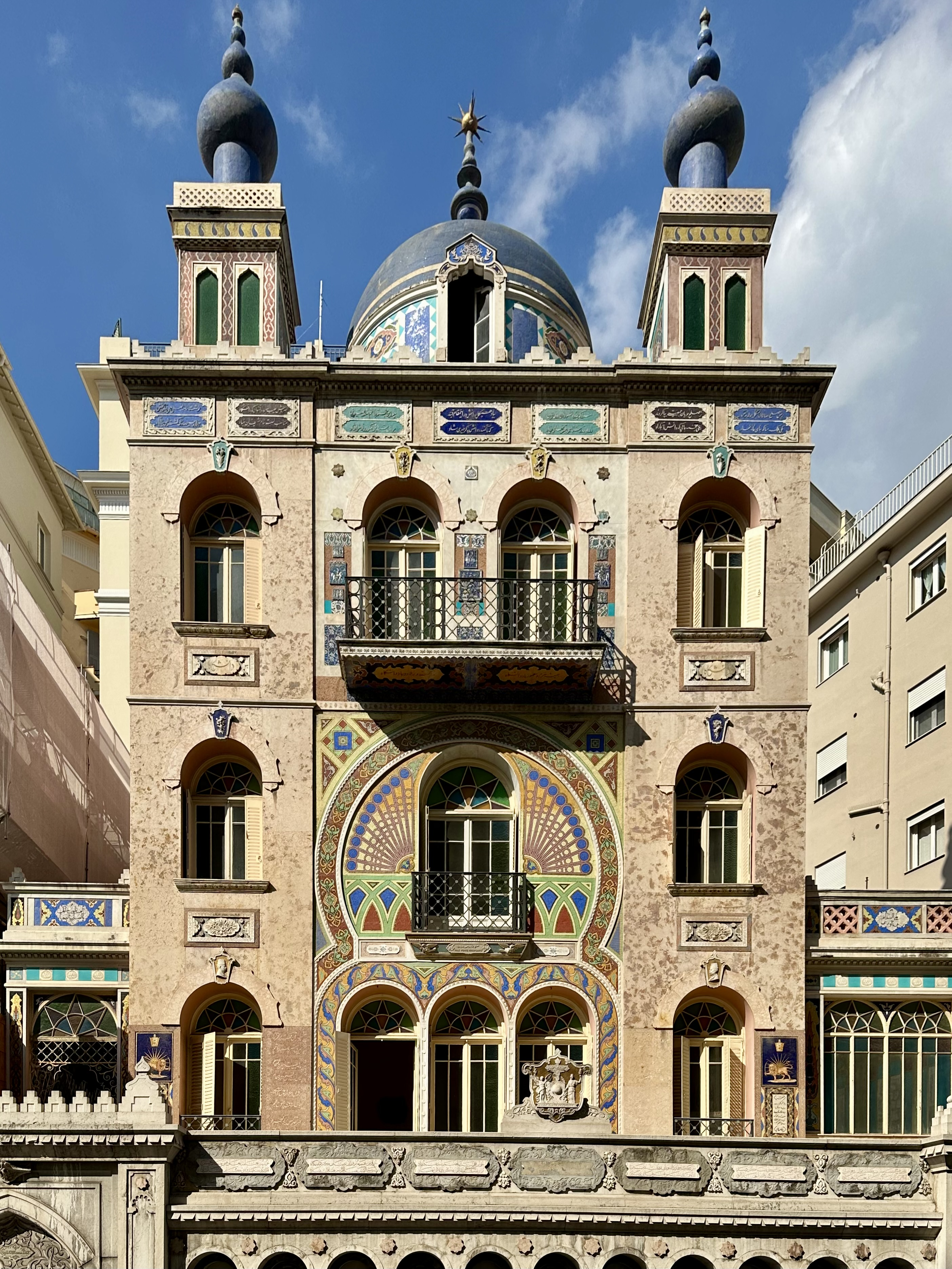
Villa Ispahan, location of Indonesia's honorary consulate in Monaco

Initially, because the colors of the flags of these two nations were similar, Monaco refused to acknowledge Indonesia's independence. Monaco claims that the ripping of the Dutch flag is what gave Indonesia's flag its red and white colors. Soon after, Monaco learned that the red and white colors on the Indonesian flag had existed long before this united state was established. In fact, the red and white had been used during the Majapahit kingdom, which ruled over Indonesia from 1292 to 1527 AD.

Prince Albert II has traveled to Indonesia on two private visits before 2010: from 11 to 13 November 1997, and from 2 to 10 December 2007, when he went to Nias Island to examine new housing for the area devastated by the 2004 tsunami. The "Siberut Conversation Project" for the local Siberut-Nias monkey was also visited by the Prince. The two NGOs "Act for Nature" and "Monaco Asie" coordinated the gathering.

The official establishment of diplomatic relations between the two nations started on 17 December 2010. On 22 March 2011, H.E. Rezlan Ishar Jenie, Ambassador Extraordinary and Plenipotentiary of the Republic of Indonesia to France, submitted his credentials to Prince Albert II at the Indonesian Embassy in Paris.

Mahmouod Al-Abood was appointed Indonesia's Honorary Consul for Monaco on 26 July 2017. The vice minister of Indonesia, Ambassador A.M. Fachir, met with Mr. Serge Telle, the head of administration for Monaco, on 2 December 2017, in Monaco.

A letter of intent between the Monaco Scientific Center and the Indonesian Ministry of Maritime Affairs and Fisheries was signed on 6 December 2018, during the International Coral Reef Initiative (ICRI) General Meeting by Mr. Patrick Rampal, Chairman of the Monaco Scientific Center, and Mr. Brahmantya Satyamurti Poerwadi, Director General of Marine Spatial Management (Indonesia). This agreement is being signed in response to the bilateral meeting that took place in Bali on October 29 between H.S.H. the Sovereign Prince and the President of the Republic of Indonesia.

On 17 May 2022, at the Prince's Palace of Monaco, H.E. Mr. Oemar gave Prince Albert II of Monaco a presentation of his credentials. Prince Albert II received a pledge from the Indonesian Ambassador to enhance future bilateral ties between Monaco and Indonesia. The creative economy, finance and banking, tourism, culture, and sports between Monaco and Indonesia are a few possible areas of focus.

== Trade ==
Trade between Indonesia and Monaco increased from $579,100 in 2015 to over $867 thousand in 2016. With a surplus of around $127,70, Indonesia's export balance was approximately $528,200. Pulp and paper, processed wood, textiles, leather, steel, machinery, and auto spare parts were among the goods exported by Indonesia to Monaco.

== Diplomatic missions ==
- Indonesia has no diplomatic presence in Monaco. Instead, its embassy in Paris is accredited to Monaco. However, Indonesia maintains an honorary consulate in Monaco, located in the Villa Ispahan.
- Monaco maintains an honorary consulate in Jakarta.

== See also ==
- Foreign relations of Indonesia
- Foreign relations of Monaco
- Flag of Bohemia
- Flag of Hesse
- Flag of Poland
