= Elsa Lindberg-Dovlette =

Swedish writer and princess

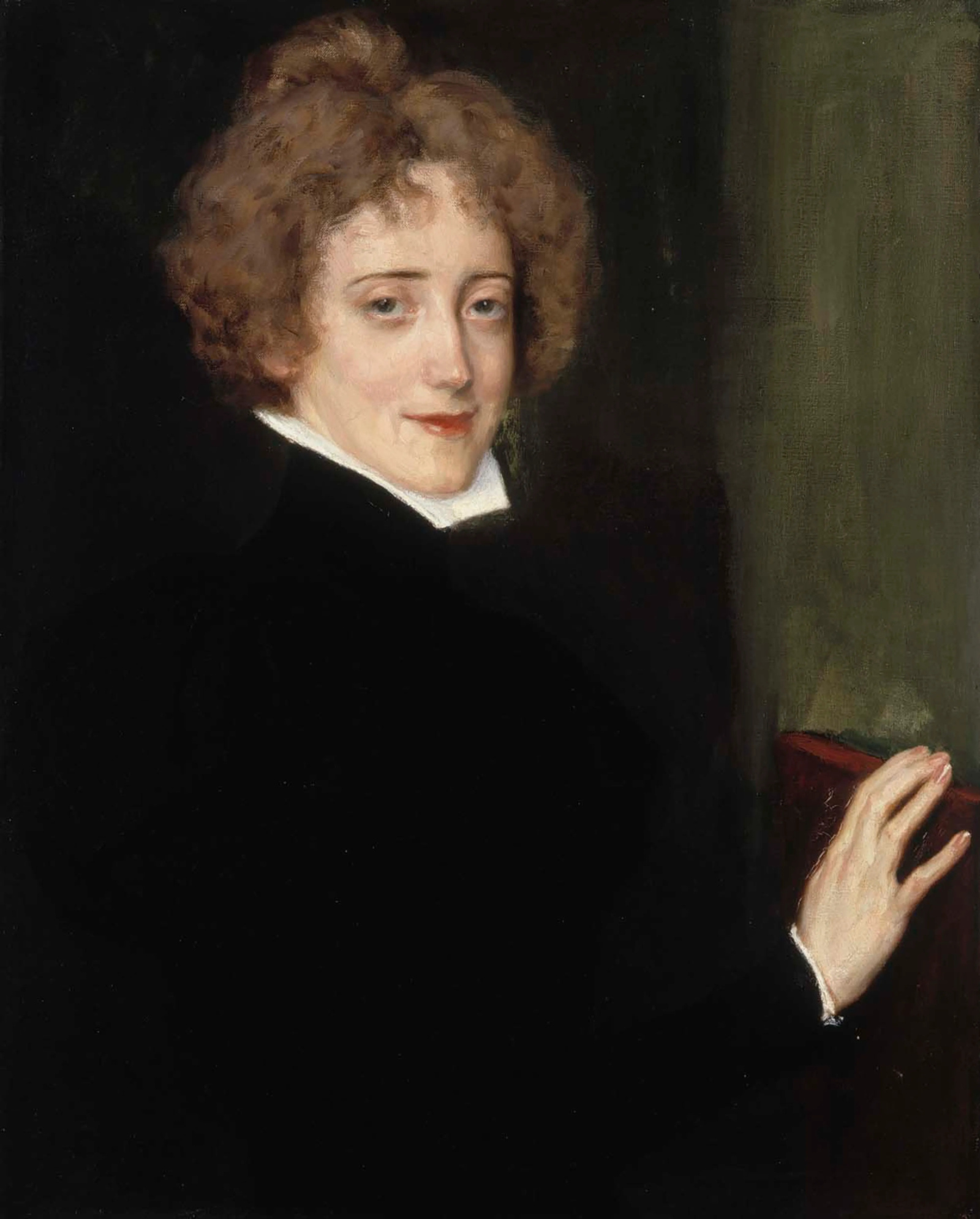
- Portrait of Elsa Lindberg-Dovlette in 1898
- Born: Elsa Cecilia Maria Lindberg; 13 February 1874; Stockholm, Sweden
- Died: 8 October 1944 (aged 70); Stockholm, Sweden
- Spouse: Mirza Riza Khan Arfa-ud-Dovleh
- Writing career
- Language: Swedish
- Genre: Fiction set in a harem

Elsa Cecilia Maria Lindberg-Dovlette (13 February 1874 – 8 October 1944) was a Swedish writer and Persian princess, known for her stories from a harem, an environment little understood in Europe at the time. Born in Stockholm to Finnish parents, she married a Persian prince in 1902 and moved into a harem, initially in Constantinople and later in Monaco. She wrote about harem life informed by her own experience, particularly that of being a European in an Asian culture. Her stories covered the complexity of harem life in the Ottoman Empire in the period before the First World War when traditional beliefs and practices were being challenged by new ideas. The books proved popular and were translated into Dutch, Finnish, French and German.

== Biography ==
Elsa Cecilia Maria Lindberg was born in Stockholm on 13 February 1874, the daughter of Johan Lindberg, a professor of music and Emmy Wiik, a native of Finland. She started writing for children. Her first book, Ann-Lis, was published in 1901. However, she is better known for her books for adults. In 1902, she married the Persian prince and diplomat Mirza Riza Khan Arfa-ud-Dovleh. She adopted the surname Lindberg-Dovlette, the latter part derived from her husband's name, although she was also titled Princess. She moved to Constantinople and lived in his harem. Her husband had separated from his previous wife, so she lived as sole wife. The conditions of the harem were consistent with historical practice in the Ottoman Empire, which was very different to her life before, including limitations on ability to travel outside the harem. In 1910, she moved to Monaco and there moved into Villa Ispahan, still living under the restrictions of the harem.

While living there, she wrote stories building on her experience of life in a harem. At the time, knowledge of what was inside a harem was limited in Europe and interest in the Ottoman and Persian Empires was ascendent. In almost all her stories, the protagonist is female.The main character in many of the stories, Astrid, was, like Lindberg-Dovlette, a Scandinavian, although the similarities did not stop there. Astrid too gained a hyphenated surname at marriage. Her work was in the style of an oriental fantasy, and covers the multiple challenges of balancing freedom and duty, the different world views of Muslim and Christian, the challenge of traditional customs from modern habits and the conflicts between old and young women. She also included information that is interesting to historians, like the multilingualism that characterised the Ottoman Empire in the days before the First World War. Even after the creation of Turkey, her writing still reflected the world that predated 1914.

Lindberg-Dovlette wrote both novels and short stories, many of the latter being compiled into collections during her lifetime. Her writing proved popular with European audiences and was translated into Dutch, Finnish, French and German. She died in Stockholm on 8 October 1944.

== Writing ==
Lindberg-Dovlette's output included in the following:

- Ann-Lis, 1901
- Kvinnor från minareternas stad (Women from the City of Minarets), 1908
- I alla tonarter (In all keys), 1921
- Främling (Stranger), 1924
- Bakom stängda haremsdörrar (Behind Closed Harem Doors), 1931
