= 2023–2025 global coral bleaching event =

Ongoing marine ecosystem phenomenon

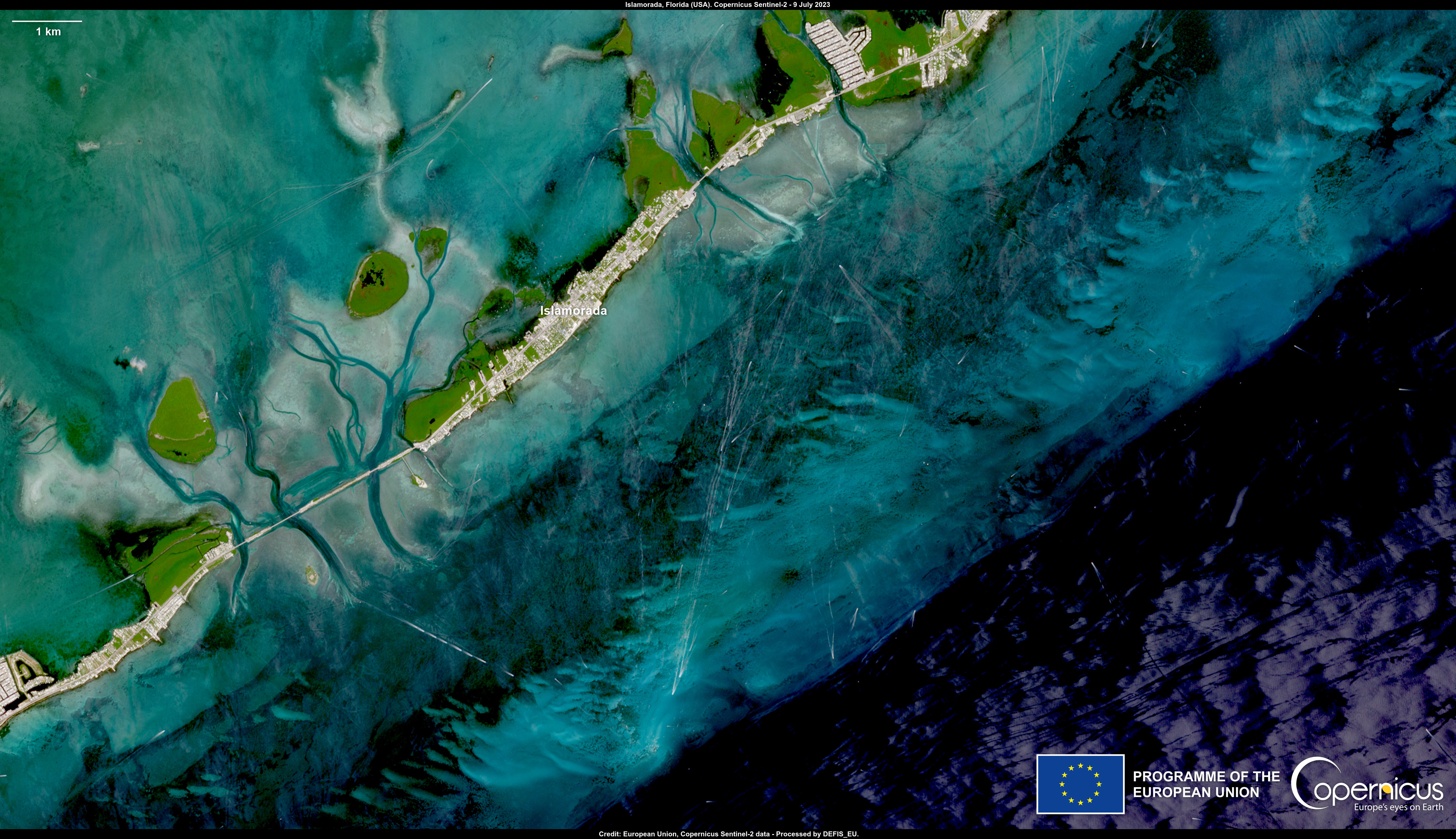
- Widespread coral bleaching in the Florida Keys archipelago during July 2023
- Date: February 2023 — 2025
- Location: Worldwide
- Also known as: Fourth Global Coral Bleaching Event
- Type: Mass coral bleaching event
- Cause: Elevated ocean temperatures exacerbated by anthropogenic climate change
- Outcome: About 84% of global coral reef ecosystems impacted

The 2023–2025 global coral bleaching event was an environmental disaster that represents the most extensive coral bleaching incident in recorded history, affecting approximately 84% of the Earth's coral reef ecosystems. Announced by the International Coral Reef Initiative (ICRI) in April 2025, the event was the fourth global bleaching event officially documented, and surpassed the previous 2014–17 event, which impacted roughly two-thirds of global reefs. Coral reefs in the territories of at least eighty-two nations suffered enough thermal stress to undergo bleaching.

The ongoing event, which began in February 2023, has been primarily attributed to escalating ocean temperatures associated with anthropogenic climate change, with marine researchers stating that there is no clear indication of when it might conclude.

== Background ==
Coral bleaching occurs when environmental stressors, particularly elevated ocean temperatures, disrupt the symbiotic relationship between coral polyps and zooxanthellae, the algae that reside within them. These algae provide corals with essential nutrients through photosynthesis and are responsible for their vibrant coloration. When subjected to prolonged thermal stress, these algae release toxic compounds, prompting the coral to expel them as a defensive measure. This expulsion reveals the coral's white limestone skeleton, leaving the organism weakened and significantly more vulnerable to mortality.

Prior to the 2020s, three recorded global bleaching were officially recorded in 1998, 2010, and 2014–2017. The share of affected coral reefs worldwide by the prior three bleaching events has been estimated to be 20%, 35%, and 56%.

== Event ==
In April 2024, the National Oceanic and Atmospheric Administration (NOAA) confirmed an ongoing fourth global coral bleaching event, the second such event in the past ten years. Coral mortalities reached up to 93% in areas like the Pacific coast near Mexico. Regions such as Florida experienced complete die-offs in some reefs, where water temperatures rose to 101 °F (38 °C). The Great Barrier Reef began to undergo its fifth extensive bleaching event since 2016.

NOAA video in 2024 documenting the coral bleaching event

In April 2024, a State of the Oceans report by Statista reported that 54% of coral reefs suffered from heat stress caused by the bleaching event. By October 2024, research conducted on coral reef environments indicated that approximately 77% of global reef systems were experiencing bleaching phenomena.

In April 2025, the International Coral Reef Initiative announced that 84% of ocean reefs were impacted by rising ocean temperatures, compared to approximately 67% during the 2014-2017 event. Scientists from the International Coral Reef Society expressed concern that ocean temperatures may not drop below bleaching thresholds in the foreseeable future, potentially maintaining a continuous state of bleaching stress on marine ecosystems.

The bleaching event coincides with record-breaking global temperatures, with 2024 documented as Earth's hottest year on record. Much of this thermal energy has been absorbed by the oceans, resulting in unprecedented sea surface temperatures. Meteorological data indicated that the average annual sea surface temperature in non-polar oceans reached 20.87 °C (69.57 °F) in 2024, exceeding the thermal tolerance of many coral species.

== Impact ==
Due to coral reef ecosystems providing the habitat for approximately 25% of marine species despite covering less than 1% of the ocean floor, their deterioration threatened the maintenance of marine biodiversity.

The NOAA reported that the anomalous ocean temperatures caused "multi-species or near complete mortality" in the most impacted coral reef ecosystems. Healthy Reefs for Healthy People marine researcher Melanie McField stated that the prolonged and more intense marine heatwaves responsible for the bleaching event caused more robust species of coral to be impacted, and stated that the repeated heatwaves would prevent coral recovery. McField reported that a significant coral reef off the coast of Honduras that had maintained about 46% coverage of living coral in September 2023 had fallen to 5% living coral by February 2024, which she described as unprecedented in her program's records.

Over 50 to 93% of coral reefs around Huatulco were killed by November 2023, with significant losses of fish biomass and echinoderm species abundance being recorded. Several reefs reported in "thermal refugia" like the Gulf of Aqaba and Raja Ampat due to their exposure to cooler waters buffering against hotter global ocean temperatures were damaged. In the Chagos Archipelago, 85% of coral reefs were impacted and 23% were killed by December 2024, with up to 95% killed in areas such as the Peros Banhos Atoll. The Australian Institute of Marine Science (AIMS) reported that over a third of the live hard coral around Lizard Island and Cooktown in the northern Great Barrier Reef had been killed off, determined to be the largest annual drop in nearly forty years of records. The AIMS coral monitoring program leader Dr. Mike Emslie characterized the event as having created a "graveyard of corals".

Several marine-dependent services, including the farming of seafood, tourism-centered economies, were reported to be impacted as a result. Marine researchers also predicted that the bleaching and subsequent death of coral reef ecosystems would lead to greater coastal erosion and vulnerability to storms.

== Responses ==
The severity of the 2023-2025 bleaching event prompted NOAA's Coral Reef Watch program to expand its bleaching alert scale with three additional categories to accurately represent the unprecedented risk of coral mortality. This adjustment became necessary as traditional measurement methods proved inadequate for capturing the extreme conditions observed during this event. University of New South Wales climatologist Alex Sen Gupta described the addition of categories as the "coral reef equivalent of adding Category 6 and 7 to the tropical cyclone scale".

In October 2024, the United Nations convened an extraordinary emergency session alongside the COP16 biodiversity summit in Cali, Colombia to determine potential future responses to the bleaching event.

== See also ==
- Atlantic meridional overturning circulation
- Effects of climate change on oceans
- Ocean stratification
- Ocean deoxygenation
