= TagLab =

Software for coral reef monitoring

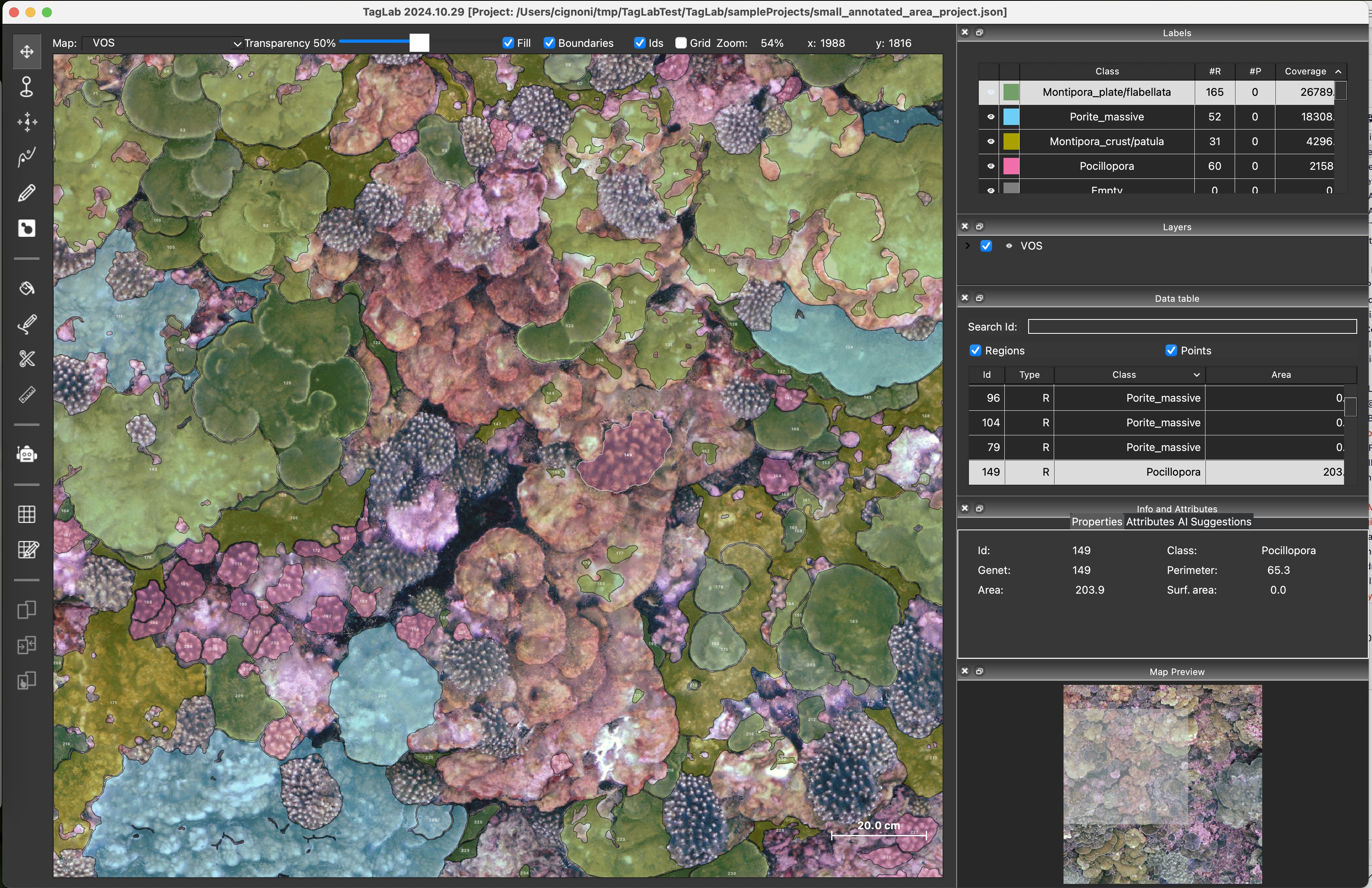
- TagLab
- Developer(s): ISTI - CNR
- Stable release: 2024.10.29 / October 29, 2024; 4 months ago
- Written in: python
- Operating system: Cross-platform
- Type: Graphics software
- License: GPL
- Website: taglab.isti.cnr.it

TagLab is an interactive open source software system for facilitating the precise annotation of benthic species in orthophoto of the bottom of the sea. TagLab can automatically extract statistical informations about the evolution of monitored species and it segments large images using CNN-based algorithms.

TagLab used also for the monitoring of the health of coral reefs, in order to quantify over large orthophotos of the seabed the extent of coral bleaching events. Notable users of TagLab are MOTE Marine Laboratory, the Hawaiʻi Institute of Marine Biology, National Oceanic and Atmospheric Administration, and Scripps Institution of Oceanography.

TagLab is listed as one of the main tools for the standard operating procedures for the use of large-area imaging in tropical shallow water coral reef monitoring, research, and restoration.

TagLab has won the 2023 VRVis Visual Computing Award for being "an open-source software solution that mitigates technological disparities between labs and promotes shared data standards and protocols".
