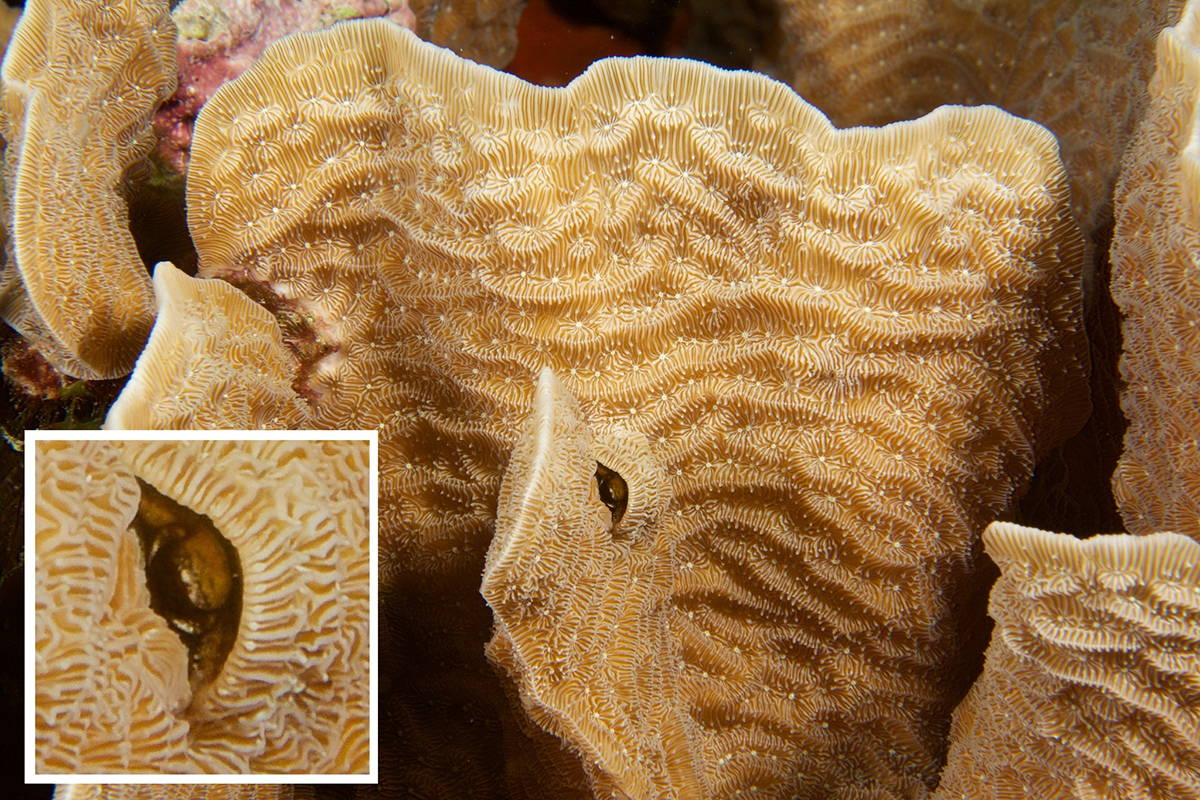
- with a gall crab blown up

Conservation status
- Critically Endangered (IUCN 3.1)

- Vulnerable (NatureServe)

Scientific classification
- Kingdom: Animalia
- Phylum: Cnidaria
- Subphylum: Anthozoa
- Class: Hexacorallia
- Order: Scleractinia
- Family: Agariciidae
- Genus: Agaricia
- Species: A. tenuifolia

Binomial name
- Agaricia tenuifolia Dana, 1848

= Agaricia tenuifolia =

Species of coral

Agaricia tenuifolia, commonly known as thin leaf lettuce coral, is a species of colonial stony coral in the family Agariciidae. This coral is found in shallow waters in the Caribbean Sea and Gulf of Mexico.

== Description ==
In sheltered waters, A. tenuifolia forms irregular encrusting patches with many vertical, leaf-like blades. The corallites, which are on both sides of these blades, are arranged in meandering rows separated by irregular ridges. In places with more vigorous wave action, this coral may form spherical colonies. The colour of this coral is usually pale brown, reddish-brown or greenish-brown.

== Distribution ==
A. tenuifolia is native to the Caribbean Sea and the Gulf of Mexico. It is common in the southern part of this range but less so in the north. It occurs on shallow-water reefs and lagoons at depths between 1 and 15 metres (3 and 49 ft).

== Ecology ==
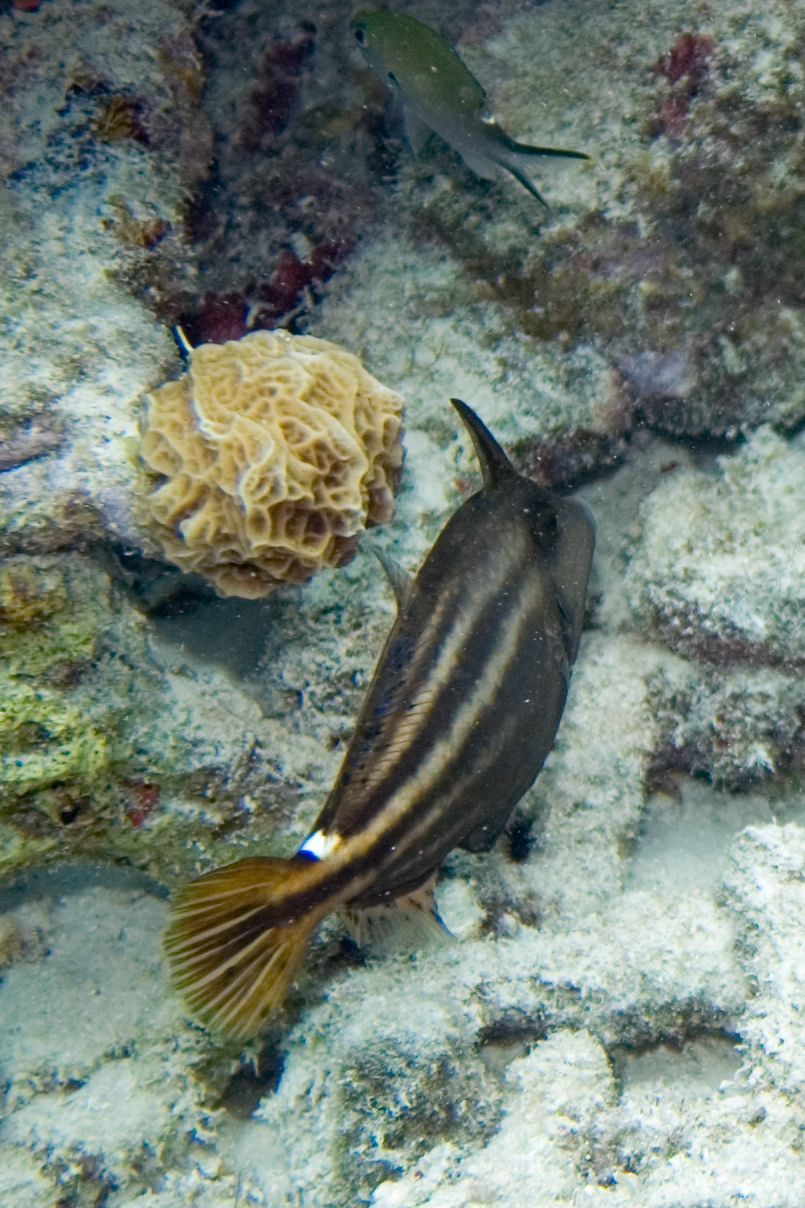
Spherical form with the orangespotted filefish (Cantherhines pullus)

A. tenuifolia is a zooxanthellate species of coral, having symbiotic unicellular dinoflagellates housed in its tissues. These are photosynthetic and use the sun's energy to create nutrients which the coral is able to use and on which it relies for much of its nutritional needs. The coral also feeds at night when the polyps expand and extend their tentacles to catch the zooplankton floating past.

A. tenuifolia is susceptible to bleaching, a process where the coral expels the zooxanthellae from its tissues and turns white. This happens under adverse circumstances, such as when the water temperature becomes too high. This coral recruits readily to open patches of reef in the Meso-American barrier reef off Belize, but could be considered a "coral weed" as it prevents other, more long-lived corals from recruiting. In this location, corals were affected by a severe bleaching event in 1999 and although other species later recovered, A. tenuifolia suffered 100% mortality.

== Status ==
A. tenuifolia is susceptible to bleaching and coral diseases, which put it at risk, but it is a fast-growing species and readily colonises disturbed areas of the reef and therefore has the potential to recover rapidly. For these reasons, the International Union for Conservation of Nature has assessed its conservation status as being critically endangered.
