= Reza Khan Arfa Danesh =

Iranian diplomat and poet (1846–1937)

- رضاخان ارفع دانش
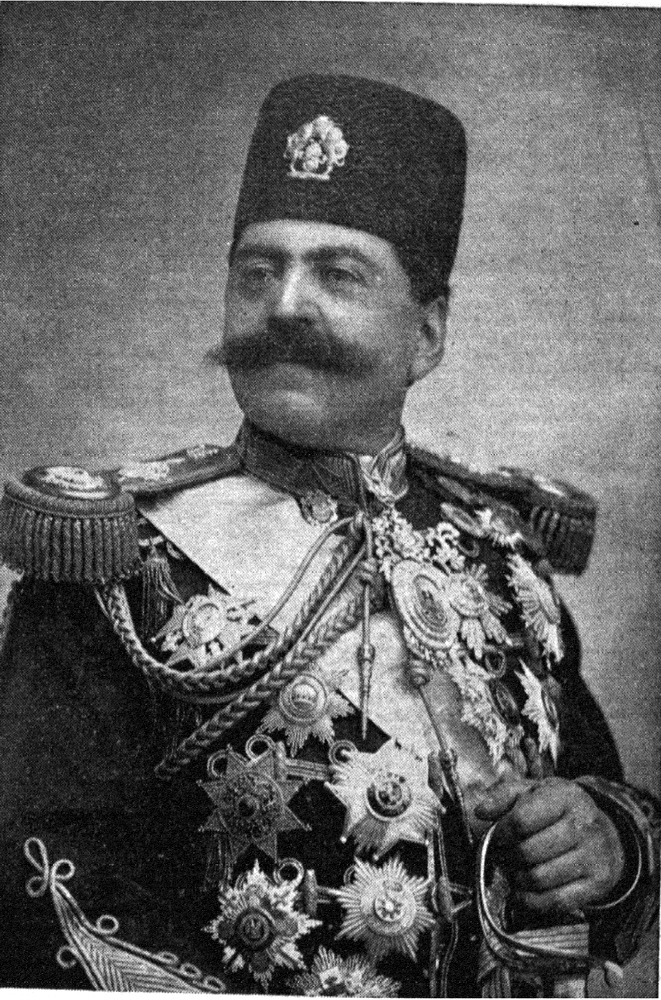
- Photograph of Reza Khan Arfa Danesh, dated 1907

Personal details
- Born: c. 1846 Tabriz, Qajar Iran
- Died: 1937 Tehran, Pahlavi Iran
- Children: Hasan Arfa
- Writing career
- Language: Persian; French
- Notable works: Resala-ye roshdiya Perles d'Orient

Reza Khan Arfa Danesh (Persian: رضاخان ارفع دانش; c. 1846–1937) was an Iranian diplomat and poet during the late Qajar era. He was the father of Hasan Arfa, a high-ranking military officer during the Pahlavi era.

== Career ==
He was the eldest son of Haji Shaikh Hasan Sarraf Iravani, a merchant who had relocated from Erivan (Yerevan) to Tabriz after Qajar Iran lost control of the former during the Russo-Iranian War of 1826–1828. During the war, Reza Arfa's grandfather Mirza Ebrahim had served as the chief minister of the Erivan Khanate. In Tabriz, Reza Arfa's father established a small business and married. Reza Arfa was born there, in c. 1846. He received a traditional education, being taught religious studies and the poetry of the Persian poets Hafez, Saadi Shirazi, and Ferdowsi. His father intended for him to become a mullah (Muslim clergy), and thus had him sent to a religious school. However, a flood in 1872 damaged his father's business, which made Reza Arfa go to the Ottoman capital of Constantinople to work for his brother-in-law Haji Aqa Reza Salmasi.

Besides working, he also studied English, Ottoman Turkish, and French. In 1875, after a visit to Tabriz, he stopped in Tbilisi in the Russian Empire, where he started working in the Iranian embassy. In 1902, Reza Arfa was appointed as the Iranian ambassador in Constantinople. He started to lose importance in the capital Tehran when Mohammad Ali Shah Qajar became shah in 1907. Reza Arfa was dismissed in 1910 and thus moved to France, claiming he had "never liked living in Iran".

Reza Arfa met several prominent European politicians throughout his years of service outside Iran. He reportedly had pro-Russian leanings, and in 1900, played a key role in making Iran receive their first loan from the Russian Empire. At the same time, he reportedly backed the Anglo-Persian Agreement in 1919. In 1914, he was appointed as the Minister of Justice in Tehran, which he held for approximately a year.

Throughout his postings outside Iran, the enormous wealth he amassed sometimes stemmed from corrupt methods. He obtained high-paying government positions through bribery. In 1899, Mozaffar ad-Din Shah Qajar (r. 1896–1907) bestowed the title of "Mirza" to Reza Arfa in appreciation of the reception he hosted for him at his residence in Saint Petersburg. A person of aristocratic or prestigious origin was represented by the title of Mirza. Reza Arfa died in 1937 in Tehran. His son Hasan Arfa was a high-ranking military officer during the Pahlavi era.

== Poetry and building projects ==
Using "Danesh" as his pen-name, Reza Arfa also wrote poetry in Persian and French, which the modern Iranian writer Ali-Akbar Sa'idi Sirjani described as "mediocre". His Resala-ye roshdiya, a study on the Persian script was published in Constantinople in 1879. His French work Perles d'Orient was published in 1904. He is also the author of an autobiography.

By assisting in the establishment of a school named Dabestan-e Danesh, he played an important role in early efforts to create a modern educational system in Iran. He also had a home, Villa Ispahan, built in Monaco due to his fondness for a luxurious and high-profile lifestyle.

He was amongst the early advocates to restore elements of Iran's pre-Islamic heritage into the modern public style, such as when he used the Taq Kasra as an inspiration when rebuilding the façade of the Ministry in 1913/14.

== See also ==
- Villa Firuze

== Sources ==
- Marzolph, Ulrich; Zenhari, Roxana (2022). Mirzā ʿAli-Qoli Khoʾi: The Master Illustrator of Persian Lithographed Books in the Qajar Period. Vol. 1. Brill Publishers. ISBN 978-1845118280.
- Noël-Clarke, Michael (2016). Memories of a Bygone Age: Qajar Persia and Imperial Russia 1853-1902. Gingko Library. ISBN 978-1909942868.
- Sirjani, Ali-Akbar Sa'idi (1993). "Dāneš, Reżā Khan Arfaʿ". In Yarshater, Ehsan (ed.). Encyclopædia Iranica (Online ed.). Encyclopædia Iranica Foundation. ISBN 978-0933273634.
