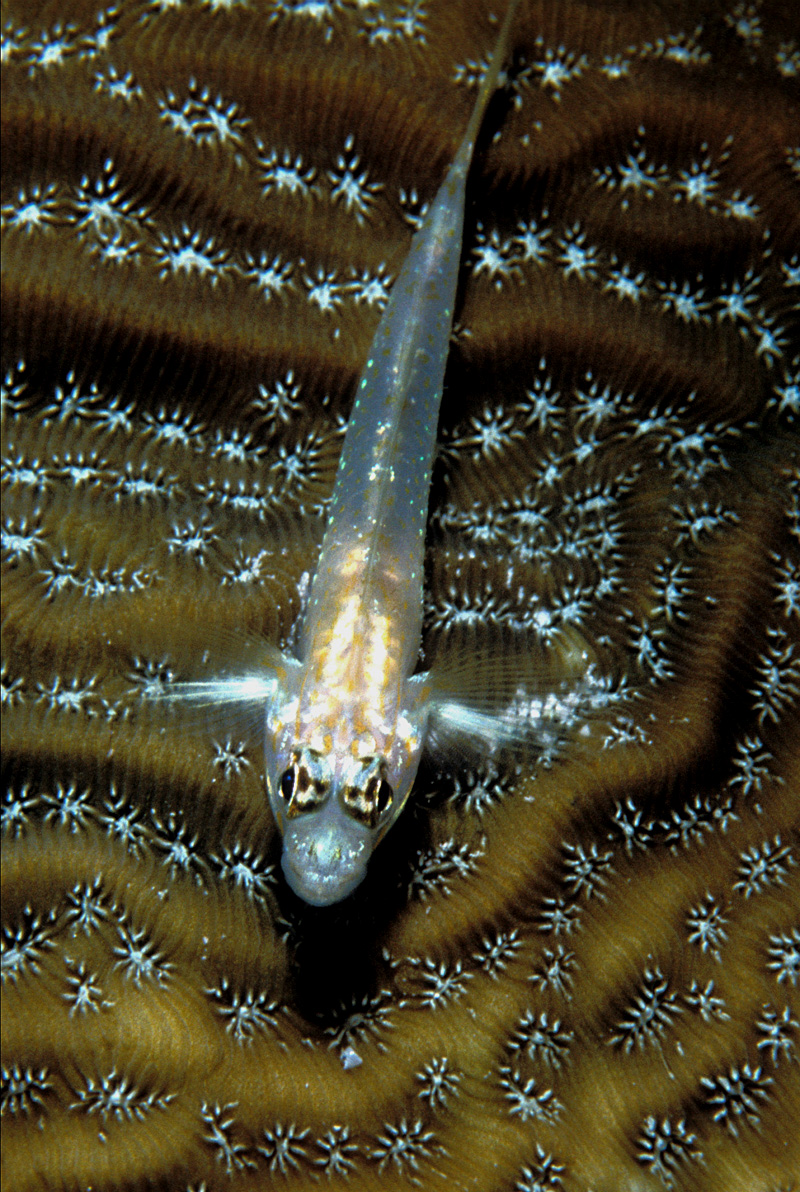
- Bridled goby (Coryphopterus glaucofraenum) resting on Graham's sheet coral (Agaricia grahamae)

Scientific classification
- Kingdom: Animalia
- Phylum: Cnidaria
- Subphylum: Anthozoa
- Class: Hexacorallia
- Order: Scleractinia
- Family: Agariciidae
- Genus: Agaricia; Lamarck, 1801

Species
- See text

Synonyms
- Undaria Oken, 1815

= Agaricia =

Genus of corals

Agaricia is a genus of colonial stony corals in the family Agariciidae. These corals are found in shallow waters of the West Indies.

== Characteristics ==
Corals in this genus have several different forms but are usually massive, leaf-like or plate-like. Members of the genus are distinguished from other corals by having no walls to the corallites but having clearly delineated septocostae that connect each corallite to its neighbours.

== Species ==
The World Register of Marine Species recognises the following species:

- Agaricia agaricites (Linnaeus, 1758)
- Agaricia fragilis Dana, 1846
- Agaricia grahamae Wells, 1973
- Agaricia humilis Verrill, 1901
- Agaricia lamarcki Milne Edwards & Haime, 1851
- Agaricia tenuifolia Dana, 1846
- Agaricia undata (Ellis & Solander, 1786)
