= Villa Firuze =

Palace Firuze
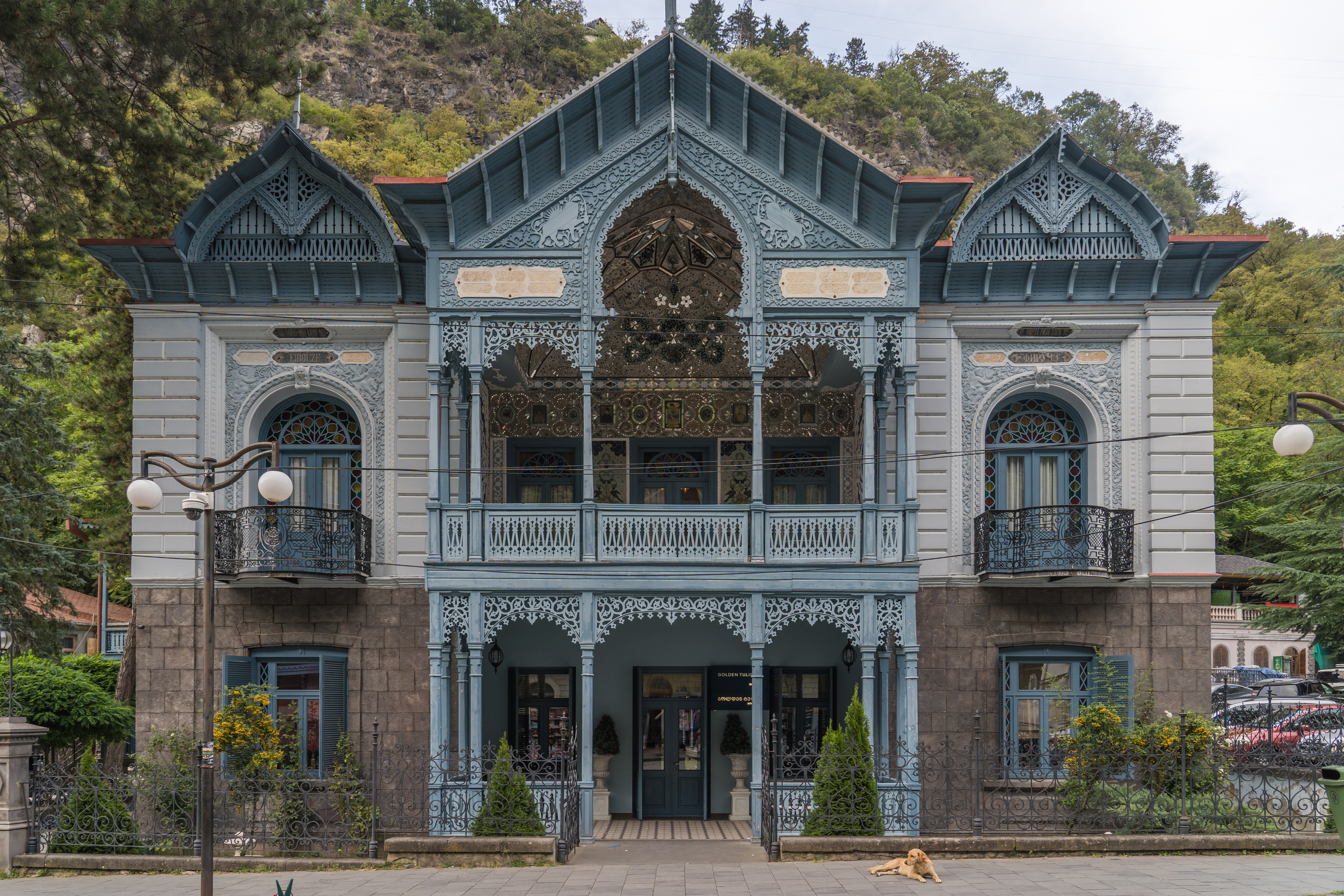
- Interactive map of the Palace Firuze area

General information
- Architectural style: Persian architecture
- Coordinates: 41.8364°N 43.3902°E
- Year built: 1892
- Owner: Reza Khan Arfa Danesh

Palace Firuze or Villa Firuze is a historic villa located in Borjomi, Georgia, known for its unique architectural style and rich cultural history. The site has been recognized for its mineral and curative waters since ancient times and was originally part of the territory owned by the Georgian noble family of Avalishvili.

== History ==
Villa Firuze is situated in Borjomi, a location renowned for its mineral and therapeutic waters throughout history. Originally, the land was owned by the Avaliashvili noble family, but in the 19th century, the area's natural resources caught the attention of Russian imperial authorities, transforming it into a favored summer retreat for the imperial family.

The extension of the Transcaucasus Railway to Borjomi in 1894 made the region more accessible, further enhancing its popularity. The Russian royal family frequently visited, and when Grand Duke Nicholas Mikhailovich, the brother of Alexander II, became the Viceroy of the Caucasus, he constructed a palace in Borjomi. This development prompted Georgian elites and foreign dignitaries to establish summer residences in the vicinity.

In 1891, Mirza Reza Khan, Iran's Consul in Tiflis, acting on the advice of prominent Iranian grand merchants who believed in the promising future of the area, invested a significant portion of the Consulate's funds in real estate in Borjomi. He acquired a valuable plot of land at the entrance to Borjomi Park and, in 1892, constructed a residence named Firuze, meaning "turquoise" in Persian. Designed in traditional Iranian architectural style, the villa served as a private retreat for his family and close guests, and was also referred to as the Firouze Hotel.

After Reza Khan's departure from Georgia, the villa continued to operate as a guesthouse or resort. By the 1910s, it functioned as a hotel.

During the Democratic Republic of Georgia (1918–1921) and after the Russian occupation (1921), the building seemingly continued to function as a guesthouse. However, following the occupation, Firuze was transferred to state ownership. There are no clear photographs from the 1920s that display the inscription "Hotel Firuze". Between the 1930s and the 1950s, the building was used as a residence for professional unions and as a guesthouse, and starting in 1950, it became part of the "Firuze" sanatorium. By the late 1980s, the building was designated as an immovable cultural heritage monument of Georgia.

In the 1990s, the building ceased to operate as a sanatorium and was repurposed by the government to provide housing for forcibly displaced individuals. During this time, it fell into disrepair and suffered damage. In 2011, it was restored and revitalized. Today, Villa Firuze is a hotel called Golden Tulip hotel.

== Architecture ==
Villa Firuze is situated on 9 April Street (formerly known as Anastasiyevskaya Street), right next to Borjomi Park. The villa features a design made up of multiple courtyards, terraces, and smaller structures arranged into a unified whole. The front of the building faces the river, while the back opens onto a private inner courtyard.

The building was made from different materials, with the main walls constructed of stone and many other parts, like the kitchen, balconies, and windows, made of wood. The windows on the front of the building have pointed arches and are decorated with wooden carvings. The doors and window frames are detailed with ferrous sheet panels, and the decor includes paintings, photographs, ceramic tiles, plasterwork, and stucco ceilings with typical ornaments from that period. Until the 21st century, the building kept many of its original features, although some interior elements were damaged or lost.

Only a few rooms retained the wooden paneling and ceiling moldings on the first floor. In one room on the second floor, the walls were adorned with geometric patterns, gilding, and landscape scenes. The dining room showcased a ceiling with a decorative wooden rosette inspired by the stalactite motif (muqarnas). Additionally, there was inlay work featuring geometric designs in white, red, and light brown wood arranged in ornamental patterns. Iranian specialists were involved in the restoration process that took place between 2010 and 2012.

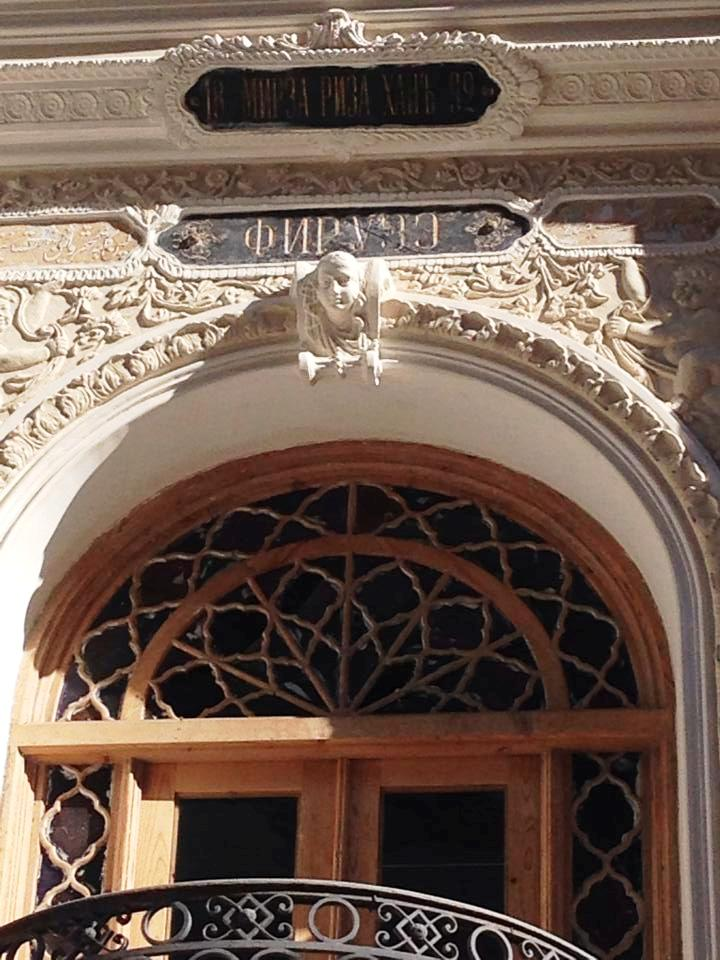
Cyrillic inscription above the right balcony

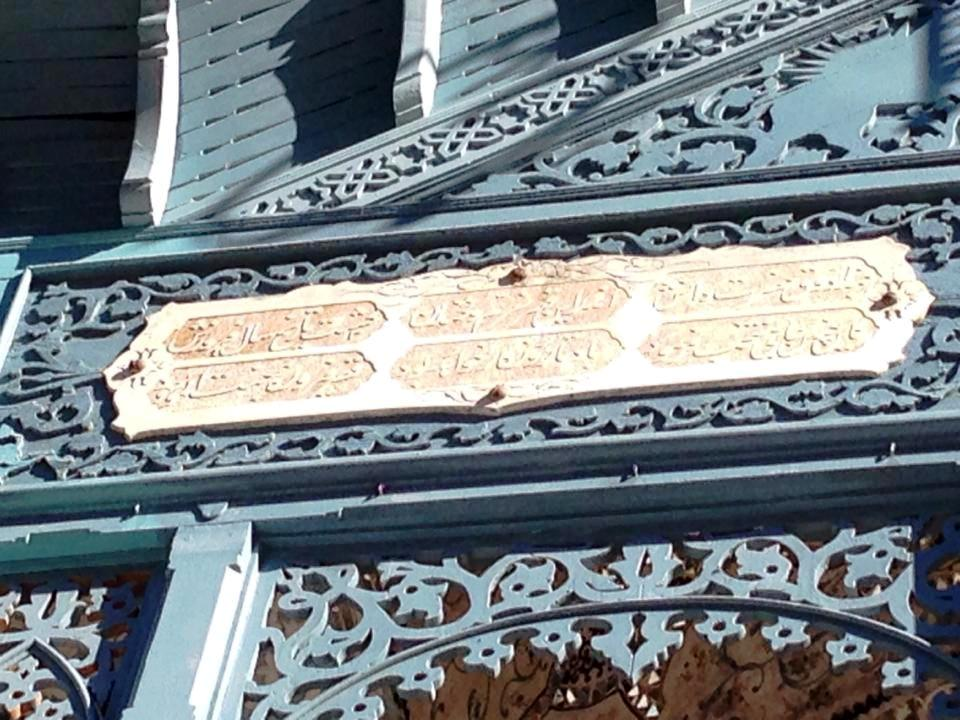
Inscription in Persian on the left side of the central balcony

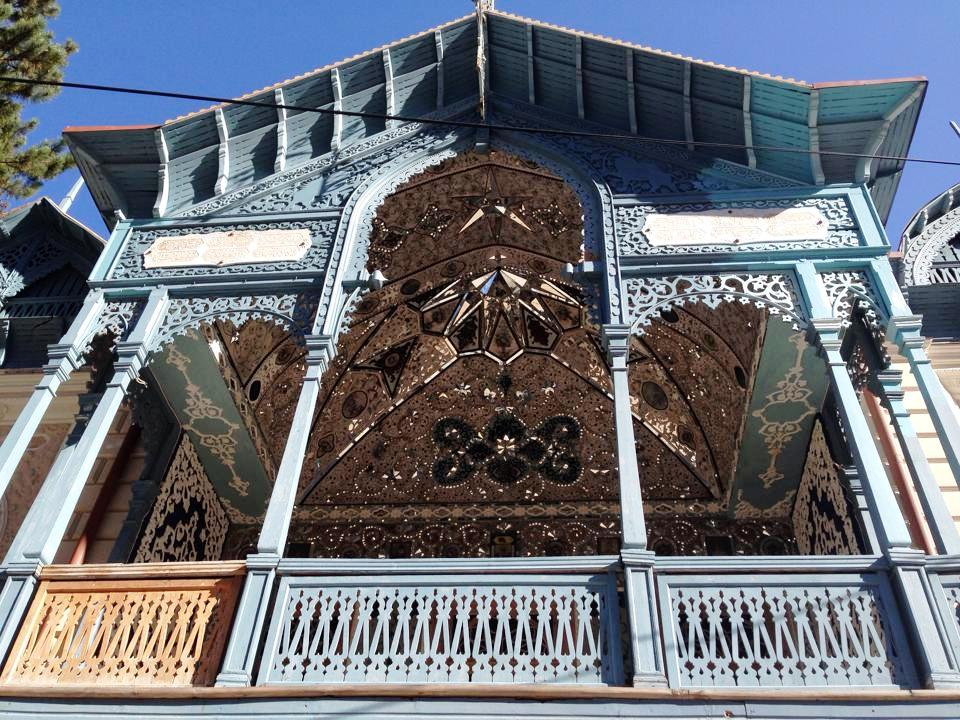
Mirror and turquoise patterns on the inside of the central balcony

== Bibliography ==
- Gengiuri, Nato (2016). XIX საუკუნის არქიტექტურა საქართველოში და კულტურული იდენტობა: ვილა "ფირუზე" ბორჯომში [Architecture of the 19th Century in Georgia and Cultural Identity: Villa Firuze in Borjomi]. National Agency for Cultural Heritage Preservation of Georgia.
- Alexidze, Marina; Beradze, Grigol; Koshoridze, Irina (2018). "Diplomacy, Architecture and Poetry: Mirza Reza Khan Arfa' ad-Dowle and Georgia". In Sanikidze, George (ed.). აღმოსავლეთსა და დასავლეთს შორის: ირანელი და ფრანგი ავტორები მე-19 საუკუნის საქართველოს შესახებ [Between East and West: Iranian and French Authors about 19th Century Georgia] (PDF). Tbilisi: Ilia State University Press. ISBN 978-9941-18-299-0.
