= Coral bleaching =

Phenomenon where corals expel algae tissue

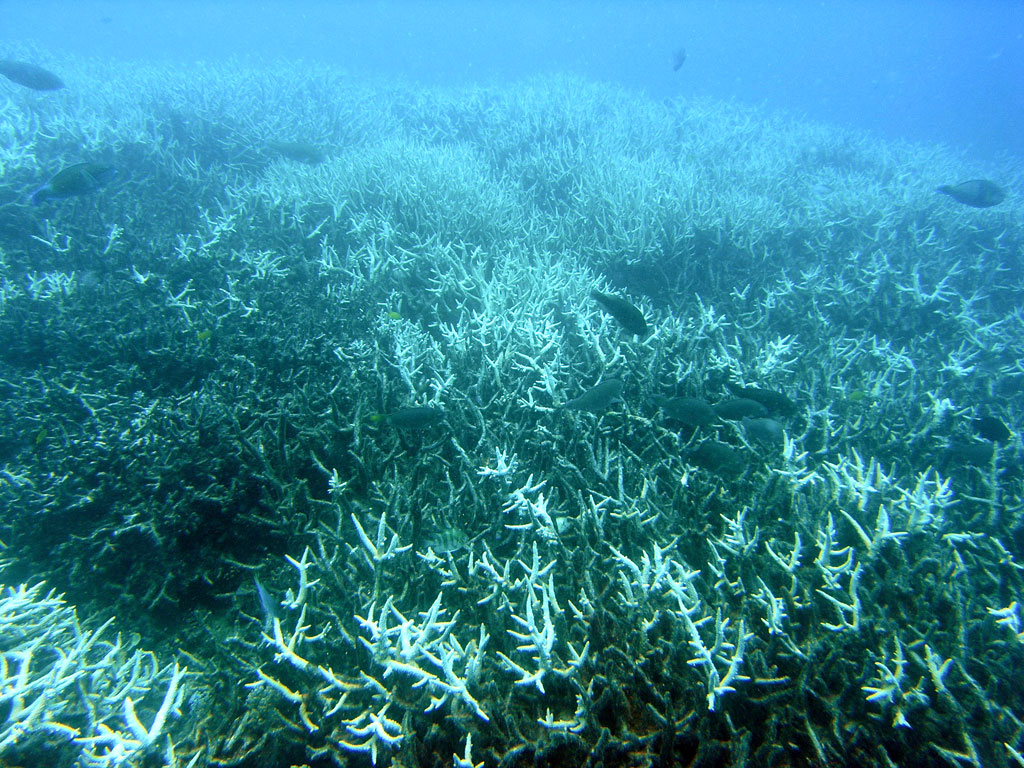
Bleached coral

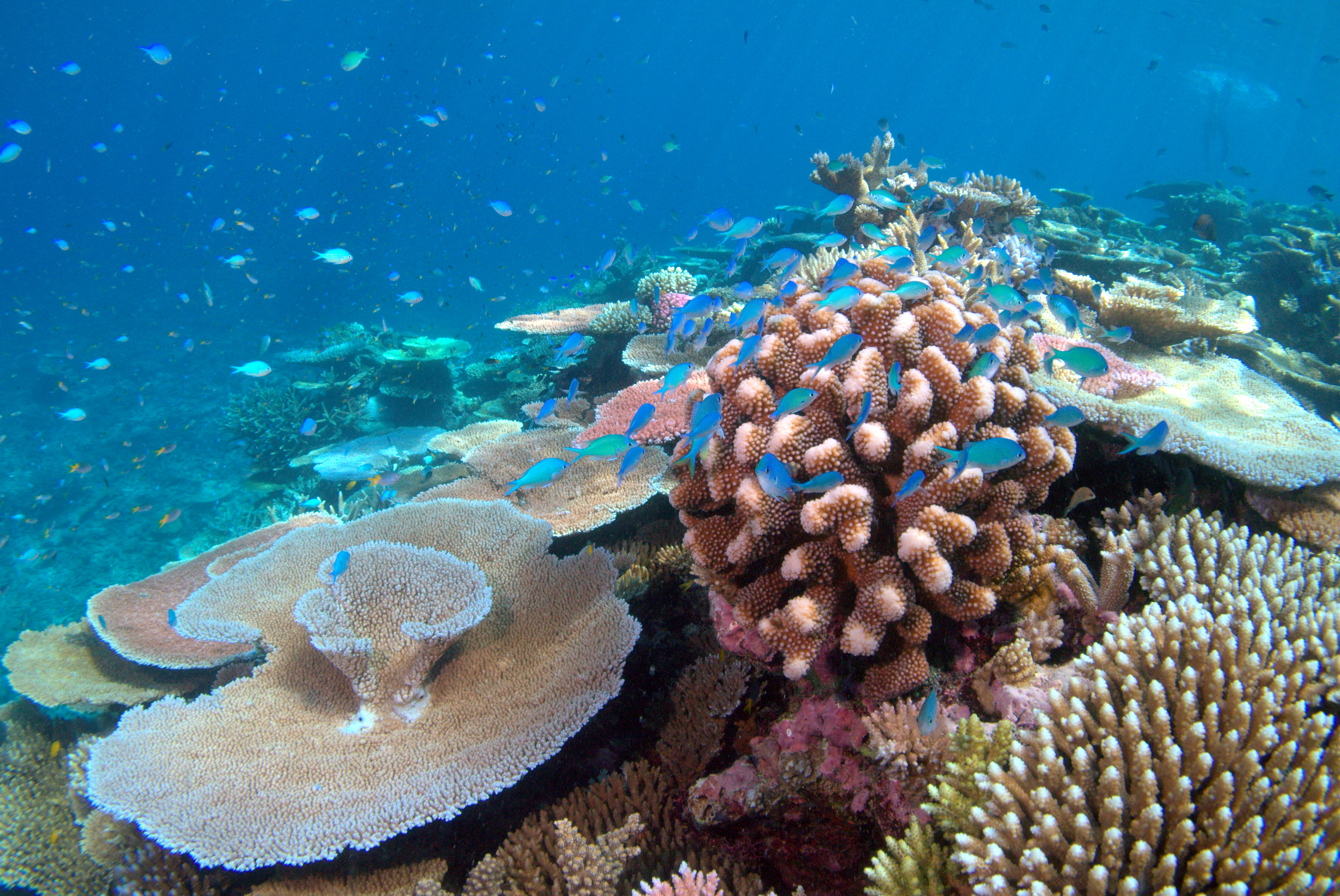
Healthy coral

Coral bleaching is the process where corals become white due to loss of symbiotic algae and photosynthetic pigments. This loss of pigment can be caused by various stressors, such as changes in water temperature, light, salinity, or nutrients. A bleached coral is under stress, more vulnerable to starvation and disease, and at risk of death. The leading cause of coral bleaching is rising ocean temperatures due to climate change. Take up of carbon dioxide from the atmosphere also has been acidifying the oceans and affects coral health. Large-scale bleaching events can devastate entire reef ecosystems, affecting biodiversity and the livelihoods of coastal communities that depend on healthy reefs for food, tourism, and protection from storm surges.

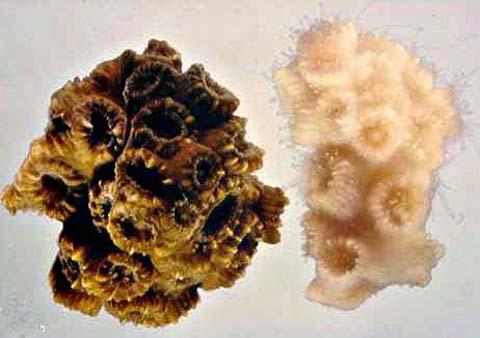
Healthy coral at left, and bleached, but still living, coral at right

According to the United Nations Environment Programme, between 2014 and 2016, the global bleaching events killed coral on an unprecedented scale for the time. In 2016, bleaching of coral on the Great Barrier Reef killed 29 to 50 percent of the reef's coral. Bleaching events impact many regions of the world, including Australia, Hawaii, Japan, and more. Natural corals adapted against bleaching and human assistance with reef building may help prevent further damage.

On April 15th, 2024, NOAA (National Oceanic and Atmospheric Administration) confirmed the world was in the midst of its fourth and largest global coral bleaching event. From 1 January 2023 to 30 September 2025, bleaching-level heat stress impacted ~84.4% of the worlds coral reef area and bleaching has been documented in at least 83 countries and territories.

== Process ==
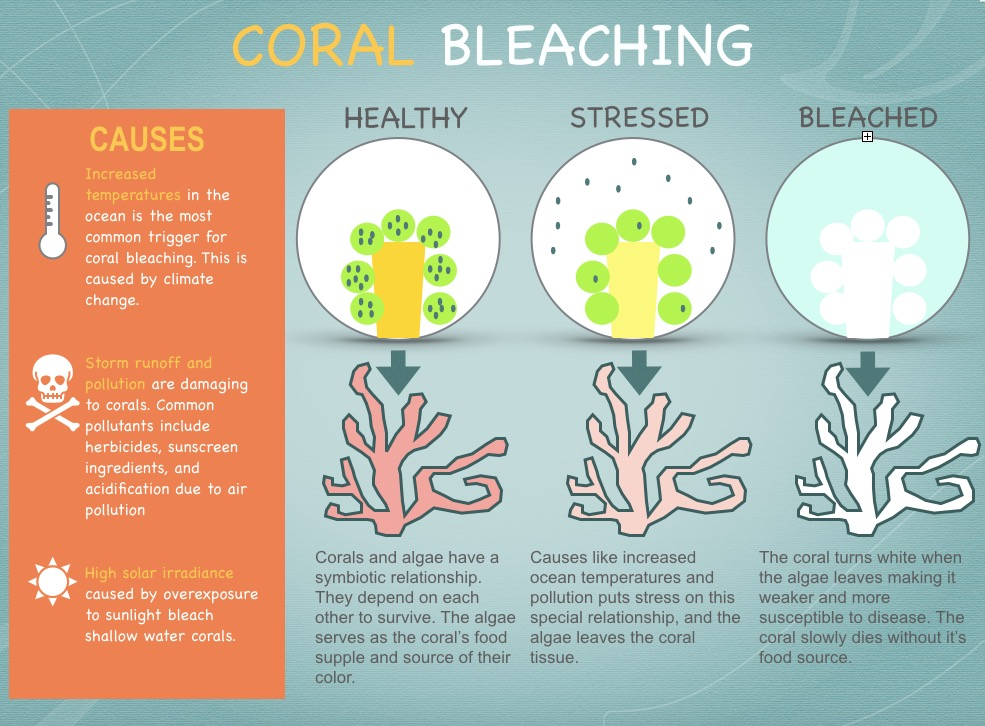
Coral and microscopic algae have a symbiotic relationship. When water temperatures get too high, the algae leave the coral tissue and the coral begins to starve.

The corals that form the great reef ecosystems of tropical seas depend upon a symbiotic relationship with algae-like single-celled flagellate protozoa called zooxanthellae that live within their tissues and give the coral its coloration. The zooxanthellae provide the coral with nutrients through photosynthesis, a crucial factor in the clear and nutrient-poor tropical waters. In exchange, the coral provides the zooxanthellae with the carbon dioxide and ammonium needed for photosynthesis. Negative environmental conditions, such as abnormally warm or cool temperatures, high light, and even some microbial diseases, can lead to the breakdown of the coral/zooxanthellae symbiosis. According to a study done by D.J. Smith et al., photoinhibition is a likely factor in coral bleaching. It also suggests that the hydrogen peroxide produced in zooxanthealle plays a role in signaling themselves to flee the corals. To ensure short-term survival, the coral-polyp then consumes or expels the zooxanthellae. This leads to a lighter or completely white appearance, hence the term "bleached". Under mild stress conditions, some corals may appear bright blue, pink, purple, or yellow instead of white, due to the continued or increased presence of the coral cells' intrinsic pigment molecules, a phenomenon known as "colourful bleaching". As the zooxanthellae provide up to 90 percent of the coral's energy needs through products of photosynthesis, after expelling, the coral may begin to starve.

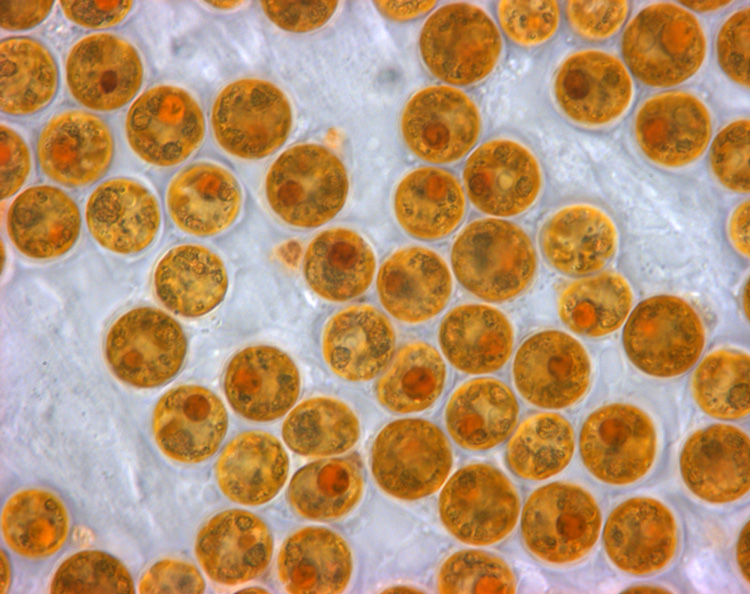
Zooxanthellae, the microscopic algae that lives inside coral, gives it colour and provides it with food through photosynthesis

Coral can survive short-term disturbances, but if the conditions that lead to the expulsion of the zooxanthellae persist, the coral's chances of survival diminish. In order to recover from bleaching, the zooxanthellae have to re-enter the tissues of the coral polyps and restart photosynthesis to sustain the coral as a whole and the ecosystem that depends on it. If the coral polyps die of starvation after bleaching, they will decay. The hard coral species will then leave behind their calcium carbonate skeletons, which will be taken over by algae, effectively blocking coral regrowth. Eventually, the coral skeletons will erode, causing the reef structure to collapse.

== Common triggers ==
Coral bleaching may be caused by a number of factors. While localized triggers lead to localized bleaching, the large-scale coral bleaching events of recent years have been triggered by global warming. Under the increased carbon dioxide concentration expected in the 21st century, corals are expected to become increasingly rare on reef systems. Coral reefs located in warm, shallow water with low water flow have been more affected than reefs located in areas with higher water flow. Marine heatwaves caused by the El Nino Southern Oscillation have been found to be one of the main causes of widespread coral bleaching and consequent coral mortality.

=== List of triggers ===
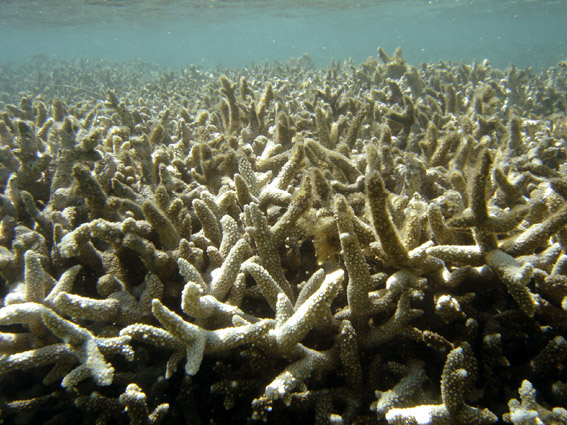
Bleached coral—partially overgrown with algae

- increased water temperature (marine heatwaves, most commonly due to global warming), or reduced water temperatures
- increased solar irradiance (photosynthetically active radiation and ultraviolet light)
- increased sedimentation (due to silt runoff)
- bacterial infections
- changes in salinity
- herbicides
- extreme low tide and exposure
- cyanide fishing
- elevated sea levels due to global warming (Watson)
- mineral dust from African dust storms caused by drought
- pollutants such as oxybenzone, butylparaben, octyl methoxycinnamate, or enzacamene: four common sunscreen ingredients that are nonbiodegradable and can wash off of skin
- ocean acidification due to elevated levels of CO_{2} caused by air pollution
- being exposed to oil or other chemical spills
- changes in water chemistry, particularly an imbalance in the ratio of the macronutrients nitrate and phosphate
- meteorological conditions

== Trends due to climate change ==
Extreme bleaching events are directly linked with climate-induced phenomena that increase ocean temperature, such as El Niño-Southern Oscillation (ENSO). The warming ocean surface waters can lead to bleaching of corals which can cause serious damage and coral death. The IPCC Sixth Assessment Report in 2022 found that: "Since the early 1980s, the frequency and severity of mass coral bleaching events have increased sharply worldwide". Coral reefs, as well as other shelf-sea ecosystems, such as rocky shores, kelp forests, seagrasses, and mangroves, have recently undergone mass mortalities from marine heatwaves. It is expected that many coral reefs will "undergo irreversible phase shifts due to marine heatwaves with global warming levels >1.5°C".

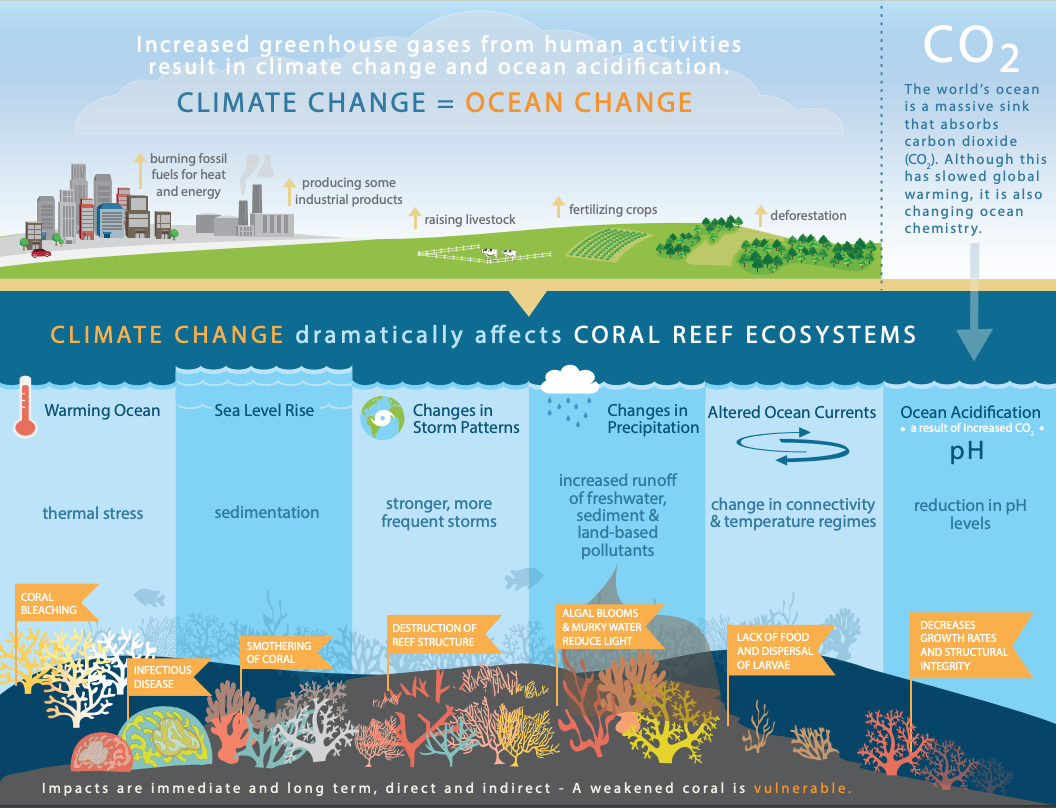
Climate change will affect coral reef ecosystems, through sea level rise, changes to the frequency and intensity of tropical storms, and altered ocean circulation patterns. When combined, all of these impacts dramatically alter ecosystem function, as well as the goods and services coral reef ecosystems provide.

This problem was already identified in 2007 by the Intergovernmental Panel on Climate Change (IPCC) as the greatest threat to the world's reef systems.

The Great Barrier Reef experienced its first major bleaching event in 1998. Since then, bleaching events have increased in frequency, with three events occurring in the years 2016–2020. Bleaching is predicted to occur three times a decade on the Great Barrier Reef if warming is kept to 1.5 °C, increasing to every other year at 2 °C.

With the increase of coral bleaching events worldwide, National Geographic noted in 2017, "In the past three years, 25 reefs—which comprise three-fourths of the world's reef systems—experienced severe bleaching events in what scientists concluded was the worst-ever sequence of bleachings to date."

In a study conducted on the Hawaiian mushroom coral Lobactis scutaria, researchers discovered that higher temperatures and elevated levels of photosynthetically active radiation (PAR) had a detrimental impact on its reproductive physiology. The purpose of this study was to investigate the survival of reef-building corals in their natural habitat, as coral reproduction is being hindered by the effects of climate change.

== Role of ocean acidification ==
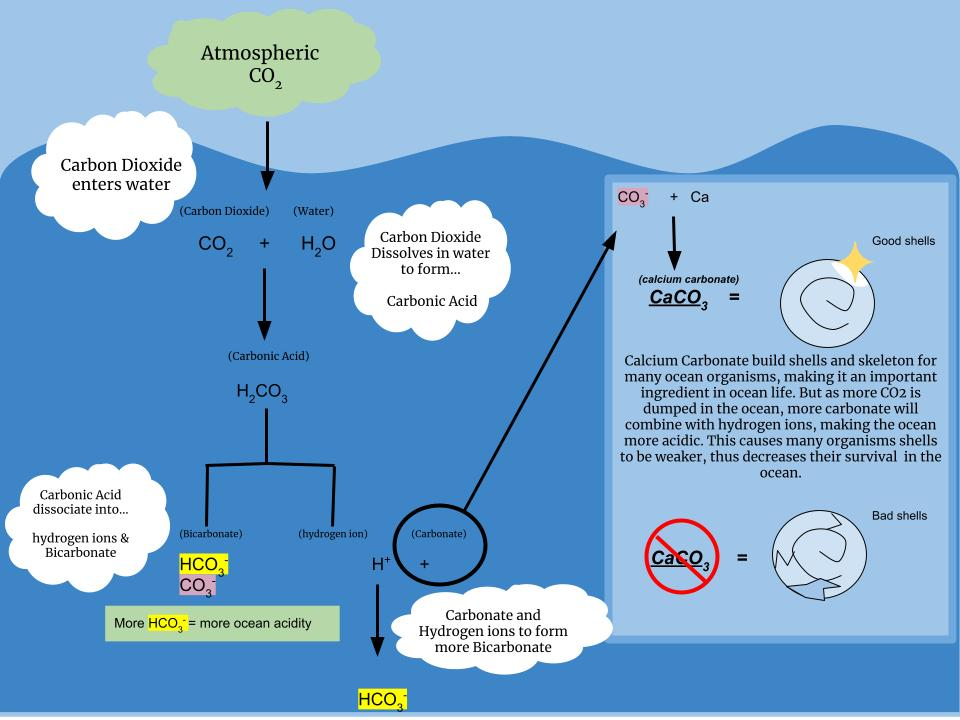
A visual depicting the process of atmospheric carbon dioxide contributing to ocean acidification.

The carbon cycle consists of fluxes between carbon sinks and the oceans of the Earth store large amounts of carbon. Because of this, when humans emit carbon into the atmosphere from burning fossil fuels a large sum of carbon will dissolve into the oceans. This addition disturbs the natural CO_{2}-carbonic acid equilibrium that buffers the ocean and results in a decrease in pH or "acidification". Increasing ocean acidification also works synergistically with thermal stress to induce bleaching effects. For example, an 8-week experiment on Heron Island off the coast of Australia observed 40-50% of crustose coralline algae and Acropora to be bleached following high-CO_{2} dosing. Acidification affects the corals' ability to create calcareous skeletons, essential to their survival. This is because ocean acidification decreases the amount of carbonate in the water, making it more difficult for corals to absorb the calcium carbonate they need for the skeleton. As a result, the resilience of reefs goes down, while it becomes easier for them to erode and dissolve. In addition, the increase in CO_{2} allows herbivore overfishing and nutrification to change coral-dominated ecosystems to algal-dominated ecosystems. A recent study from the Atkinson Center for a Sustainable Future found that with the combination of acidification and temperature rises, the levels of CO_{2} could become too high for coral to survive in as little as 50 years.

== Impacts ==
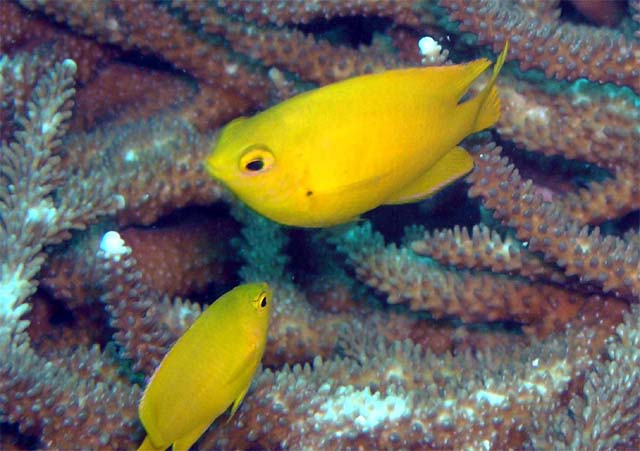
The lemon damselfish (Pomacentrus moluccensis) is a coral-associated species that has been shown to decline dramatically following coral bleaching.

Coral bleaching events and the subsequent loss of coral coverage often result in the decline of fish diversity. The loss of diversity and abundance in herbivorous fish particularly affects coral reef ecosystems. As mass bleaching events occur more frequently, fish populations will continue to homogenize. Smaller and more specialized fish species that fill particular ecological niches that are crucial for coral health are replaced by more generalized species. The loss of specialization likely contributes to the loss of resilience in coral reef ecosystems after bleaching events.

=== Economic and political impact ===
According to Brian Skoloff of The Christian Science Monitor, "If the reefs vanished, experts say, hunger, poverty and political instability could ensue." Coral reefs provide shelter to an estimated quarter of all ocean species. Since countless sea life depend on the reefs for shelter and protection from predators, the extinction of the reefs would ultimately create a domino effect that would trickle down to the many human societies that depend on those fish for food and livelihood. Experts estimate that coral reef services are worth up to $1.2 million per hectare which translates to an average of $172 billion per year. The benefits of coral reefs include providing physical structures such as coastal shoreline protection, biotic services within and between ecosystems, biogeochemical services such as maintaining nitrogen levels in the ocean, climate records, and recreational and commercial (tourism) services. There has been a 44% decline in coral reefs over the last 20 years in the Florida Keys and up to 80% in the Caribbean alone.

Coral reefs provide various ecosystem services, one of which is being a natural fishery, as many frequently consumed commercial fish spawn or live out their juvenile lives in coral reefs around the tropics. Thus, reefs are a popular fishing site and are an important source of income for fishers, especially small, local fisheries. As coral reef habitat decreases due to bleaching, reef associated fish populations also decrease, which affects fishing opportunities. A model from one study by Speers et al. calculated direct losses to fisheries from decreased coral cover to be around $49–69 billion, if human societies continue to emit high levels of greenhouse gases. But, these losses could be reduced for a consumer surplus benefit of about $14–20 billion, if societies chose to emit a lower level of greenhouse gases instead.

These economic losses also have important political implications, as they fall disproportionately on developing countries where the reefs are located, namely in Southeast Asia and around the Indian Ocean. It would cost more for countries in these areas to respond to coral reef loss as they would need to turn to different sources of income and food, in addition to losing other ecosystem services such as ecotourism. A study completed by Chen et al. suggested that the commercial value of reefs decreases by almost 4% every time coral cover decreases by 1% because of losses in ecotourism and other potential outdoor recreational activities. Restoration of reefs however can highly benefit these regions. A study conducted found that a restoration project in Maui led to a 47% increase in annual visits and an island-wide welfare gain of $2.9 million, averaging to a welfare gain of $26 per resident.

Coral reefs also act as a protective barrier for coastlines by reducing wave impact, which lowers the damage from storms, erosions, and flooding. It is estimated that reef crests dissipate an average of 86% of wave energy and when reef flats are factored in it can be up to 97% dissipated. Countries that lose this natural protection will lose more money because of the increased susceptibility of storms. This indirect cost, combined with the lost revenue from tourism, will result in enormous economic effects.

=== Mass bleaching events ===
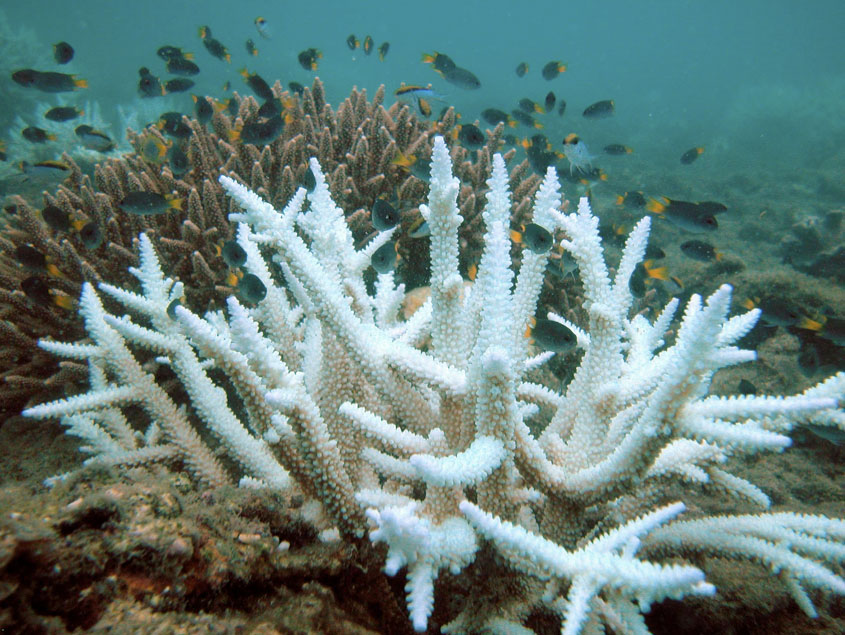
Bleached Acropora coral with normal coral in the background

Elevated sea water temperatures are the main cause of mass bleaching events. Sixty major episodes of coral bleaching have occurred between 1979 and 1990, with the associated coral mortality affecting reefs in every part of the world. In 2016, the longest coral bleaching event was recorded. The longest and most destructive coral bleaching event was because of the El Niño that occurred from 2014 to 2017. During this time, over 70 percent of the coral reefs around the world have become damaged.

Factors that influence the outcome of a bleaching event include stress-resistance which reduces bleaching, tolerance to the absence of zooxanthellae, and how quickly new coral grows to replace the dead. Due to the patchy nature of bleaching, local climatic conditions such as shade or a stream of cooler water can reduce bleaching incidence. Coral and zooxanthellae health and genetics also influence bleaching. Large coral colonies such as Porites are able to withstand extreme temperature shocks, while fragile branching corals such as Acropora are far more susceptible to stress following a temperature change. Corals consistently exposed to low-stress levels may be more resistant to bleaching.

The first globally recognized bleaching event took place in 1998 and 21% of reefs experienced bleaching-level heat stress. According to Clive Wilkinson of Global Coral Reef Monitoring Network of Townsville, Australia, in 1998 the mass bleaching event that occurred in the Indian Ocean region was due to the rising of sea temperatures by 2 °C coupled with the strong El Niño event in 1997–1998.

The 2023-2025 global coral bleaching event began in February 2023, becoming the fourth global coral bleaching event. It has affected reefs in at least 82 countries and territories and in all major ocean basins. In April 2024, the global coral bleaching event was confirmed by NOAA As of April 2025, 84% of reefs had been exposed to bleach-level heat. This event has led to severe damage, with coral mortality reaching up to 93% in areas like the Pacific coast near Mexico. The economic implications are profound, as coral reefs contribute approximately $2.7 trillion annually to the global economy, including $36 billion from tourism alone. Although a forthcoming shift to a La Niña phase may offer some relief, regions such as Florida have already experienced complete die-offs in some reefs, where temperatures have risen to 101°F (38.3°C). Moreover, the Great Barrier Reef is undergoing its fifth extensive bleaching event since 2016, underscoring the persistent and serious risks these vital ecosystems face.

The share of affected coral reefs worldwide by each of the four bleaching events has been estimated to be 20%, 35%, 56% and 54%.

=== Infectious disease ===
Following bleaching events, there has been a rise in the global disease outbreak among coral populations. This is due to the weakened state of the corals that makes them susceptible to infection caused by disease-carrying pathogens. The first large outbreak of disease in corals was observed in 1975 in Carysfort Reef in the Florida Keys and affected 6 reef-building species. A similar event occurred after bleaching in 2014 with a white-plague disease prevalence of 61% at 14 sites off the shores of Florida. Mortality varied by coral species however at least 13 species were affected by it.

Other infectious bacteria however can further increase bleaching in reefs. The species Vibrio shiloi are the bleaching agent of Oculina patagonica in the Mediterranean Sea, causing this effect by attacking the zooxanthellae. V. shiloi is infectious only during warm periods. Elevated temperature increases the virulence of V. shiloi, which then become able to adhere to a beta-galactoside-containing receptor in the surface mucus of the host coral. V. shiloi then penetrates the coral's epidermis, multiplies, and produces both heat-stable and heat-sensitive toxins, which affect zooxanthellae by inhibiting photosynthesis and causing lysis. During the summer of 2003, coral reefs in the Mediterranean Sea appeared to gain resistance to the pathogen, and further infection was not observed. The main hypothesis for the emerged resistance is the presence of symbiotic communities of protective bacteria living in the corals.

== By region ==
=== Pacific Ocean ===
==== Great Barrier Reef ====
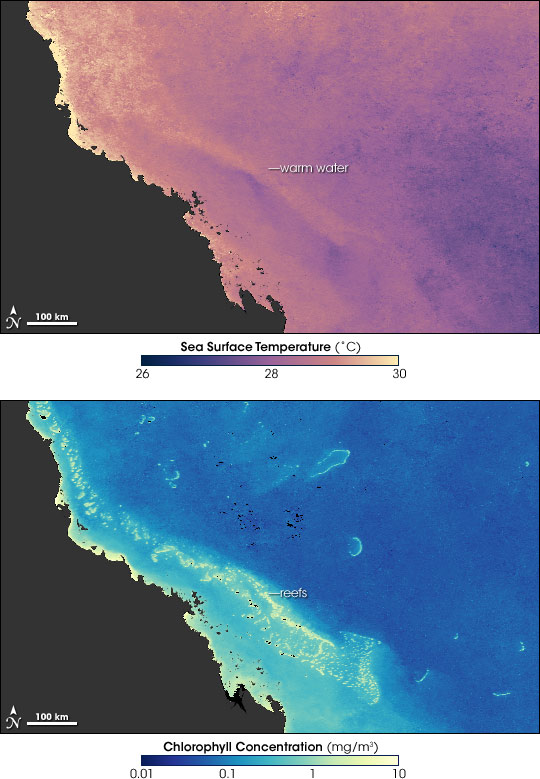
Two images of the Great Barrier Reef showing that the warmest water (top picture) coincides with the coral reefs (lower picture), setting up conditions that can cause coral bleaching

The Great Barrier Reef along the coast of Australia experienced bleaching events in 1980, 1982, 1992, 1994, 1998, 2002, 2006, 2016, 2017, 2022, 2024, and 2025. Some locations suffered severe damage, with up to 90% mortality. The most widespread and intense events occurred in the summers of 1998 and 2002, with 42% and 54%, respectively, of reefs bleached to some extent, and 18% strongly bleached. However, coral losses on the reef between 1995 and 2009 were largely offset by growth of new corals. An overall analysis of coral loss found that coral populations on the Great Barrier Reef had declined by 50.7% from 1985 to 2012, but with only about 10% of that decline attributable to bleaching, and the remaining 90% caused about equally by tropical cyclones and by predation by crown-of-thorns starfishes. A global mass coral bleaching has been occurring since 2014 because of the highest recorded temperatures plaguing oceans. These temperatures have caused the most severe and widespread coral bleaching ever recorded in the Great Barrier reef. The most severe bleaching in 2016 occurred near Port Douglas where on average more than half of the bleached corals died. In late November 2016, surveys of 62 reefs showed that long term heat stress from climate change caused a 29% loss of shallow water coral. The highest coral death and reef habitat loss was inshore and mid-shelf reefs around Cape Grenville and Princess Charlotte Bay. The IPCC's moderate warming scenarios (B1 to A1T, 2 °C by 2100, IPCC, 2007, Table SPM.3, p. 13) forecast that corals on the Great Barrier Reef are very likely to regularly experience summer temperatures high enough to induce bleaching.

A study from early 2024 tracked 462 colonies of corals at One Tree Island after they were affected by heat stress. At the end of the study in July 2024 only 92 coral colonies were unaffected by bleaching, while 193 were dead and 113 were showing signs of bleaching.

A 2026 study, conducted by researchers at the Australian Institute of Marine Science (AIMS), investigated 124 reefs along the Great Barrier Reef to find how much coral was lost as a result of extreme ocean temperatures, cyclones, and other disasters in 2024. The study found that there was major decrease in hard coral cover in the Great Barrier Reef between 2024 and 2025: a 24.8% decrease in the northern region, 14.0% in the central region, and 30.6% in the southern region, all relative to the amount of total coral. The northern and southern regions suffered their largest single-year decrease in coral coverage since 1986; this discovery is a significant setback that reverses about 5 years of coral recovery.

In 1996, Hawaii's first major coral bleaching occurred in Kaneohe Bay, followed by major bleaching events in the Northwest islands in 2002 and 2004. In 2014, biologists from the University of Queensland observed the first mass bleaching event, and attributed it to The Blob. In 2014 and 2015, a survey in Hanauma Bay Nature Preserve on Oahu found 47% of the corals suffering from coral bleaching and close to 10% of the corals dying. In 2014 and 2015, 56% of the coral reefs of the big island were affected by coral bleaching events. During the same period, 44% of the corals on west Maui were effected. On 24 January 2019, scientists with The Nature Conservancy found that the reefs had begun to stabilize nearly 4 years after the last bleaching event. According to the Division of Aquatic Resources (DAR), there was still a considerable amount of bleaching in 2019. On Oahu and Maui, up to 50% of the coral reefs were bleached. On the big island, roughly 40% of corals experienced bleaching in the Kona coast area. The DAR stated that the recent bleaching events have not been as bad as the 2014–2015 events. In 2020, the National Oceanic and Atmospheric Administration (NOAA) released the first-ever nationwide coral reef status report. The report stated that the northwestern and main Hawaiian islands were in "fair" shape, meaning the corals have been moderately impacted.

In May 2018, Hawaii passed the bill "SB-2571", banning the vending of sunscreen containing chemicals deemed conducive of coral bleaching on the island's local reefs. The bill was signed in by David Ige, of the Democratic party. A chemical deemed toxic in SB-2571 is the 'oxybenzone' (also banned; octinoxate), a chemical that becomes toxic to coral when exposed to sunlight. Up to one-tenth of the approximated 14,000 tons of sunscreen polluting coral reef areas contains oxybenzone, putting almost half of all coral reefs in danger of being exposed. Coral reefs show increased rates of bleaching in both controlled and natural environments when exposed to high levels of oxybenzone, found in many commercial sunscreen products. Another study showed that over time, the presence of oxybenzone in water will decrease a reef's strength to face other bleaching events such as increasing water temperatures. SB-2571 banned all sunscreen products with the exception of prescription products. Hawaii is the first U.S. state to introduce this type of ban, which went into effect in January 2021.

==== Jarvis Island ====
Jarvis Island is an island in the Pacific Ocean originally surrounded by 100 meters of ancient coral reef. Eight severe and two moderate bleaching events occurred between 1960 and 2016 in the coral community in Jarvis Island, with the 2015 to 2016 bleaching displaying the unprecedented severity in the record. The level of hard coral present decreased from 18.7% in 2015 to 0.4% in 2016. This event represented a 98% decline in coral reef coverage.

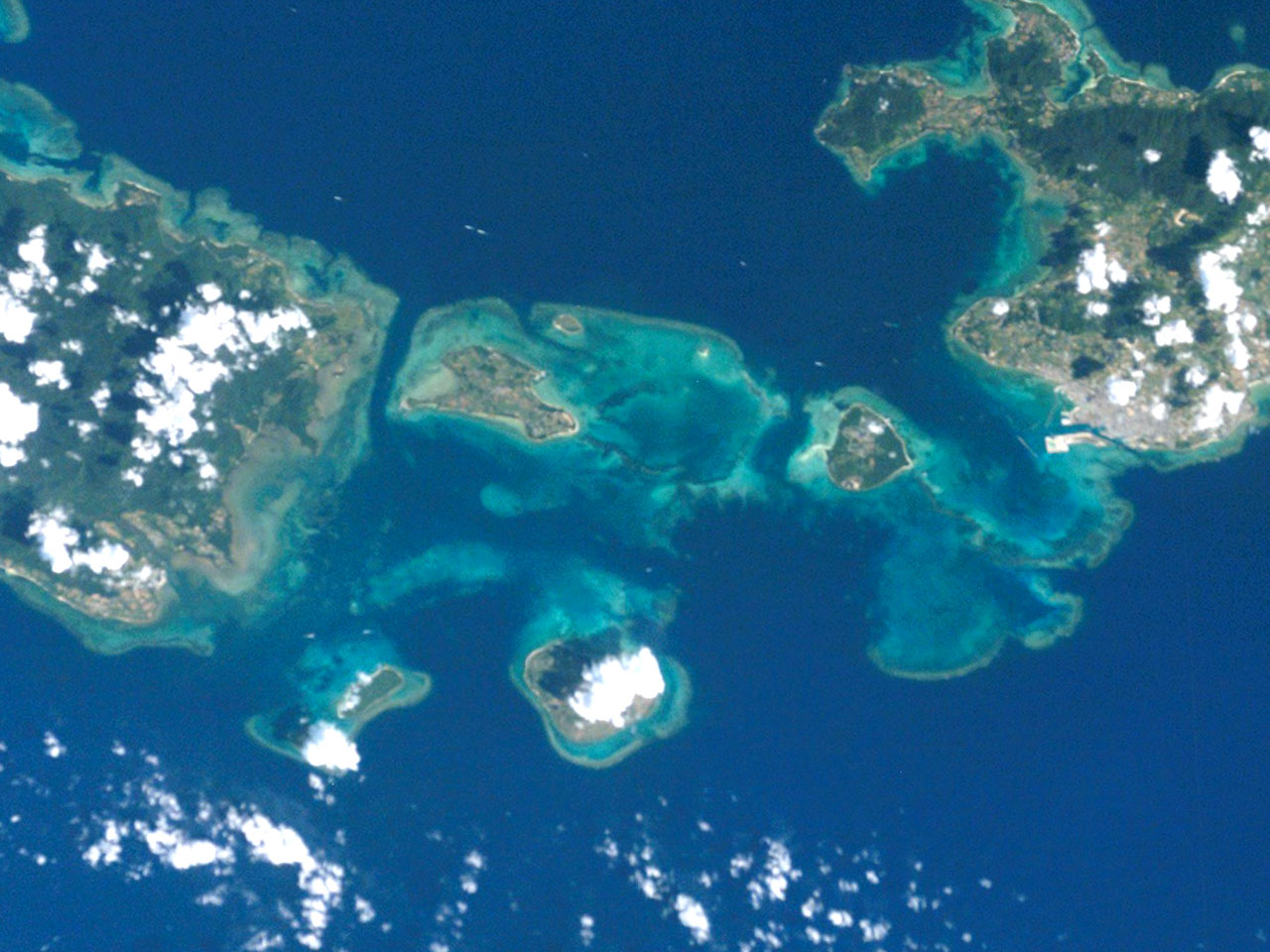
The Sekisei Lagoon has one of the largest reefs in Japan and has been the subject of a large amount of bleaching in recent years.

==== Japan ====
About 94% of the corals on Japan's Iriomote Island in the Ryukyu Islands bleached during a significant coral bleaching event that occurred in 2016. Prior to this event, the region typically experienced multiple typhoons during July and August. However, during this particular event, no typhoon was detected until September, suggesting a prolonged period of high seawater temperatures. According to the 2017 Japanese government report, almost 75% of Japan's largest coral reef in Okinawa has died from bleaching. The source explains that 90% of the Sekisei reef, a popular scuba diving location, was bleached in this event. The same location experienced an additional bleaching outbreak in the summer of 2022 and was reported at 30 sites within the lagoon.

In summer of 2024, rising sea temperatures were responsible for another major bleaching event that killed 61.2% of corals off Amami-Oshima island, Japan. The bleaching was brought on by sea temperatures 2° higher than in 2023.

=== Indian Ocean ===
Coral reef provinces have been permanently damaged by warm sea temperatures, most severely in the Indian Ocean. Up to 90% of coral cover has been lost in the Maldives, Sri Lanka, Kenya and Tanzania and in the Seychelles during the massive 1997–98 bleaching event. The Indian Ocean in 1998 reported 20% of its coral had died and 80% was bleached. The shallow tropical areas of the Indian Ocean are already experiencing what are predicted to be worldwide ocean conditions in the future. Coral that has survived in the shallow areas of the Indian Ocean may be proper candidates for coral restoration efforts in other areas of the world because they are able to survive the extreme conditions of the ocean.

==== Maldives ====
The Maldives has over 20,000 km^{2} of reefs, of which more than 60% of the coral has suffered from bleaching in 2016. Moreover, the Maldivian coral reef faces risks from the growing tourism industry and coastal construction, as well as land reclamation projects, alongside natural challenges such as diseases.

==== Thailand ====
Coral reef ecosystems are a notable feature of the western shoreline of the Gulf of Thailand. In 1998 and 2010, there were bleaching events in Thailand; the effects of both occurrences varied among coral species, with some exhibiting more resilience to the 2010 bleaching. In contrast to 1998, there was a more severe bleaching event in 2010. Thailand experienced a severe mass bleaching in 2010 which affected 70% of the coral in the Andaman Sea. Between 30% and 95% of the bleached coral died.

==== Indonesia ====
Acropora corals were dominant coral species of Indonesian reef system however they are extremely vulnerable to external stressors. A study was conducted to study effect of mass bleaching event in 2010 on Acropora. Post bleaching recovery is influenced by severity and frequency of the bleaching event. Research indicates that frequent moderate disturbances tend to affect Porites, while less frequent but stronger disturbances primarily impact Acropora. Consequently, Acropora demonstrates rapid regrowth in such instances.

In 2017, there was a study done on two islands in Indonesia to see how their coral cover was. One of the places was the Melinjo Islands and the other was the Saktu Islands. On Saktu Island, the lifeform conditions were categorized as bad, with an average coral cover of 22.3%. In the Melinjo Islands, the lifeform conditions were categorized as bad, with an average coral cover of 22.2%.

=== Atlantic Ocean ===
==== United States ====
During the 2005 mass bleaching event in Florida, the bleaching patterns varied among species. Colpophyllia natans and Diploria strigosa were particularly susceptible to thermal stress, whereas Stephanocoenia intersepta exhibited greater tolerance. Moreover, it was noted that larger coral colonies experienced more bleaching compared to smaller ones. The prediction suggests that mass bleaching events are likely to affect larger coral colonies even within the same community.In South Florida, a 2016 survey of large corals from Key Biscayne to Fort Lauderdale found that about 66% of the corals were dead or reduced to less than half of their live tissue.

==== Belize ====
The first recorded mass bleaching event that took place in the Belize Barrier Reef was in 1998, where sea level temperatures reached up to 31.5 °C (88.7 °F) from 10 August to 14 October. For a few days, Hurricane Mitch brought in stormy weather on 27 October but only reduced temperatures by 1 degree or less. During this time period, mass bleaching in the fore-reef and lagoon occurred. While some fore reef colonies suffered some damage, coral mortality in the lagoon was catastrophic.

The most prevalent coral in the reefs Belize in 1998 was the lettuce coral, Agaricia tenuifolia. On 22 and 23 October, surveys were conducted at two sites and the findings were devastating. Virtually all the living coral was bleached white and their skeletons indicated that they had died recently. At the lagoon floor, complete bleaching was evident among A. tenuifolia. Furthermore, surveys done in 1999 and 2000 showed a near total mortality of A. tenuifolia at all depths. Similar patterns occurred in other coral species as well. Measurements on water turbidity suggest that these mortalities were attributed to rising water temperatures rather than solar radiation.

==== Caribbean ====
Hard coral cover on reefs in the Caribbean have declined by an estimated 80%, from an average of 50% cover in the 1970s to only about 10% cover in the early 2000s. A 2013 study to follow up on a mass bleaching event in Tobago from 2010 showed that after only one year, the majority of the dominant species declined by about 62% while coral abundance declined by about 50%. However, between 2011 and 2013, coral cover increased for 10 of the 26 dominant species but declined for 5 other populations.

=== Other areas ===
Coral in the south Red Sea does not bleach despite summer water temperatures up to 34 °C (93 °F). Coral bleaching in the Red Sea is more common in the northern section of the reefs; the southern part of the reef has been plagued by coral-eating starfish, dynamite fishing and human impacts on the environment. In 1988, there was a massive bleaching event that affected the reefs in Saudi Arabia and Sudan, though the southern reefs were more resilient and it affected them very little. Previously, it was thought that the northern reef suffers more from coral bleaching and shows a fast turnover of coral, while the southern reef was thought to not suffer from bleaching as harshly and show more consistency. However, new research shows that where the southern reef should be bigger and healthier than the northern, it was not. This is believed to be because of major disturbances in recent history from bleaching events, and coral-eating starfish. In 2010, coral bleaching occurred in Saudi Arabia and Sudan, where the temperature rose 10 to 11 degrees. Certain taxa experienced 80% to 100% of their colonies bleaching, while some showed on average 20% of that taxa bleaching.

== Coral adaptation ==
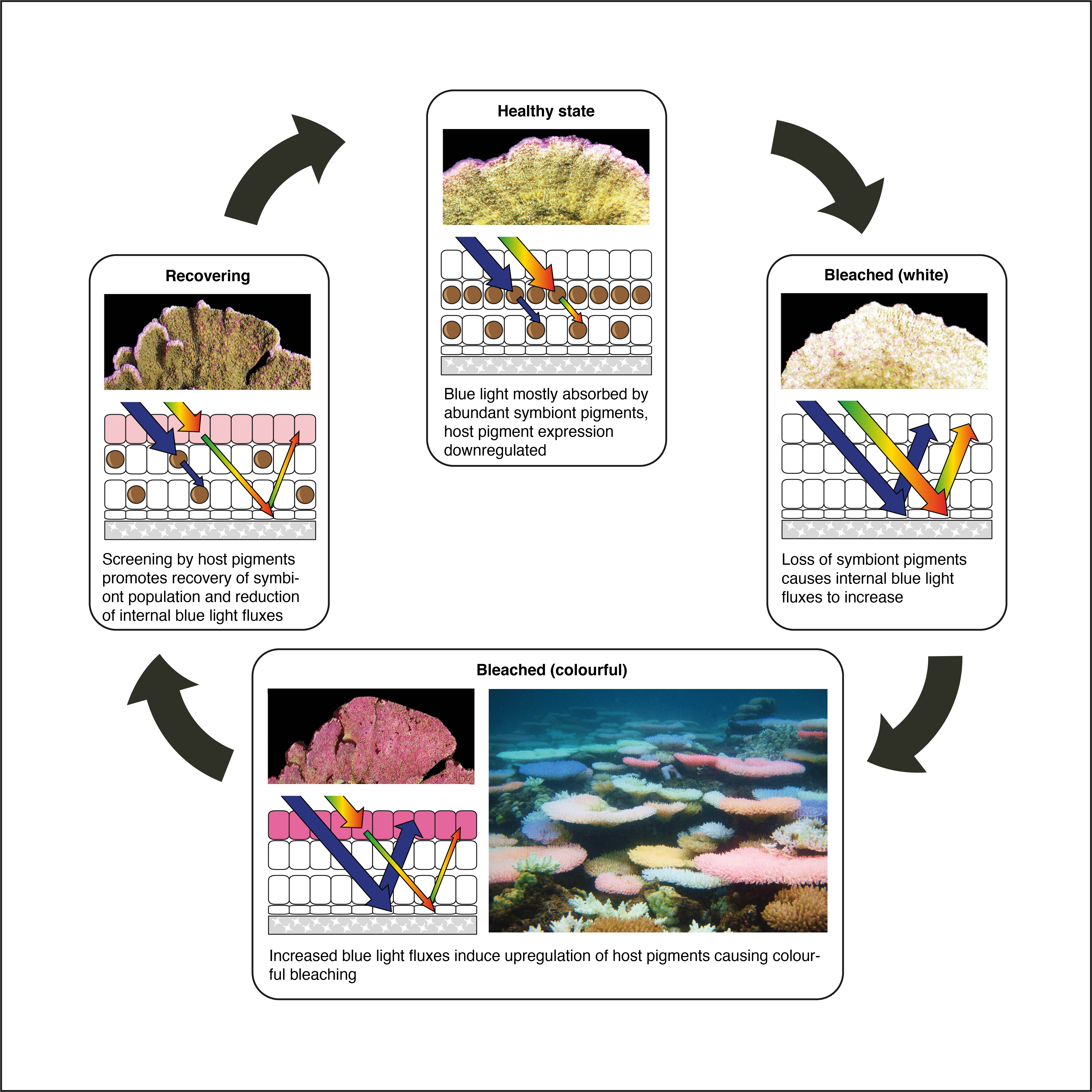
This schematic shows how bleaching can trigger the production of sun-screening pigments that are responsible for the bright colours observed during some bleaching events. In case of a mild or short episode of stress, the protective pigments may help the algal symbionts return to the coral after the stress episode has ended, helping the coral recover and survive the bleaching event.

In recent times, climate change has been linked to a notable increase in coral mortality. Moreover, mounting evidence suggests that bacteria associated with corals contribute to their ability to withstand thermal stress. Attempts have been undertaken to enhance coral resilience in the face of bleaching incidents. Since corals serve as the fundamental components of coral reefs, their decline significantly affects the endurance and composition of reefs directly affecting the reef-dwelling organisms.

In 2010, researchers at Penn State discovered corals that were thriving while using an unusual species of symbiotic algae in the warm waters of the Andaman Sea in the Indian Ocean. Normal zooxanthellae cannot withstand temperatures as high as was there, so this finding was unexpected. This gives researchers hope that with rising temperatures due to global warming, coral reefs will develop tolerance for different species of symbiotic algae that are resistant to high temperature, and can live within the reefs. In 2010, researchers from Stanford University also found corals around the Samoan Islands that experience a drastic temperature increase for about four hours a day during low tide. The corals do not bleach or die regardless of the high heat increase. Studies showed that the corals off the coast of Ofu Island near America Samoa have become trained to withstand the high temperatures. Researchers are now asking a new question: can we condition corals, that are not from this area, in this manner and slowly introduce them to higher temperatures for short periods of time and make them more resilient against rising ocean temperatures.

Certain mild bleaching events can cause coral to produce high concentrations of sun-screening pigments in order to shield themselves from further stress. Some of the pigments produced have pink, blue or purple hues, while others are strongly fluorescent. Production of these pigments by shallow-water corals is stimulated by blue light. When corals bleach, blue light inside the coral tissue increases greatly because it is no longer being absorbed by the photosynthetic pigments found inside the symbiotic algae, and is instead reflected by the white coral skeleton. This causes an increase in the production of the sun-screening pigments, making the bleached corals appear very colourful instead of white – a phenomenon sometimes called 'colourful coral bleaching'.

Increased sea surface temperature leads to the thinning of the epidermis and apoptosis of gastrodermis cells in the host coral. The reduction in apoptosis and gastrodermis is seen via epithelium, leading to up to a 50% loss in the concentration of symbionts over a short period of time. Under conditions of high temperature or increased light exposure, the coral will exhibit a stress response that includes producing reactive oxygen species, the accumulation of this if not removed by antioxidant systems will lead to the death of the coral. Studies testing the structures of coral under heat stressed environments show that the thickness of the coral itself greatly decreases under heat stress compared to the control. With the death of the zooxanthellae in the heat stressed events, the coral must find new sources to gather fixed carbon to generate energy, species of coral that can increase their carnivorous tendencies have been found to have an increased likelihood of recovering from bleaching events.

After the zooxanthellae leaves the coral, the coral structures are often taken over by algae due to their ability to outcompete the zooxanthella since they need less resources to survive. There is little evidence of competition between zooxanthellae and algae, but in the absence of zooxanthellae the algae thrives on the coral structures. Once algae takes over and the coral can no longer sustain itself, the structures often begin to decay due to ocean acidification. Ocean acidification is the process by which carbon dioxide is absorbed into the ocean, this decreases the amounts of carbonate ions in the ocean, a necessary ion corals use to build their skeletons. Corals go through processes of decalcifying and calcifying during different times of the day and year due to temperature fluctuations. Under current IPCC emission pathway scenarios, corals tend to disintegrate, and the winter months with cooler temperatures will not serve ample time for the corals to reform.

== Helping repair the damage ==
=== Monitoring coral bleaching and reef sea surface temperature ===
The US National Oceanic and Atmospheric Administration (NOAA) monitors for bleaching "hot spots", areas where sea surface temperature rises 1 °C or more above the long-term monthly average. The "hot spots" are the locations in which thermal stress is measured, and with the development of Degree Heating Week (DHW), the coral reef's thermal stress is monitored. Global coral bleaching is being detected earlier due to the satellite remote sensing of the rise of sea temperatures. It is necessary to monitor the high temperatures because coral bleaching events are affecting coral reef reproduction and normal growth capacity, as well as it weakening corals, eventually leading to their mortality. This system detected the worldwide 1998 bleaching event, that corresponded to the 1997–98 El Niño event. Currently, 190 reef sites around the globe are monitored by the NOAA, and send alerts to research scientists and reef managers via the NOAA Coral Reef Watch (CRW) website. By monitoring the warming of sea temperatures, the early warnings of coral bleaching alert reef managers to prepare for and draw awareness to future bleaching events. The first mass global bleaching events were recorded in 1998 and 2010, which was when the El Niño caused the ocean temperatures to rise and worsened the corals living conditions. The 2014–2017 El Niño was recorded to be the longest and most damaging to the corals, which harmed over 70% of our coral reefs. Over two-thirds of the Great Barrier Reef have been reported to be bleached or dead.

To accurately monitoring the extent and evolution of bleaching events, scientist are using underwater photogrammetric techniques to create accurate orthophoto of coral reefs transects and AI-assisted image segmentation with open source tools like TagLab to identify from these photos the health status of the corals.

=== Recovery and macroalgal regime shifts ===
After corals experience a bleaching event to increased temperature stress some reefs are able to return to their original, pre-bleaching state. Reefs either recover from bleaching, where they are recolonized by zooxanthellae, or they experience a regime shift, where previously flourishing coral reefs are taken over by thick layers of macroalgae. This inhibits further coral growth because the algae produces antifouling compounds to deter settlement and competes with corals for space and light. As a result, macroalgae forms stable communities that make it difficult for corals to grow again. Reefs will then be more susceptible to other issues, such as declining water quality and removal of herbivore fish, because coral growth is weaker. Discovering what causes reefs to be resilient or recover from bleaching events is of primary importance because it helps inform conservation efforts and protect coral more effectively.

A primary subject of research regarding coral recovery pertains to the idea of super-corals, otherwise referred to as the corals that live and thrive in naturally warmer and more acidic regions and bodies of water. When transplanted to endangered or bleached reefs, their resilience and irradiance can equip the algae to live among the bleached corals. As Emma Camp, a National Geographic Explorer, marine bio-geochemist and an ambassador for Biodiversity for the charity IBEX Earth, suggests, the super-corals could have the capability to help with the damaged reefs long-term. While it can take 10 to 15 years to restore damaged and bleached coral reefs, the super-corals could have lasting impacts despite climate change as the oceans rise in temperature and gain more acidity. Bolstered by the research of Ruth Gates, Camp has looked into lower oxygen levels and the extreme, unexpected habitats that reefs can be found in across the globe.

Corals have shown to be resilient to short-term disturbances. Recovery has been shown in after storm disturbance and crown of thorns starfish invasions. Fish species tend to fare better following reef disturbance than coral species as corals show limited recovery and reef fish assemblages have shown little change as a result of short-term disturbances. In contrast, fish assemblages in reefs that experience bleaching exhibit potentially damaging changes. One study by Bellwood et al. notes that while species richness, diversity, and abundance did not change, fish assemblages contained more generalist species and less coral dependent species. Responses to coral bleaching are diverse between reef fish species, based on what resources are affected. Rising sea temperature and coral bleaching do not directly impact adult fish mortality, but there are many indirect consequences of both. Coral-associated fish populations tend to be in decline due to habitat loss; however, some herbivorous fish populations have seen a drastic increase due to the increase of algae colonization on dead coral. Studies note that better methods are needed to measure the effects of disturbance on the resilience of corals.

Until recently, the factors mediating the recovery of coral reefs from bleaching were not well studied. Research by Graham et al. (2015) studied 21 reefs around Seychelles in the Indo-Pacific in order to document the long-term effects of coral bleaching. After the loss of more than 90% of corals due to bleaching in 1998 around 50% of the reefs recovered and roughly 40% of the reefs experienced regime shifts to macroalgae dominated compositions. After an assessment of factors influencing the probability of recovery, the study identified five major factors: density of juvenile corals, initial structural complexity, water depth, biomass of herbivorous fishes, and nutrient conditions on the reef. Overall, resilience was seen most in coral reef systems that were structurally complex and in deeper water.

The ecological roles and functional groups of species also play a role in the recovery of regime shifting potential in reef systems. Coral reefs are affected by bioeroding, scraping, and grazing fish species. Bioeroding species remove dead corals, scraping species remove algae and sediment to further future growth, grazing species remove algae. The presence of each type of species can influence the ability for normal levels of coral recruitment which is an important part of coral recovery. Lowered numbers of grazing species after coral bleaching in the Caribbean has been likened to sea-urchin-dominated systems which do not undergo regime shifts to fleshy macroalgae dominated conditions.

There is always the possibility of unobservable changes, or cryptic losses or resilience, in a coral community's ability to perform ecological processes. These cryptic losses can result in unforeseen regime changes or ecological flips. More detailed methods for determining the health of coral reefs that take into account long-term changes to the coral ecosystems and better-informed conservation policies are necessary to protect coral reefs in the years to come.

=== Rebuilding coral reefs ===
Research is being done to help slow down the mortality rate of corals. Worldwide projects are being completed to help replenish and restore the coral reefs. Current coral restoration efforts include microfragmentation, coral farming, and relocation. The population of corals is rapidly declining, so scientists are doing experiments in coral growth and research tanks to help replenish their population. These research tanks mimic the coral reefs natural environment in the ocean. They are growing corals in these tanks to use for their experiments, so no more corals are being harmed or taken from the ocean. They are also transplanting the successfully grown corals from the research tanks and putting them into the areas of the ocean where the reefs are dying out. An experiment is being done in some coral growth and research tanks by Ruth Gates and Madelaine Van Oppen. They are trying to make "super corals" that can withstand some of the environmental factors that the corals are currently dying from. Van Oppen is also working on developing a type of algae that will have a symbiotic relationship with corals and can withstand water temperature fluctuations for long periods of time. This project may be helping to replenish our reefs, but the growing process of corals in research tanks is very time-consuming. It can take at least 10 years for the corals to fully grow and mature enough to where they will be able to breed. Following Ruth Gates' death in October 2018, her team at the Gates Coral Lab at the Hawaiʻi Institute of Marine Biology continues her research on restoration efforts. Continuing research and restoration efforts at the Gates Coral Lab focuses on the effects of beneficial mutations, genetic variation, and relocation via human assistance on the resilience of coral reefs. As of 2019, the Gates Coral Lab team determined that large-scale restoration techniques would not be effective; localized efforts to restore coral reefs on an individual basis are tested to be more realistic and effective while research is conducted to determine the best ways to combat coral destruction on a mass scale.

Other research is also being conducted to enhance the thermal tolerance of corals. Work has demonstrated that corals that can withstand thermal stress are less susceptible to bleaching events. One general aim is to identify thermal resistant existing coral-associated Symbiodiniaceae and induce that condition in others symbionts, leading to more corals are able to withstand changes in heat. Symbiodiniaceae can be modified in vitro over the course of roughly 40 generations but previously there were struggles successfully achieving thermal tolerance when added to the coral. In 2020, scientists reported to have evolved 10 clonal strains of a common coral microalgal endosymbionts at elevated temperatures for 4 years, increasing their thermal tolerance for climate resilience. Three of the strains increased the corals' bleaching tolerance after reintroduction into coral host larvae. Their strains and findings may potentially be relevant for the adaptation to and mitigation of climate change and further tests of algal strains in adult colonies across a range of coral species are planned. Another method of approach is to focus on heat-resistant genetics in the corals themselves. Differences on the transcriptomic level have been noted in Acropora millepora experimentally exposed to sub-lethal temperatures. In 2021, researchers demonstrated that probiotics can help coral reefs mitigate heat stress, indicating that such could make them more resilient to climate change and mitigate coral bleaching. There are concerns about the consequences of producing and introducing genetically modified corals. They remain, however, one of the main options for helping rebuild the coral reefs.

==== Economical and political perspective for rebuilding ====
The Paris Agreement has offered reasons for hope by pledging nations worldwide to maintain the rise in global average temperatures significantly below 2°C compared to pre-industrial levels, with concerted endeavors aimed at capping the increase at 1.5°C. In 2010, the Convention on Biological Diversity's (CBD) Strategic Plan for Biodiversity 2011–2020 created twenty distinct targets for sustainable development for post-2015. Target 10 indicates the goal of minimizing "anthropogenic pressures on coral reefs". Two programs were looked at, one that reduces coral reef loss by 50% that has a capital cost of $684 million and a recurrent cost of $81 million. The other program reduces coral reef loss by 80 percent and has a capital cost of $1.036 billion with recurring costs of $130 million. CBD acknowledges that they may be underestimating the costs and resources needed to achieve this target due to lack of relevant data but nonetheless, the cost–benefit analysis shows that the benefits outweigh the costs by a great enough amount for both programs (benefit cost ratio of 95.3 and 98.5) that "there is ample scope to increase outlays on coral protection and still achieve a benefit to cost ratio that is well over one".

=== Marine protected areas ===
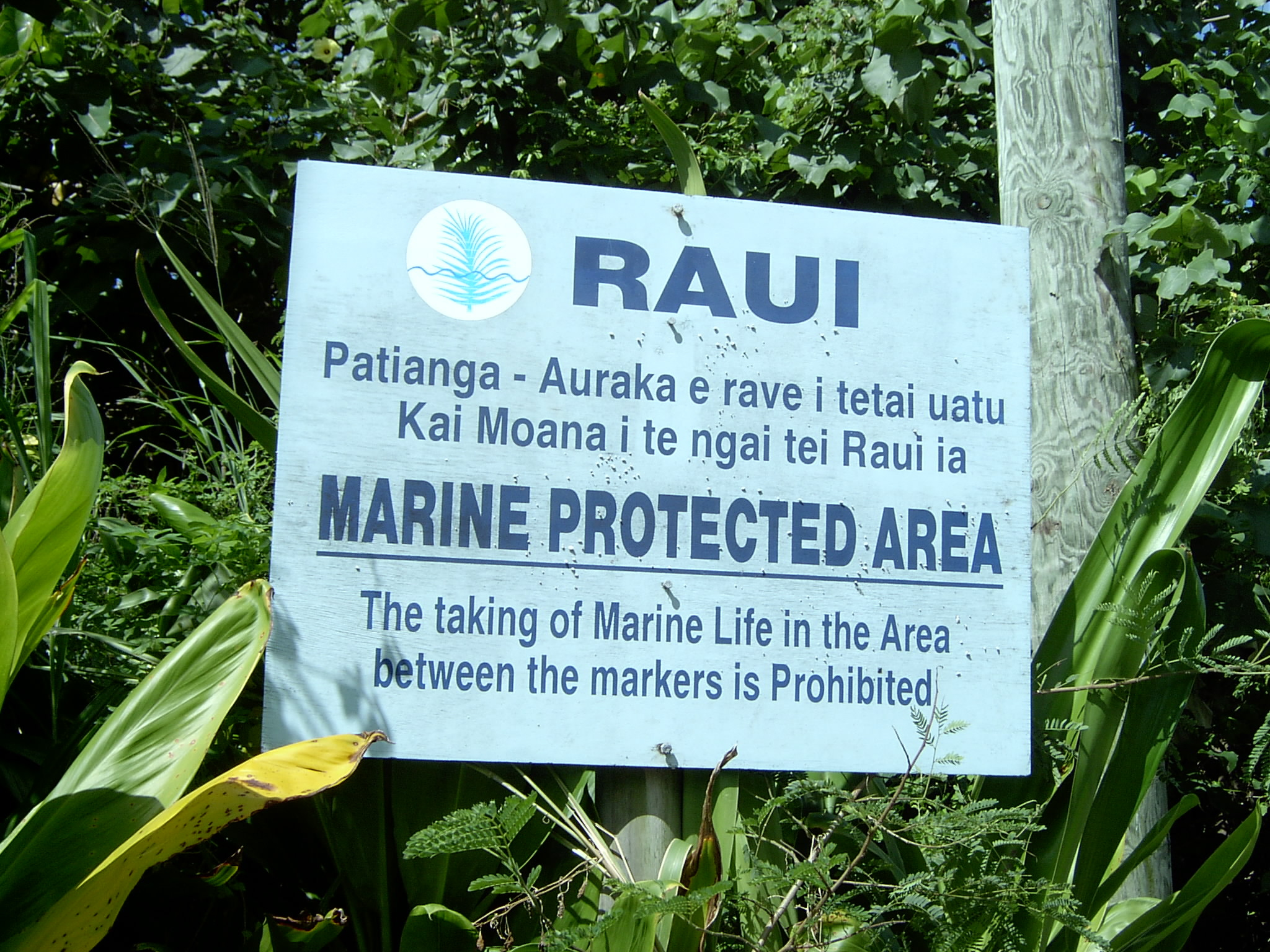
Example of a Marine Protected Area sign on Rarotonga Island in Hawaii

Marine Protected Areas (MPAs) are sectioned-off areas of the ocean designated for protection from human activities such as fishing and un-managed tourism. According to NOAA, MPAs currently occupy 26% of U.S. waters. MPAs have been documented to improve and prevent the effects of coral bleaching in the United States. In 2018, research by coral scientists in the Caribbean concluded that areas of the ocean managed/protected by government had improved conditions that coral reefs were able to flourish in. MPAs defend ecosystems from overfishing, which allows multiple species of fish to thrive and deplete seaweed density, making it easier for young coral organisms to grow and increase in population/strength. From this study, a 62% increase in coral populations was recorded due to the protection of an MPA. Higher populations of young coral increase the longevity of a reef, as well as its ability to recover from extreme bleaching events.

=== Local impacts and solutions to coral bleaching ===
There are a number of stressors locally impacting coral bleaching, including sedimentation, continual support of urban development, land change, increased tourism, untreated sewage, and pollution. To illustrate, increased tourism is good for a country, however, it also comes with costs. An example is the Dominican Republic which relies heavily on its coral reefs to attract tourists resulting in increased structural damage, over fishing, nutrient pollution, and an increase in diseases to the coral reefs. As a result, the Dominican Republic has implemented a sustainable management plan for its land and marine areas to regulate ecotourism.

== See also ==
- Effects of climate change on oceans
