= Villa Ispahan =

Historic building in Monaco

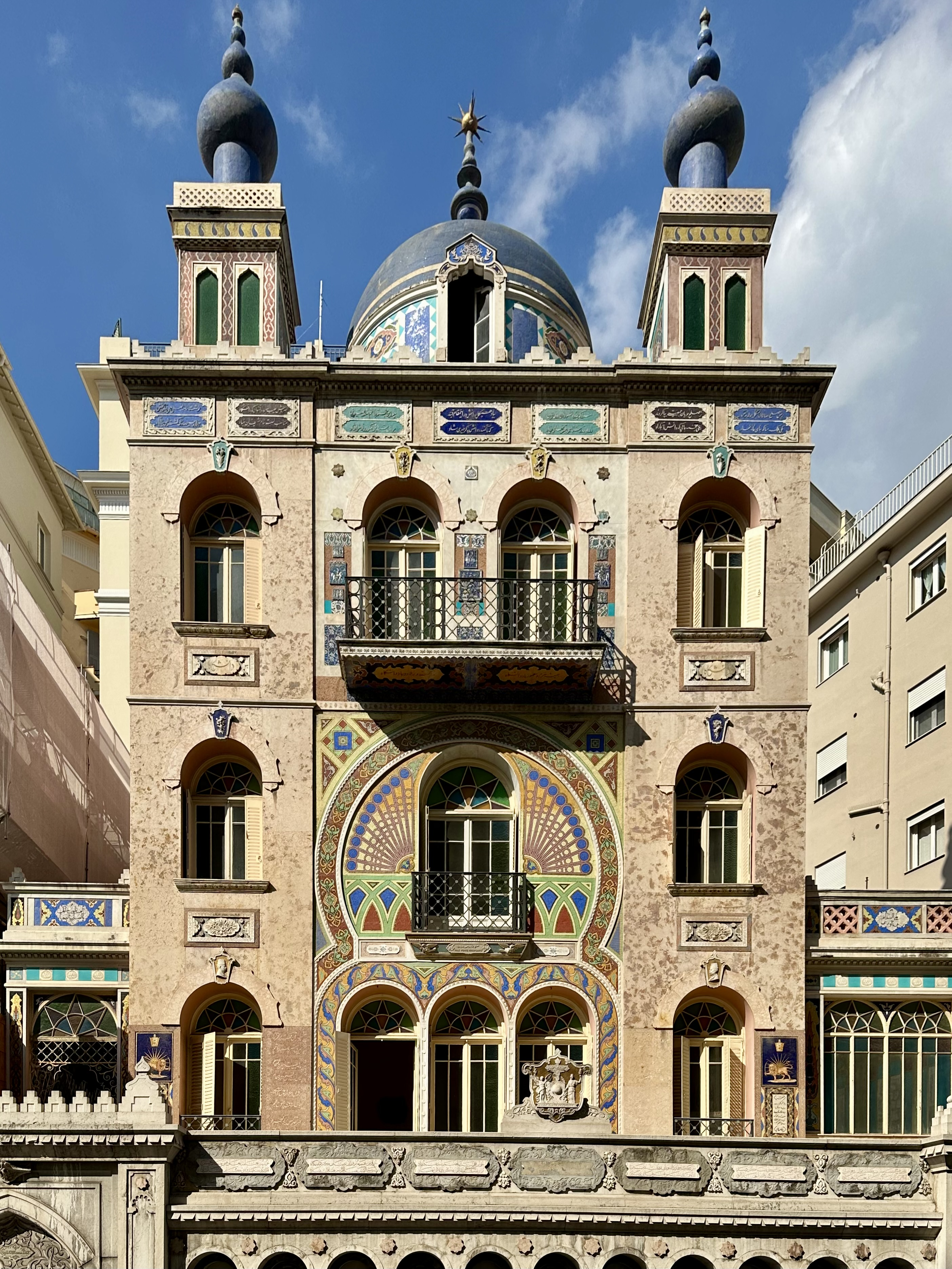

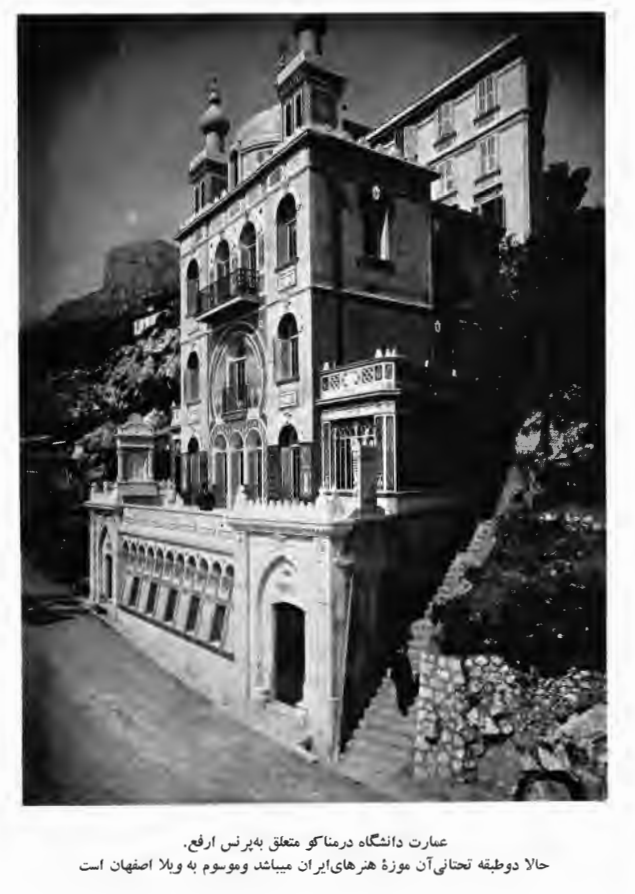
Villa Ispahan in 1966

The Villa Danichgah (French: [vila daniʃɡa], from Persian دانشگاه Dāneshgāh, “Dānesh's place”), nowadays nicknamed and better-known as Villa Ispahan (French: [vila ispaɑ̃]; Iranian Persian: ویلای اسپهان Vilâ-ye Espahân) is a Persian-style Belle Époque building in Les Moneghetti, Monaco, at 57 Boulevard du Jardin Exotique. It was built in 1910 by the Iranian diplomat Prince Reza Khan Arfa Danesh (Dānish). The villa, with its blue minarets, is modelled on the Shah Mosque in Isfahan, Iran. It is decorated with mosaics, coloured glass and motifs including the Lion and Sun. A museum of Iranian Art and Culture in the 1960s, the Villa Ispahan was listed for sale in 2019 with 9 rooms spread over 548 m^{2}.

The building was home to a museum of Iranian art, sculptures, and objets d'art curated by Baroness Marie Roze Trenk, grand-daughter of opera singer Marie Roze. Prince Arfa's collection was sold by Sotheby's at Monte Carlo's Sporting d'Hiver club in 1983.

The Villa Ispahan is the site of the Consulate of Indonesia in Monaco.
