= International Coral Reef Initiative =

The International Coral Reef Initiative (ICRI) is an informal partnership among nations, international organisations and non-government organisations to help protect coral reefs globally. It aims to implement Chapter 17 of Agenda 21, Aichi Target 10 of the Convention on Biological Diversity's 10-year Strategic Plan, and other relevant internationally agreed objectives and targets. It does so by:

- raising global awareness on the plight of coral reefs around the world
- promoting the sharing of best practices in coral reef management and building capacity of coral reef managers around the world
- ensuring that coral reefs are included in relevant international deliberations.

It is the "only global entity solely devoted to coral reefs".

== History ==
ICRI was established in 1994 at the initiative of eight founding nations: Australia, France, Japan, Jamaica, the Philippines, Sweden, the United Kingdom, and the United States. It was launched at the First Conference of the Parties of the Convention on Biological Diversity, held in the Bahamas in December 1994, and subsequently announced at the high level segment of the Intersessional Meeting of the United Nations Commission on Sustainable Development in April 1995. The first General Meeting of members was held in Dumaguete, Philippines, in June 1995 where ICRI's foundational documents were adopted: its "Call to Action" and "Framework for Action" for achieving sustainable management of coral reefs and related ecosystems. The "Call to Action" was renewed in 1998 at the first International Tropical Marine Ecosystems Management Symposium held in Townsville, Australia and endorsed by over 300 delegates from 49 nations.

A Continuing Call to Action (and associated Framework for Action) was further adopted at ICRI's 28th General Meeting in October 2013 in Belize. The Framework for Action requires the complete participation and dedication by all involved parties. The Framework for Action calls on participating parties to back all actions with substantial productive effects on coral reefs, monitor and manage human-related pursuits that result in degradation of coral reefs and its ecosystems, and acknowledge the importance of coral reefs to different cultures and regions. The Framework also requires the commitment to coastal management, especially with the involvement of local communities, and the participation in crucial examination and analysis to sustain and protect coral reefs on a widespread capacity. The ICRI is aware that the different geographical regions of the world have different problems facing their coral reefs. The ICRI has created different geographical seminars in order to customize the "Call to Action" and "Framework for Action" protocols for each region of the globe. The global seminars also include the importance of government involvement in the protection of coral reefs. The ICRI has noted the deficiency of recognizing the extensive help the scientific community around the globe has contributed to protecting coral reefs. The International Coral Reef Initiative has adapted over time to reach more needs of the Federal and Community levels of protecting coral reefs while aiding the International and Regional levels with uninterrupted oversight of coral reefs.

== Governance ==
The Initiative functions through a rotating Secretariat hosted by member nations; since 2001 the Secretariat has been hosted in partnership by a 'developed' nation and a 'developing' nation. The Secretariat is responsible for organising General Meetings of members, drafting documents, coordinating membership, and liaising with relevant international organisations. It presents of Plan of Action (or hosting objectives) for its hosting period at the inception of its hosting period. The Secretariat has been hosted by the following Nations:

- the United States of America (1995–96)
- Australia (1997–98)
- France (1999–2000)
- Sweden and the Philippines (2001–03)
- The United Kingdom and the Seychelles (2003–05)
- Japan and Palau (2005–07)
- The United States of America and Mexico (2007–09)
- France and Samoa (2009–2011)
- Australia and Belize (2012–14)
- Japan and Thailand (2014–16).

The governing body of ICRI is its General Meetings, held at least annually and where members can adopt decision, resolutions and recommendations on specific topics. ICRI has also encouraged the holding of regional meetings and workshops to develop coordinated regional responses to coral reef threats. The most active region in this regard has been East Asia which holds annual regional ICRI workshops.

== Networks and committees ==
ICRI has established Operational Networks and temporary Ad Hoc Committees, which are working groups set-up on a temporary basis to progress specific issues or tackle specialized topics related to coral reef management. The most well-known Operational Network is the Global Coral Reef Monitoring Network which produces global and regional reports on the status of coral reefs on a regular basis.

== ICRI and the United Nations ==
Although ICRI is not a United Nations body, it is regularly cited in UN documents such as Secretary General Reports. Most recently, it was cited in resolution adopted by the United Nations General Assembly at its 67th session in November 2012.

The International Coral Reef Initiative has had non-legally binding frameworks and agreements as well as legally binding agreements to create a basis of cooperation on the international level for protecting coral reefs and marine life. One of the most relevant legally binding agreements made for the ICRI is the United Nations Convention on the Law of the Sea (UNCLOS). The UNCLOS was established in 1982 and is often referred to the "constitution of the oceans". UNCLOS has been designed for widespread access across the globe and a great number of the articles are committed to the safeguarding of marine environments. These articles of the United Nations Convention on the Law of the Sea include the responsibility for countries to avert, decrease, and monitor land-based causes of pollution like litter, soil pollution, oil spills and other toxic chemicals, etc.
