= List of corals of the Solomon Islands =

This is a list of corals of the Solomon Islands. The baseline survey of marine biodiversity within the national territory of Solomon Islands that was carried out in 2004, found 474 species of corals in the Solomons as well as nine species which could be new to science. This is the second highest diversity of corals in the World, second only to the Raja Ampat Islands in eastern Indonesia.

The baseline survey (published in 2006) identified the following coral varieties as being present in the Solomons:

Family:	Genus:	Number of species:	
Acroporidae	Acropora	83	Acropora cytherea
Acroporidae	Anacropora	3	
Acroporidae	Astreopora	8	
Acroporidae	Montipora	24	
Agariciidae	Pavona	10	Pavona maldivensis
Astrocoeniidae	Stylocoeniella	3	
Diploastreidae	Diploastrea	1	Diploastrea heliopora
Dendrophylliidae	Turbinaria	6	Turbinaria mesenterina
Euphylliidae	Euphyllia	4	
Fungiidae	Cycloseris	7	Cycloseris cyclolites
Fungiidae	Heliofungia	1	Heliofungia actiniformis
Fungiidae	Fungia	1	Fungia fungites
Fungiidae	Ctenactis	3	Ctenactis echinata
Lobophylliidae	Acanthastrea	5	Acanthastrea echinata
Lobophylliidae	Lobophyllia	5	Lobophyllia hemprichii
Merulinidae	Hydnophora	5	Hydnophora exesa
Merulinidae	Favites	8	Favites pentagona
Merulinidae	Goniastrea	7	Goniastrea favulus
Merulinidae	Platygyra	6	Platygyra contorta
Merulinidae	Oulophyllia	2	Oulophyllia crispa
Merulinidae	Leptoria	2	
Merulinidae	Plesiastrea	1	
Merulinidae	Leptastrea	5	
Merulinidae	Cyphastrea	5	Cyphastrea serailia
Merulinidae	Echinopora	6	
Pocilloporidae	Pocillopora	9	Pocillopora verrucosa
Pocilloporidae	Seriatopora	5	Seriatopora caliendrum
Pocilloporidae	Stylophora	2	
Poritidae	Porites	15	Porites lutea
Poritidae	Goniopora	9	Goniopora columna
Poritidae	Alveopora	3	Alveopora spongiosa
