= Larger star coral =

Larger star coral may refer to two different species of coral:

- Favites abdita, a species of coral in the family Merulinidae
- Favites complanata, a species of coral in the family Merulinidae
