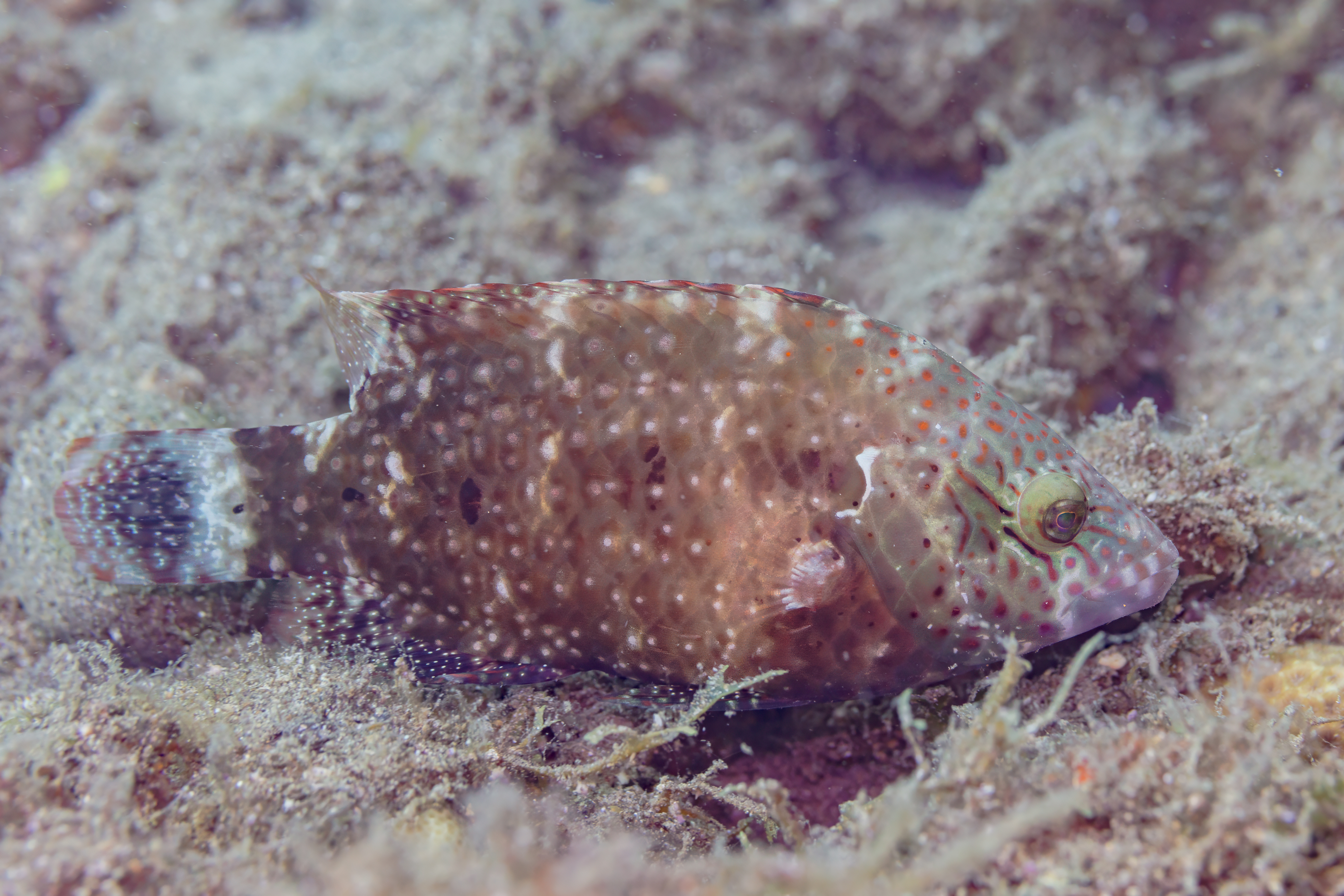

Conservation status
- Least Concern (IUCN 3.1)

Scientific classification
- Kingdom: Animalia
- Phylum: Chordata
- Class: Actinopterygii
- Order: Labriformes
- Family: Labridae
- Genus: Oxycheilinus
- Species: O. digramma

Binomial name
- Oxycheilinus digramma (Lacépède, 1801)

Synonyms
- Labrus digramma Lacépède, 1801; Cheilinus digrammus (Lacépède, 1801); Oxycheilinus digrammus (Lacépède, 1801); Sparus radiatus Bloch & J. G. Schneider, 1801; Cheilinus coccineus Rüppell, 1828; Cheilinus commersonii E. T. Bennett, 1832; Cheilinus diagrammus Valenciennes, 1840; Cheilinus lacrymans Valenciennes, 1840; Cheilinus radiatus Valenciennes, 1840; Cheilinus roseus Valenciennes, 1840

= Cheek-lined wrasse =

Species of fish

The cheek-lined wrasse, bandcheek wrasse, or cheek-lined Maori wrasse (Oxycheilinus digramma), is a species of wrasse native to the Indian Ocean and the western Pacific Ocean. It is of minor importance to local commercial fisheries and can also be found in the aquarium trade. The fish grows to about 40 cm (16 in) in standard length. The side of the fish's head has horizontal stripes, while the front of the head has red spots. Coloring of the fish varies from pale gray to purple. Aquarium specimens are less tense than their wild counterparts.

Oxycheilinus digramma lives in coral reefs, sheltered inland areas, and lagoons at depths from 3 to 60 m (9.8 to 196.9 ft), possibly to 120 m (390 ft). Juveniles of O. digramma have been observed to live among the tentacles of the mushroom coral Heliofungia actiniformis. This species eats sea urchins, molluscs, and crustaceans. It uses other fish as a moving blind to approach its prey.
