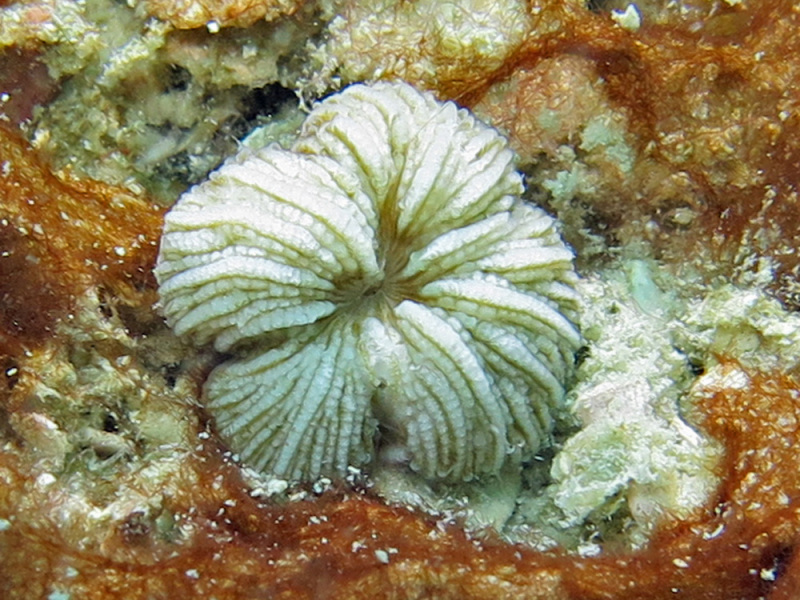

Conservation status
- Least Concern (IUCN 3.1)

Scientific classification
- Kingdom: Animalia
- Phylum: Cnidaria
- Subphylum: Anthozoa
- Class: Hexacorallia
- Order: Scleractinia
- Family: Fungiidae
- Genus: Cycloseris
- Species: C. distorta

Binomial name
- Cycloseris distorta (Michelin, 1842)

Synonyms
- Cycloseris mexicana Durham, 1947; Diaseris distorta (Michelin, 1842); Diaseris pulchella Verrill, 1866; Fungia distorta Michelin, 1842; Fungia patella Döderlein, 1902

= Cycloseris distorta =

Species of disc coral

Cycloseris distorta is a species of disc coral in the family Fungiidae. It is a free-living, solitary coral and is native to the tropical and subtropical Indo-Pacific region where it is found on soft sediment in shallow water.

== Taxonomy ==
This coral was first described by the French naturalist Jean-Louis Hardouin Michelin de Choisy in 1842 who named it Fungia distorta. It was later transferred to the genus Diaseris becoming Diaseris distorta. In 2011, research using molecular methods resulted in Diaseris being absorbed into the genus Cycloseris.

== Description ==
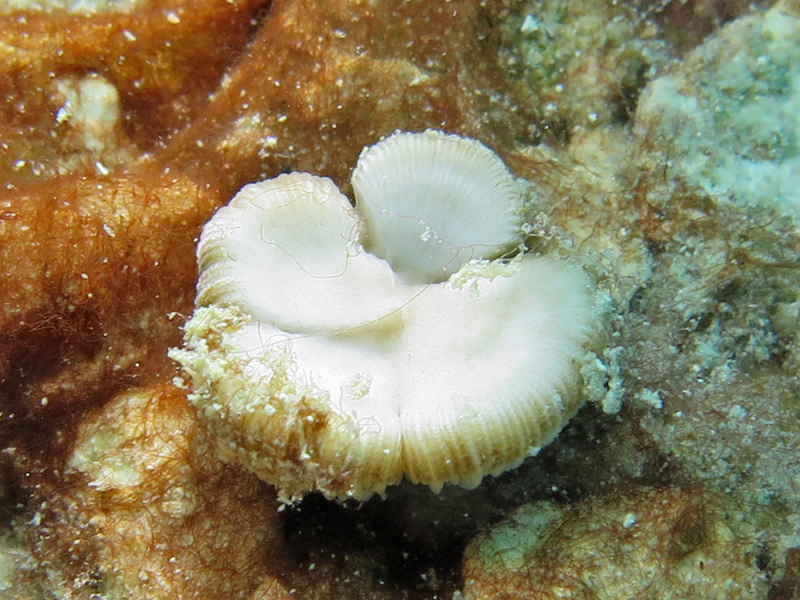
Underside. The fan-shaped segments can break off and form a new polyp, a form of asexual reproduction.

Cycloseris distorta is a solitary, free-living coral that grows to a diameter of about 80 mm (3 in). The large polyp is irregular in shape and has a central mouth from which radiate wedge-shaped segments. The corallite (the stony cup in which the polyp sits) has numerous beaded septa (partitions) of varying heights. The polyp can absorb water from its surroundings and inflate itself to several times its original size. When the tentacles are extended to feed, it has a fuzzy appearance. This coral is some shade of cream or pale fawn, and may be mottled.

== Distribution and habitat ==
Cycloseris distorta occurs in the tropical and subtropical Indian Ocean and Pacific Ocean. Its range extends from the east coast of Africa and Madagascar to Sri Lanka, Malaysia, Indonesia, northern and eastern Australia and the Galapagos Islands. It occurs on soft sediments, usually at depths of 25 m (80 ft) or less, but occasionally down to about 80 m (260 ft).

In the Galapagos Islands, this species is known from a single location. The population there, estimated to be several hundred thousand individuals, is so dense that the corals are sometimes piled on top of each other. On a nearby island, there is a location where there are large numbers of dead skeletons of this species, but no living individuals.

== Ecology ==
Individual corals are either male or female. Fecundity is high and broadcast spawning takes place four to eight times per year. Asexual reproduction by fission is an important means of reproduction for this species. The coral may be fragmented due to physical forces, such as storms, but it is also capable of autotomy, causing itself to break apart through selective weakening of certain parts of the skeleton.
