= Anacropora matthai =

Conservation status
- Vulnerable (IUCN 3.1)

Scientific classification
- Kingdom: Animalia
- Phylum: Cnidaria
- Subphylum: Anthozoa
- Class: Hexacorallia
- Order: Scleractinia
- Family: Acroporidae
- Genus: Anacropora
- Species: A. matthai

Binomial name
- Anacropora matthai Pillai, 1973

Species of briar coral

Anacropora matthai is a species of briar coral in the family Acroporidae. This species is found in the Central Indo-Pacific in waters off Solomons, Japan, East China Sea, Eastern Australia, Fiji, Palau, and Pohnpei in shallow tropical reef environments, in depths of 8 to 20 m (26 to 66 ft). The species is named after George Matthai.

== Description ==
The branches of A. matthai are 5 mm (0.20 in) thick, and are straight, with brown and pale brown coloring.

== Conservation ==
The range of A. matthai occurs in one protected marine area, but its population is still in decline, so it has been listed as vulnerable by the IUCN Red List. Its threats include residential and commercial development, shipping lanes, aquatic resources being harvested, invasive species, diseases, pollution, and climate change.
