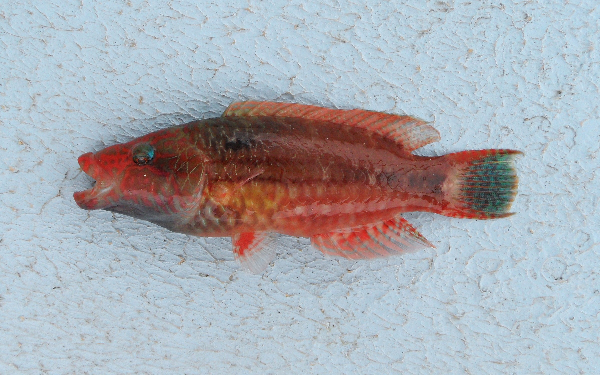

Conservation status
- Least Concern (IUCN 3.1)

Scientific classification
- Kingdom: Animalia
- Phylum: Chordata
- Class: Actinopterygii
- Order: Labriformes
- Family: Labridae
- Genus: Oxycheilinus
- Species: O. mentalis

Binomial name
- Oxycheilinus mentalis (Rüppell, 1828 )

Synonyms
- Cheilinus mentalis Rüppell, 1828

= Oxycheilinus mentalis =

Species of fish

Oxycheilinus mentalis (mental wrasse) is a species of wrasse found in the Western Indian Ocean, in the Red Sea and Gulf of Aden.

It has been known to change its colouration to match species of non-predatory parrotfish and surgeonfish. It then swims with these harmless model species and predates upon passing fish. This is a form of aggressive mimicry. Without a model fish, the mental wrasse has a reddish pink colour.
