= Favites spinosa =

Conservation status
- Least Concern (IUCN 3.1)

Scientific classification
- Kingdom: Animalia
- Phylum: Cnidaria
- Subphylum: Anthozoa
- Class: Hexacorallia
- Order: Scleractinia
- Family: Merulinidae
- Genus: Favites
- Species: F. spinosa

Binomial name
- Favites spinosa (Klunzinger, 1879)

Synonyms
- Prionastraea spinosa Klunzinger, 1879

Species of coral

Favites spinosa is a species of stony coral in the family Merulinidae. It is native to the Indo-Pacific region, its range extending from the eastern coast of Africa through the Indian Ocean to the Western and Central Pacific Ocean.

== Description ==
Favites spinosa forms small, solid rounded colonies. The corallites (stony cups in which the polyps are seated) are deep with steep walls. The septa (stony ridges between the corallite walls) are straight and widely separated, alternately long and short, and rough due to the distinctive serrated teeth. The corallite walls are off-white and the corallite centres are dark.

== Status ==
The International Union for Conservation of Nature has rated the conservation status of this coral as "vulnerable". This is because it is a generally uncommon species with a scattered distribution throughout its wide range; its depth limit is 10 m (30 ft) and this makes it particularly vulnerable to habitat disturbance, bleaching and coral disease.
