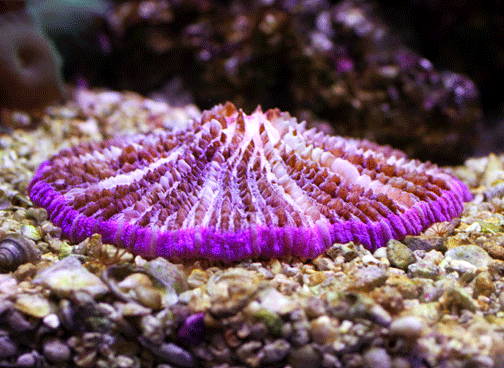
- Cycloseris fragilis

Scientific classification
- Kingdom: Animalia
- Phylum: Cnidaria
- Subphylum: Anthozoa
- Class: Hexacorallia
- Order: Scleractinia
- Family: Fungiidae
- Genus: Cycloseris; Milne-Edwards & Haime, 1849

Species
- See text

Synonyms
- Diaseris Milne Edwards & Haime, 1849; Fungia (Cycloseris) Milne Edwards & Haime, 1849; Hemicyathus Seguenza, 1862

= Cycloseris =

Genus of corals

Cycloseris is a genus of solitary disc corals in the family Fungiidae. They are found in the Indo-Pacific. They inhabit the lower reef slopes, and the areas between reefs with soft sediments. They tolerate turbid waters.

== Description ==
Corals in the genus Cycloseris are mostly solitary and free living, some attaining 10 centimetres (4 in) in diameter. The discs are either round or oval and the central mouth, which is surrounded by tentacles, may be a slit. The polyp sits in a calcareous cup, the corallite, and only extends its tentacles to feed at night. The septa are vertical skeletal elements inside the corallite wall and the costae unite the septae at the base of the coral. In the genus Cycloseris, both are thick but have fine teeth and are characteristic of the different species. Cycloseris can be confused with specimens of the related genus Fungia but the former are free living, even as juveniles, while the latter bear a scar showing where they were attached when young.

The genus was reclassified in 2012, to include some species that had previously been classified in the genus Coscinaraea, that are colonial with multiple mouths, in addition to the original species that are free living, with a single central mouth.

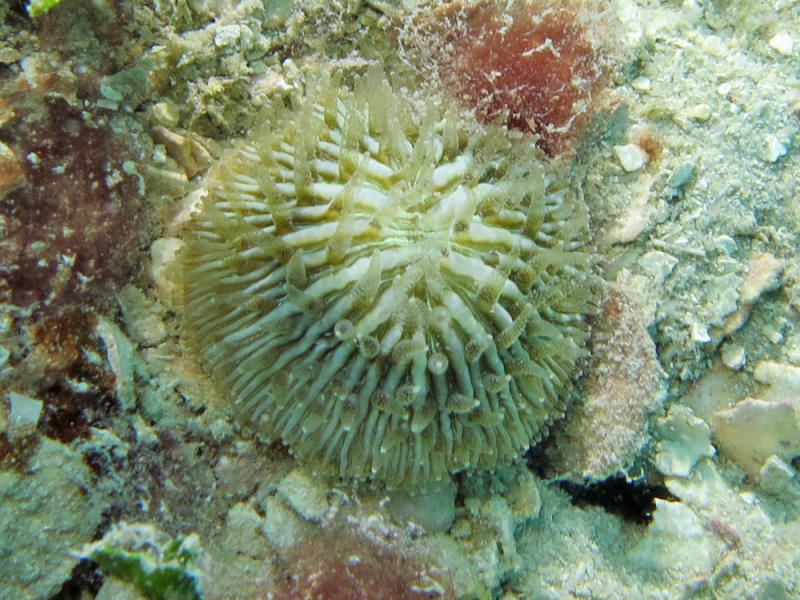
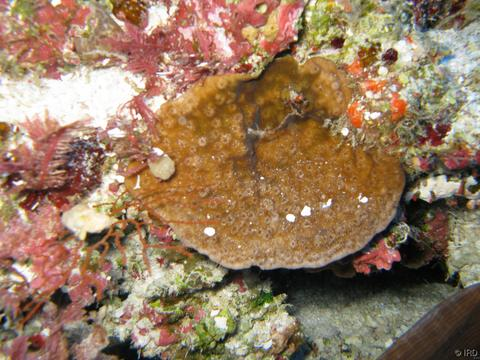
C. cyclolites (left) has a single, central mouth, whereas C. wellsi (right) has multiple mouths.

== Species ==
The World Register of Marine Species currently lists the following extant species:

- Cycloseris boschmai Hoeksma, 2014
- Cycloseris costulata (Ortman, 1889)
- Cycloseris curvata (Hoeksema, 1989)
- Cycloseris cyclolites (Lamarck, 1801)
- Cycloseris distorta (Michelin, 1843)
- Cycloseris explanulata (Van der Horst, 1922)
- Cycloseris fragilis (Alcock, 1893)
- Cycloseris mokai (Hoeksema, 1989)
- Cycloseris sinensis Milne Edwards & Haime, 1851
- Cycloseris somervillei (Gardiner, 1909)
- Cycloseris tenuis (Dana, 1846)
- Cycloseris vaughani (Boschma, 1923)
- Cycloseris wellsi (Veron & Pichon, 1980)

The Encyclopedia of Life lists the following extinct species:

- †Cycloseris brazzanensis Oppenheim 1901 (Eocene)
- †Cycloseris costulata (Ortmann, 1889)
- †Cycloseris escosurae Mallada 1887
- †Cycloseris hungaricus Kolosvary 1956
- †Cycloseris lamellata Kühn 1933
- †Cycloseris minuta Reuss 1870
- †Cycloseris perezi Haime 1850
- †Cycloseris striata Duncan 1880
