= Anacropora spinosa =

Conservation status
- Endangered (IUCN 3.1)

Scientific classification
- Kingdom: Animalia
- Phylum: Cnidaria
- Subphylum: Anthozoa
- Class: Hexacorallia
- Order: Scleractinia
- Family: Acroporidae
- Genus: Anacropora
- Species: A. spinosa

Binomial name
- Anacropora spinosa Rehberg, 1892

Species of coral

Anacropora spinosa is a species of briar coral that can be found in the central Indo-Pacific, Southeast Asia, the Solomon Islands, Japan, the East China Sea and the oceanic west Pacific Ocean. It is also found in Rodrigues and the Andaman Islands. It occurs in shallow reefs, from depths of 5–15 m. It is particularly susceptible to coral bleaching, disease and reduction of coral reef habitats.

== Description ==
Anacropora spinosa forms bushy clumps of contorted branches up to 10 mm (0.4 in) thick which taper to a point. The corallites are long, crowded and irregular, mostly being untapered. Spines project beneath the corallites. The colour of this coral is usually brownish, and the tips of the branches are often white.

== Status ==
Anacropora spinosa is found in shallow reef habitats and is particularly susceptible to coral bleaching and coral disease and is slow to recover. It is an uncommon species and the population is thought to be trending downwards. The International Union for Conservation of Nature has assessed its conservation status as being "endangered".
