= Anacropora forbesi =

Conservation status
- Vulnerable (IUCN 3.1)

Scientific classification
- Kingdom: Animalia
- Phylum: Cnidaria
- Subphylum: Anthozoa
- Class: Hexacorallia
- Order: Scleractinia
- Family: Acroporidae
- Genus: Anacropora
- Species: A. forbesi

Binomial name
- Anacropora forbesi Ridley, 1884

Synonyms
- Anacropora erecta Bernard, 1897; Anacropora firma Nemenzo & Ferraris, 1982; Anacropora gracilis Quelch, 1886; Anacropora reptans Bernard, 1897; Anacropora solida Quelch, 1886

Species of coral

Anacropora forbesi is a species of briar coral that can be found in the tropical western and central Indo-Pacific region. It is the type species of the genus Anacropora.

== Description ==
Anacropora forbesi is a small coral, branching dichotomously, with slender branches up to 10 mm (0.4 in) in diameter, slightly tapered and with blunt tips. The coenosteum (the stony skeleton of the coral) is smooth and the lower lips of the corallites (the stony cups in which the polyps sit) project slightly. This coral is usually a light brown colour with pale tips to the branches. It is closely related to Acropora and Montipora corals, but differs from them in not having a terminal axial corallite at the tip of the branches.

== Distribution and habitat ==
Anacropora forbesi is native to the western and central Indo-Pacific. Its range extends from Madagascar, the east coast of Africa and the Red Sea to the northeastern Indian Ocean, Australia, Malaysia, Indonesia, Japan, the Philippines and the East China Sea. It also occurs in Palau and Micronesia. It grows on shallow water reefs, often in turbid waters, and in deeper areas between reefs on soft substrates. It sometimes inhabits exposed reef slopes. It occurs at depths down to about 25 m (80 ft). This is a vigorous fast-growing coral which can form lawn-like patches on the reef to the exclusion of other species.

== Status ==
This coral has a very wide range and is a common species. However, the genus is particularly prone to storm damage and coral bleaching, and all corals are threatened by reef degradation, climate change and ocean acidification. The International Union for Conservation of Nature has assessed its conservation status as being of least concern, while recommending further evaluation to check its level of resilience.
