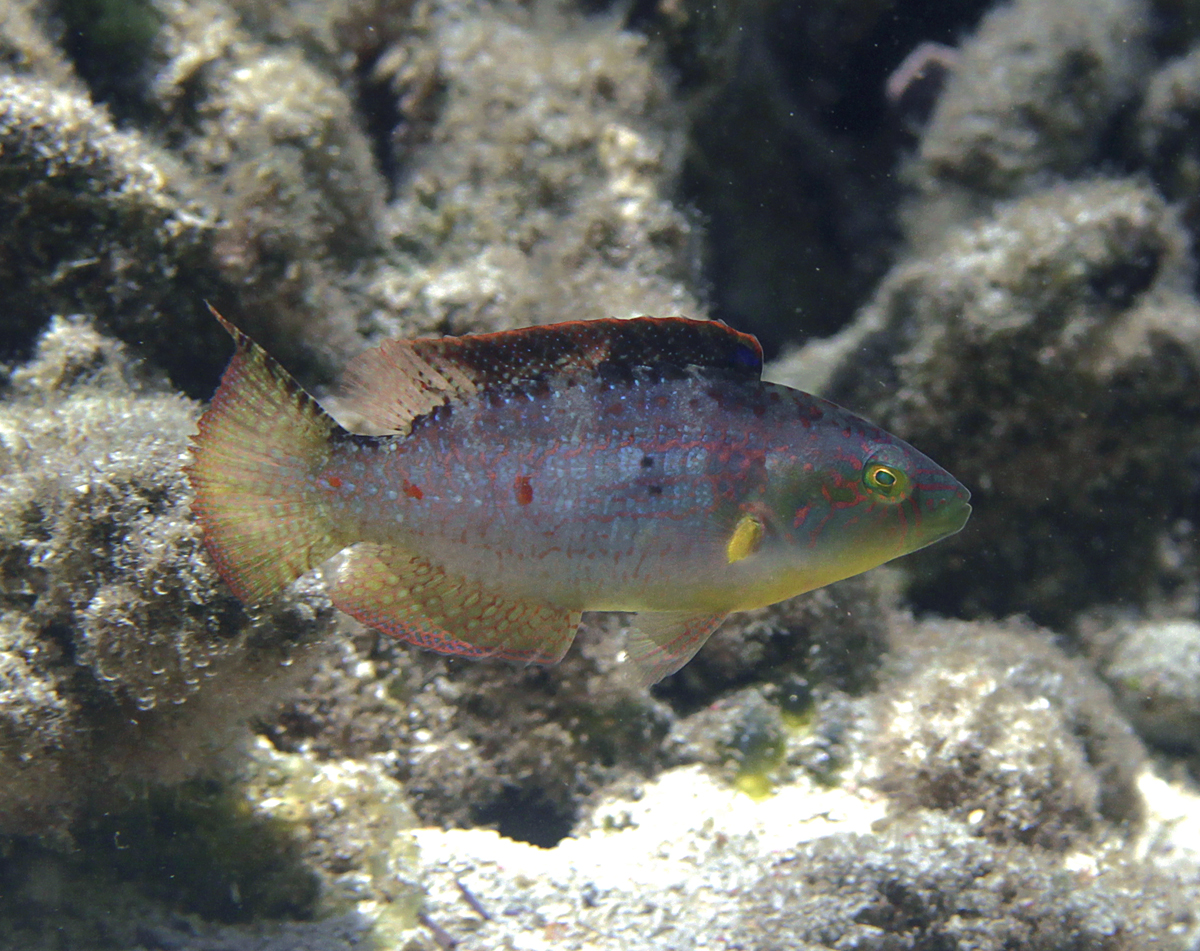
- Oxycheilinus bimaculatus

Scientific classification
- Kingdom: Animalia
- Phylum: Chordata
- Class: Actinopterygii
- Order: Labriformes
- Family: Labridae
- Subfamily: Cheilininae
- Genus: Oxycheilinus; T. N. Gill, 1862

Type species
- Cheilinus arenatus Valenciennes, 1840

= Oxycheilinus =

Genus of fishes

Oxycheilinus is a genus of fish in the family Labridae found in the Indian and Pacific Ocean.

== Species ==
There are currently 10 recognized species in this genus:

Species	Common name	Image
Oxycheilinus arenatus (Valenciennes, 1840)	Speckled maori wrasse	
Oxycheilinus bimaculatus (Valenciennes, 1840)	Two-spot maori wrasse	
Oxycheilinus celebicus (Bleeker, 1853)	Celebes maori wrasse	
Oxycheilinus digramma (Lacépède, 1801)	Cheek-lined maori wrasse	
Oxycheilinus lineatus J. E. Randall, Westneat & M. F. Gomon, 2003		
Oxycheilinus mentalis (Rüppell, 1828)	Mental maori wrasse	
Oxycheilinus nigromarginatus J. E. Randall, Westneat & M. F. Gomon, 2003	Black-margin maori wrasse	
Oxycheilinus orientalis (Günther, 1862)	Oriental maori wrasse	
Oxycheilinus samurai Y. Fukui, Muto & Motomura, 2016		
Oxycheilinus unifasciatus (Streets, 1877)	Ringtail maori wrasse	
