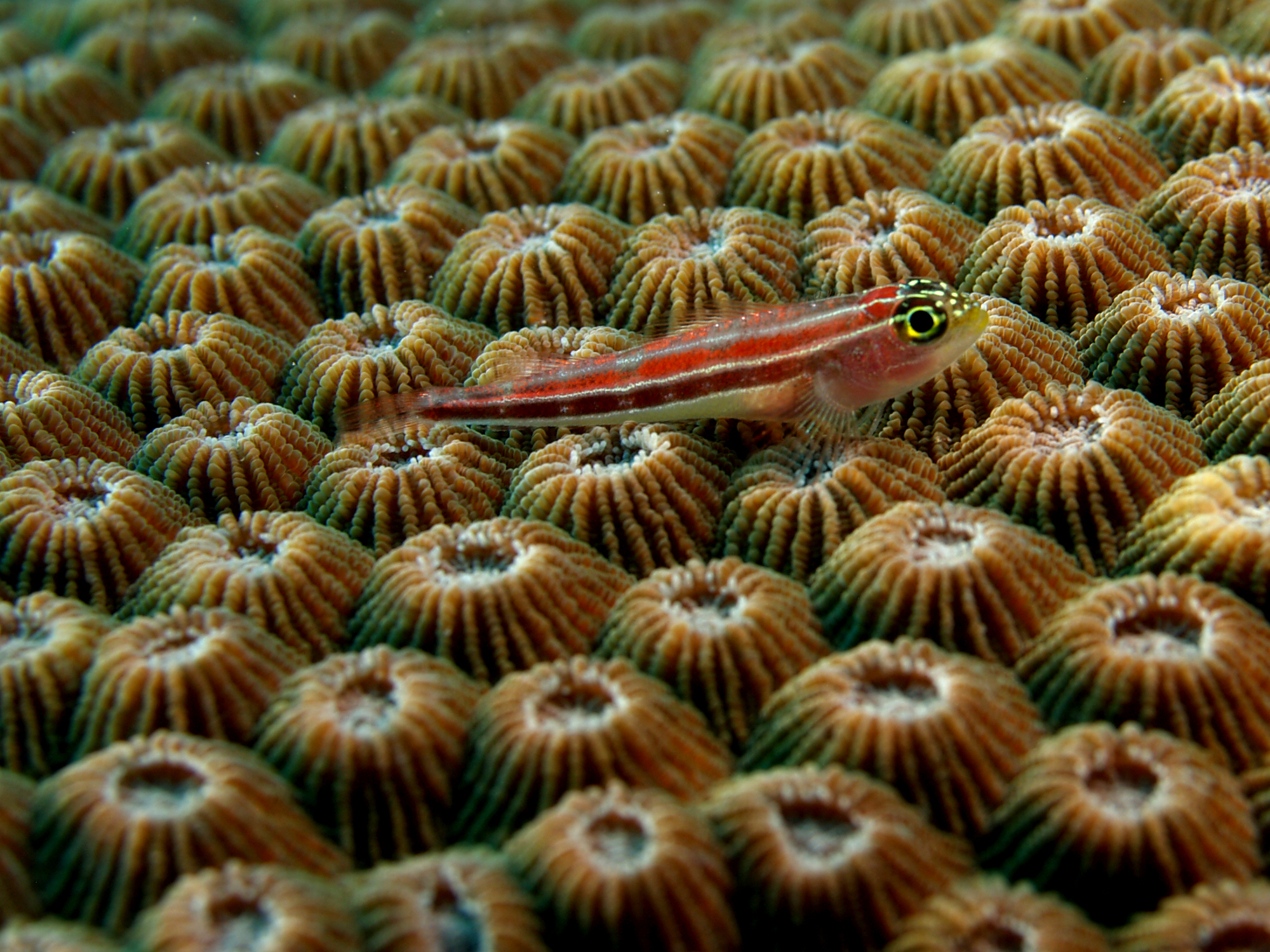
- Diploastrea heliopora

Scientific classification
- Kingdom: Animalia
- Phylum: Cnidaria
- Subphylum: Anthozoa
- Class: Hexacorallia
- Order: Scleractinia
- Family: Diploastreidae; Chevalier & Beauvais, 1987
- Genus: Diploastrea; Matthai, 1914

= Diploastrea =

Genus of corals

Diploastrea is the only genus of corals in its monotypic family, Diploastreidae, containing the extant Diploastrea heliopora (Lamarck, 1816) and the extinct Diploastrea polygonalis (Martin, 1880).
