= Favites valenciennesi =

Conservation status
- Endangered (IUCN 3.1)
- CITES Appendix II

Scientific classification
- Kingdom: Animalia
- Phylum: Cnidaria
- Subphylum: Anthozoa
- Class: Hexacorallia
- Order: Scleractinia
- Family: Merulinidae
- Genus: Favites
- Species: F. valenciennesi

Binomial name
- Favites valenciennesi (Milne Edwards & Haime, 1849)

Synonyms
- List: Phymastrea profundior Milne Edwards & Haime, 1849; Phymastrea valenciennesi Milne Edwards & Haime, 1849; Phymastrea valenciennesii Milne Edwards & Haime, 1849; Favia bertholleti Milne Edwards & Haime, 1857; Favia valenciennesi (Milne Edwards & Haime, 1849); Manicina valenciennesi (Milne Edwards & Haime, 1849); Montastraea valenciennesi (Milne Edwards & Haime, 1849); Montastrea valenciennesi (Milne Edwards & Haime, 1849); Phymastraea irregularis Duncan, 1883; Phymastrea aspera Quelch, 1886; Phymastraea aspera Quelch, 1886; Favia eridani Umbgrove, 1940; Parastrea bertholleti Valenciennes, ms

Species of coral

Favites valenciennesi is a species of stony coral in the family Merulinidae. It is native to the Indo-Pacific region and its range extends from Madagascar through the Indian Ocean to the Western and Central Pacific Ocean. This is a generally uncommon species but has a wide range and the International Union for Conservation of Nature has rated its conservation status as being a "near-threatened species".

== Distribution and habitat ==
Favites valenciennesi has a wide distribution in the Indian and Pacific Oceans. It occurs at depths down to about 30 m (100 ft). It is a reef-building coral and occupies a range of habitats including rocky reefs, fore and hind reef slopes, and lagoons and is most common at moderate depths. In shallow water it tends to be massive and globular, or lobed, while in deeper water it tends to form plate-like layers.

== Status ==
Favites valenciennesi has a very wide range but is generally an uncommon species over much of that range. There is no precise information on population trends, but it is likely to be decreasing. This coral faces the same threats as other species; habitat destruction, global warming and ocean acidification. It is also collected for use in reef aquaria, and the International Union for Conservation of Nature has assessed its conservation status as being "near threatened".
