= Anacropora puertogalerae =

Conservation status
- Endangered (IUCN 3.1)

Scientific classification
- Kingdom: Animalia
- Phylum: Cnidaria
- Subphylum: Anthozoa
- Class: Hexacorallia
- Order: Scleractinia
- Family: Acroporidae
- Genus: Anacropora
- Species: A. puertogalerae

Binomial name
- Anacropora puertogalerae Nemenzo, 1964

Species of coral

Anacropora puertogalerae is a species of briar coral that can be found in the central Indo-Pacific, Japan, the East China Sea, eastern Australia, the oceanic west Pacific Ocean, the Philippines and the Maldives. It is also found in the Andaman Islands, Rodrigues, Fiji and Vanuatu. It occurs in shallow reefs, from depths of 5–20 m. It is very fragile, and is particularly susceptible to coral bleaching, disease and habitat loss.
