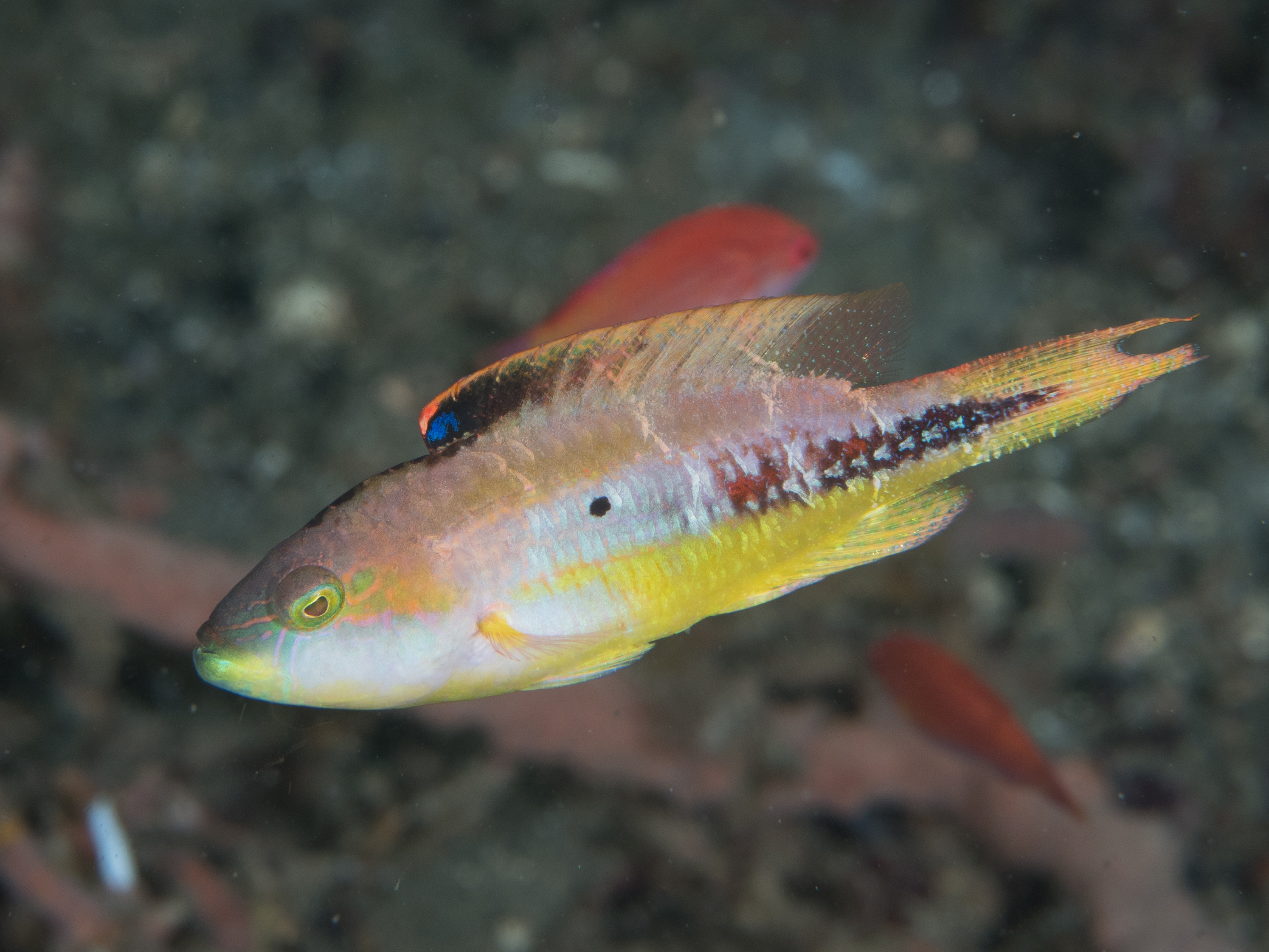
- At Lembeh, Indonesia

Conservation status
- Least Concern (IUCN 3.1)

Scientific classification
- Kingdom: Animalia
- Phylum: Chordata
- Class: Actinopterygii
- Order: Labriformes
- Family: Labridae
- Genus: Oxycheilinus
- Species: O. bimaculatus

Binomial name
- Oxycheilinus bimaculatus Valenciennes, 1840

Synonyms
- Cheilinus bimaculatus Valenciennes, 1840; Cheillio bimaculatus (Valenciennes, 1840)

= Oxycheilinus bimaculatus =

Species of marine fish

Oxycheilinus bimaculatus, the two-spot wrasse, is a species of wrasse native to the Indo-Pacific.

== Common names ==
The species is known under a variety of common English names including two-spot wrasse, comettailed wrasse, doublespot wrasse, and little Maori wrasse.

== Description ==
The two-spot wrasse reaches lengths of about 14 cm (5.5 in). Its body colouration varies from brown to yellow or green in spots or streaks. There is a small dark spot located behind each eye.

== Distribution and habitat ==
The two-spot wrasse inhabits tropical and sub-tropical coastal waters in the Indo-Pacific from East Africa to Hawaiʻi, southern Japan, and Vanuatu, at depths of 2–110 m (7–361 ft). The species has a benthic or bentho-pelagic habitat and frequents the outer slopes of reefs as well as lagoons and seagrass beds. It appears to be common in Hawaiʻian and Japanese waters, but more rare off Africa and in French Polynesia.

== Gallery ==
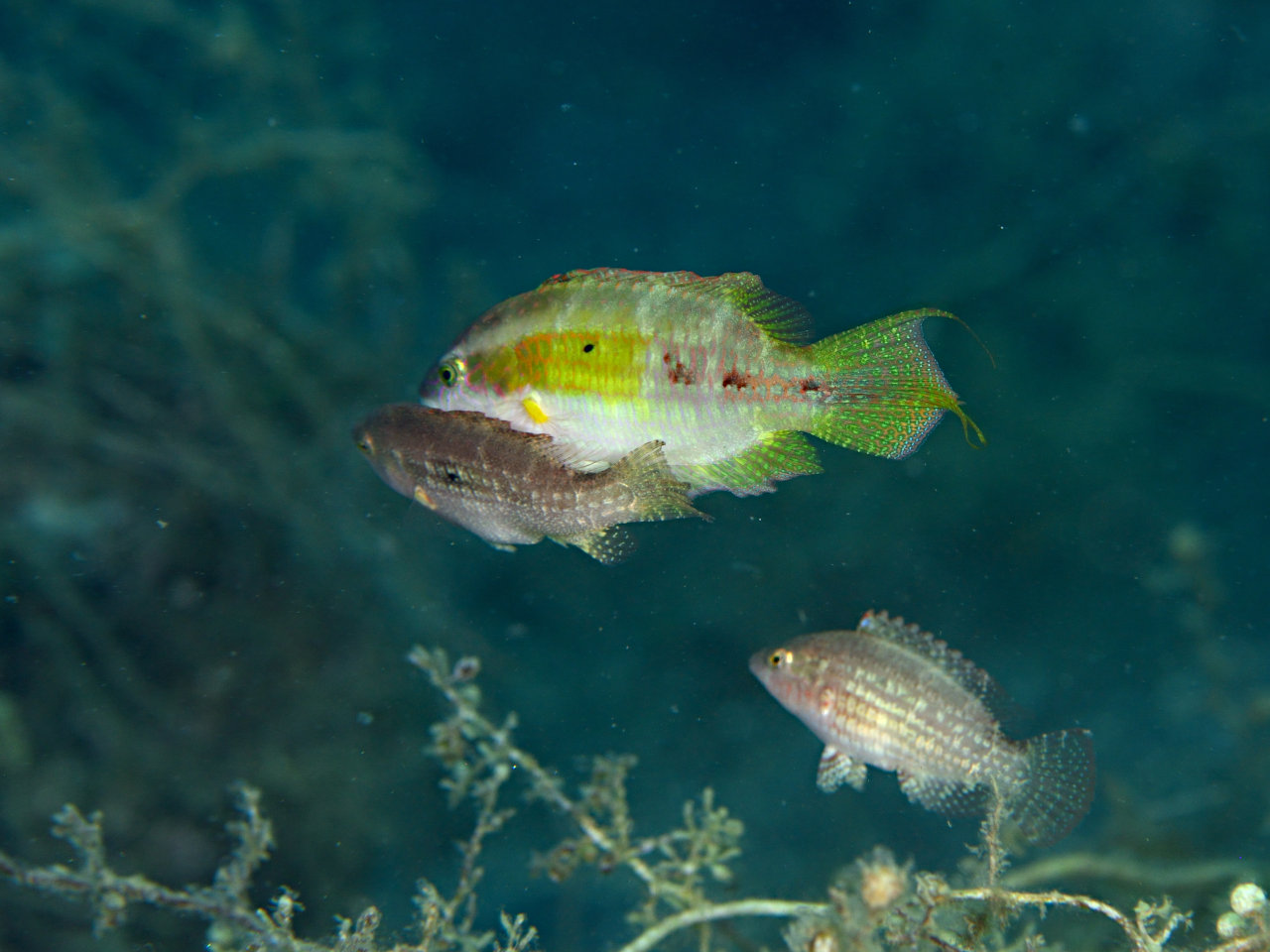
Courtship

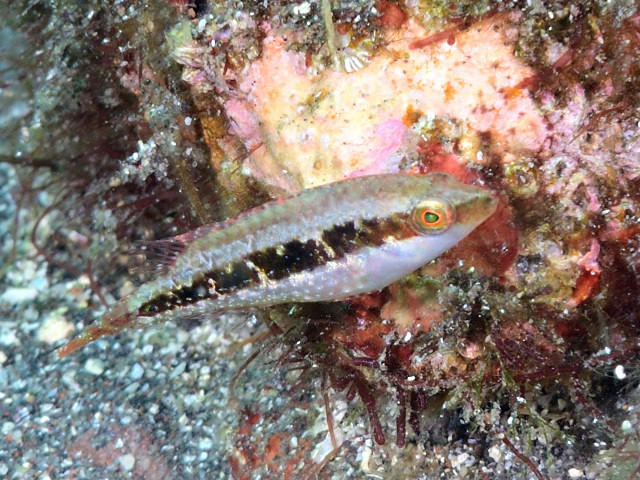
Juvenile

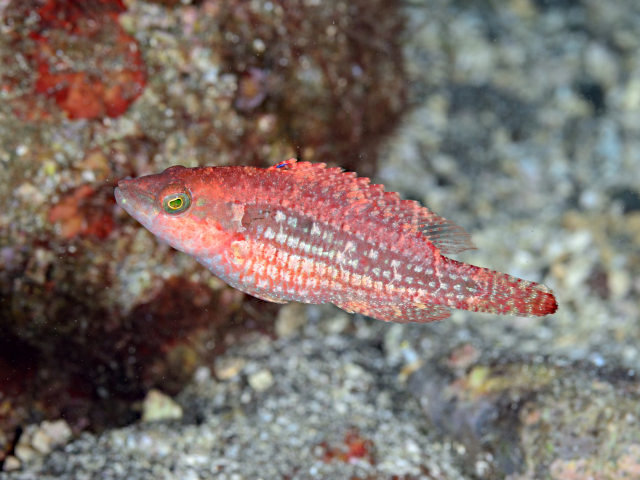

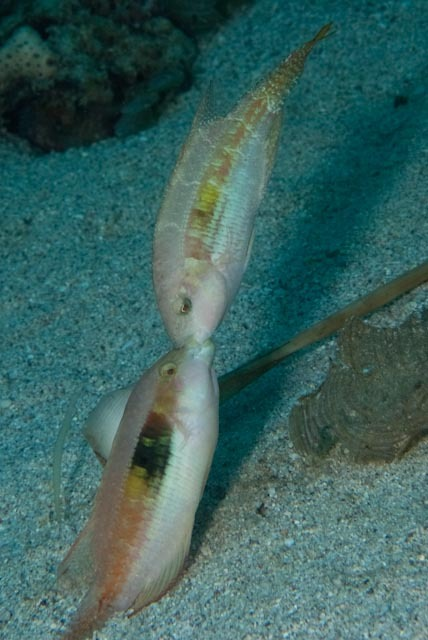
Males fighting

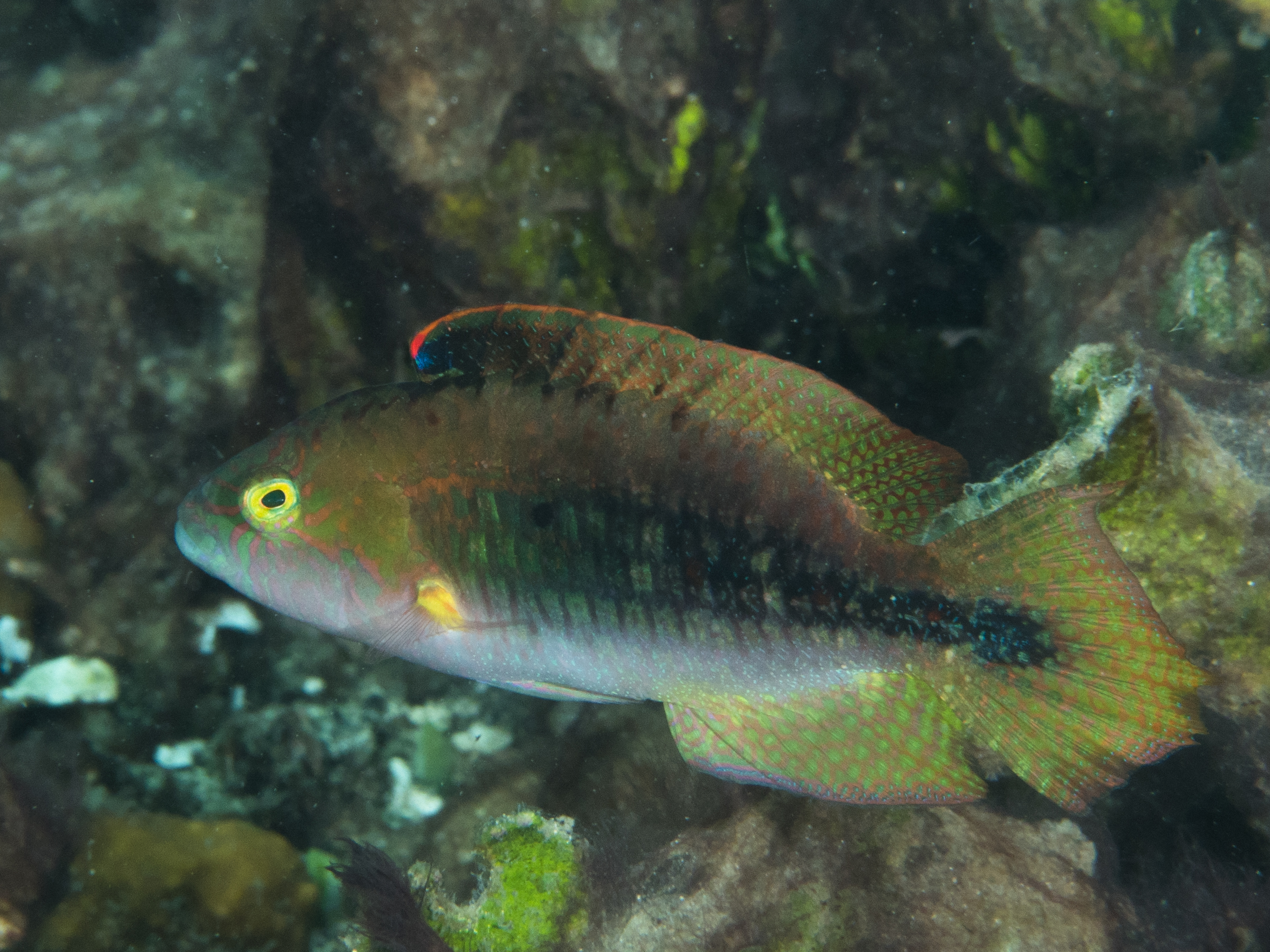
Male

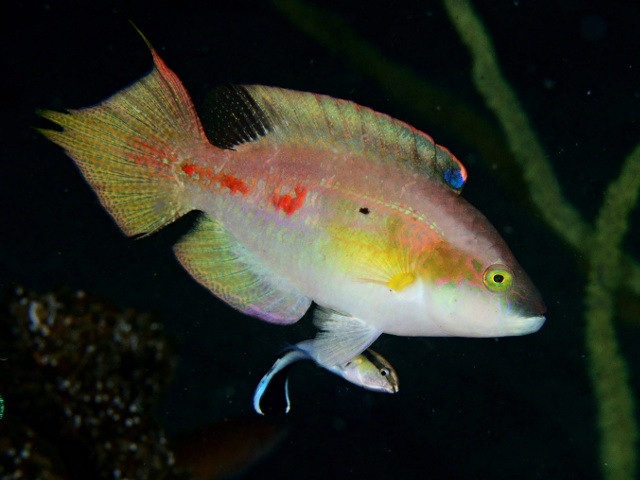
Male with bluestreak cleaner wrasse

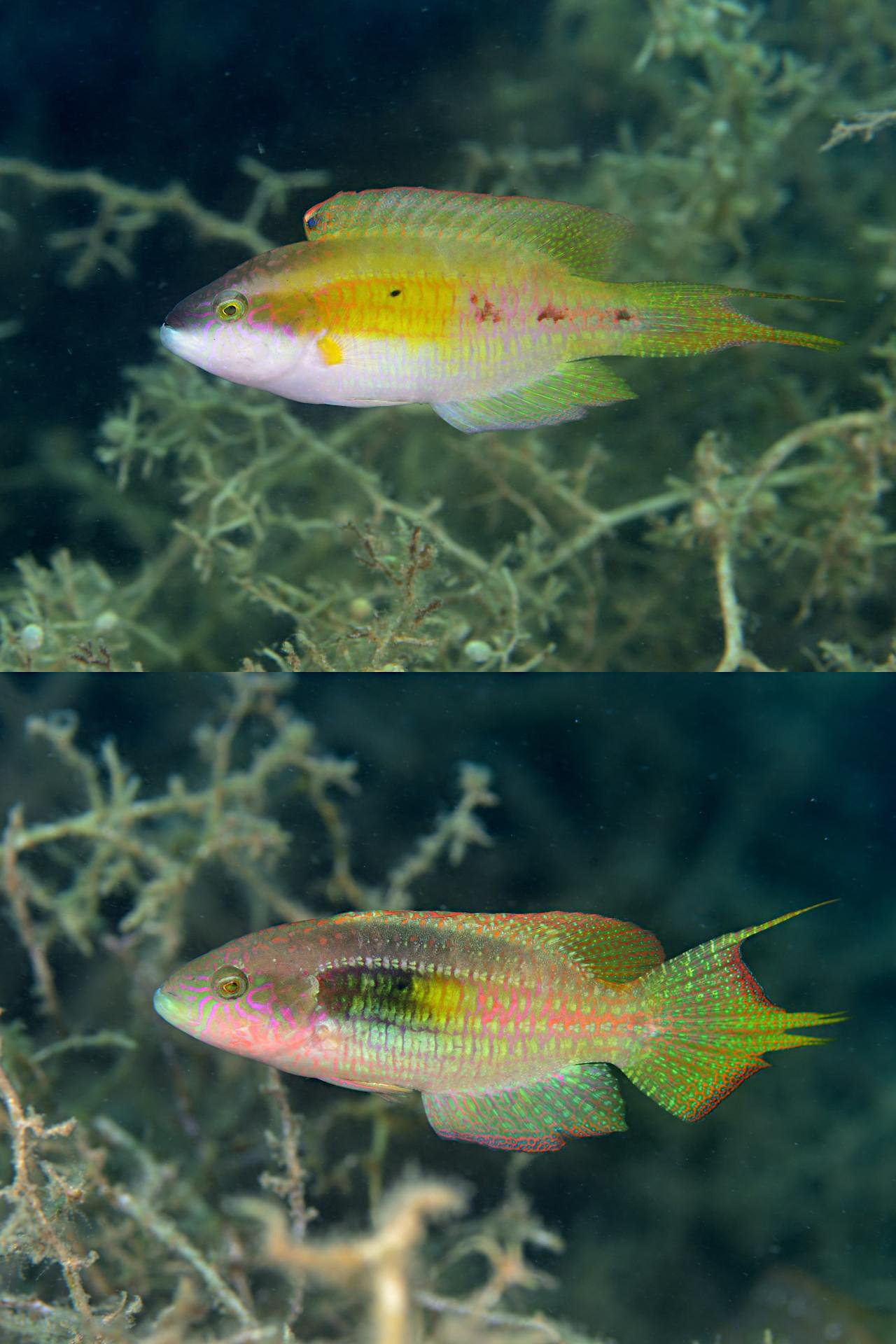
Male changing colours

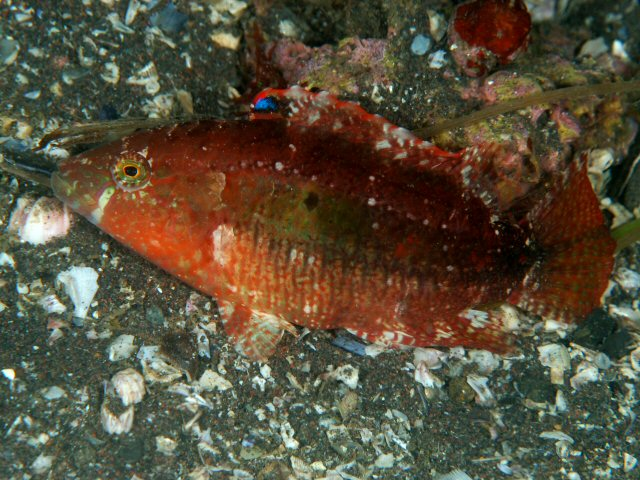
Sleeping
