= Cycloseris curvata =

Conservation status
- Least Concern (IUCN 3.1)

Scientific classification
- Kingdom: Animalia
- Phylum: Cnidaria
- Subphylum: Anthozoa
- Class: Hexacorallia
- Order: Scleractinia
- Family: Fungiidae
- Genus: Cycloseris
- Species: C. curvata

Binomial name
- Cycloseris curvata (Hoeksema, 1989)

Synonyms
- Cycloseris elegans (Verrill, 1870); Fungia curvata Hoeksema, 1989; Fungia elegans Verrill, 1870

Species of coral

Cycloseris curvata is a species of disc coral in the family Fungiidae. Cyclosteris curvata is a mostly solitary free living scleractinian disc coral found in the Indo-Pacific region. They grow on soft substrates and are known to tolerate turbid waters. Like other anthozoan corals they lack a medusa stage characteristic of other cnidarians. They have been observed as both green and brown in color in the field.

== Description ==
Cylosersis curvata polyp structure is composed of strong arches which can be up to 90 millimeters in diameter. Characteristic of other Anthozoans, they have a large gastrovascular cavity which is divided into walls known as septa, which serve to increase interior surface area. In C. curvata they are generally thick and protrude outward. When viewed from above the septa appear to curve asymmetrically. C. curvata like other cnidarians have nematocysts which are stinging tentacles that contain either a barbed or venomous coiled thread. This can be used in both self defense or to capture prey.

=== Body plan ===
Like other Cnidarians, they exhibit an oral-aboral body plan which is characterized by one side containing their mouth and the other without it. Additionally they exhibit radial symmetry meaning their body is symmetrical around a central axis.

== Distribution ==
Cycloseris curvata have been found in depths ranging from 0-30 meters^{[1]}. They are widely distributed through tropical environments ranging from 32°N-31°S. And 32°E-77°W^{[1]}.

== Life cycle ==
At the basis of their life cycle, their zygotes become planular planktonic larvae. They continue through a series of metamorphosis forming tentacles, septa, and a pharynx until they ultimately settle as a polyp^{[2]}. Cycloseris curvata have been found to inhabit soft benthic substrates in both inter-reef and reef environments. They can tolerate temperatures ranging from 22°C-27°C

== Reproduction ==
Anthozoans are either gonochoristic or hermaphrodites. Germ cells originate in the endoderm and are eventually moved to the gastrodermis where they will differentiate. Once the germ cells have matured they are released through the coelenteron into the sea, as a result reproduction is external. In this process many gametes are produced to increase likelihood of fertilization.^{[3]} They can also reproduce asexually through budding or fragmentation.^{[2]}

== Behavior ==
Individuals feed by extending their tentacles and trapping small zooplankton through a process known as suspension feeding.^{[4]} Larger cnidarians can catch fish and crabs with their nematocysts.^{[4]} Not much is known about their interactions with other species, however they seem to form symbiotic relationships with photosynthetic symbionts.^{[4]}
