= Horastrea =

Horastrea indica

Conservation status
- Least Concern (IUCN 3.1)

Scientific classification
- Kingdom: Animalia
- Phylum: Cnidaria
- Subphylum: Anthozoa
- Class: Hexacorallia
- Order: Scleractinia
- Family: Coscinaraeidae
- Genus: Horastrea; Pichon, 1971
- Species: H. indica

Binomial name
- Horastrea indica Pichon, 1971

Genus of corals

Horastrea is a monotypic genus of stony coral in the family Coscinaraeidae. It is represented by the single species Horastrea indica, the blister coral. It is native to the southwestern Indian Ocean where it is found in shallow water sandy reefs. It was first described by M Pichon in 1971.

== Description ==
H. indica forms massive solid colonies, usually hemispherical in shape. The individual corallites, the stony cups in which the polyps sit, are plocoid (surrounded by a wall) in smaller colonies, becoming meandroid (several corallites inside a valley) in larger ones. There are three cycles of septa (stony ridges) inside the calyx and these continue as well-developed costae between the corallites. This is a zooxanthellate species containing microscopic symbiotic algae in the tissues which supplement the nutritional needs of the colony. This gives it a generally pale brown appearance, with contrasting oral discs of bluish-grey.

== Distribution and habitat ==
H. indica is found in the southwestern Indian Ocean, its range extending from Somalia, Kenya, Tanzania and Mozambique to Madagascar, the Comoros, Mayotte, Mauritius, Réunion and the Seychelles. It inhabits sandy reefs at depths of less than 20 m (66 ft).

== Status ==
H. indica is an uncommon species of coral that was first described in 1971. Like other corals in the southwestern Indian Ocean, it faces threats from global warming, rising sea temperatures and the increasing occurrence of severe weather conditions. Bleaching events occur with rising sea temperatures and the corals become more prone to coral diseases. Ocean acidification affects corals as does increased siltation from human developments and mechanical damage to reefs from fishing activities. Previously assessed as a vulnerable species due to its restricted range and rarity, the International Union for Conservation of Nature reassessed its conservation status as least concern in 2024 based on updated population modelling.
