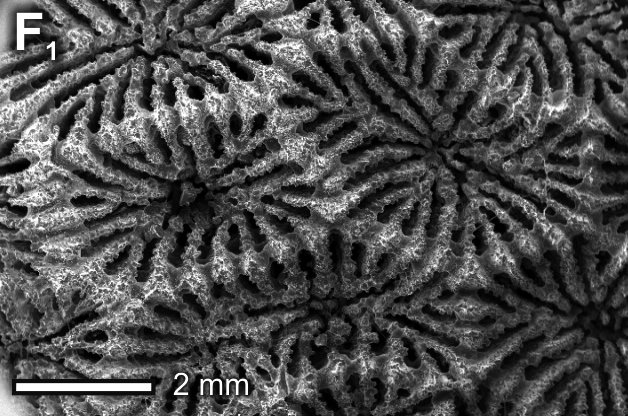
- Close up of corallites

Conservation status
- Least Concern (IUCN 3.1)

Scientific classification
- Kingdom: Animalia
- Phylum: Cnidaria
- Subphylum: Anthozoa
- Class: Hexacorallia
- Order: Scleractinia
- Family: Coscinaraeidae
- Genus: Anomastraea; Marenzeller, 1901
- Species: A. irregularis

Binomial name
- Anomastraea irregularis Marenzeller, 1901

= Anomastraea =

Crisp pillow coral

Genus of corals

Anomastraea is a monotypic genus of corals in the family Coscinaraeidae. It is represented by a single species, the crisp pillow coral (Anomastraea irregularis).

== Description ==
The crisp pillow coral forms small, mound-like colonies that grow to be about 20 cm in height and make a blue-grey and cream color. Like other corals that form colonies, it consists of soft, little polyps that are assisted with small tentacles that guide food in the water to the coral's mouth. The polyps discharge a skeleton made of calcium carbonate known as corallite which would participate in the formation of coral reefs. The corallites establish an uneven honey-comb pattern.

As a member of the family Siderastreidae, it is a zooxanthellate, living in harmony with zooxanthellae, a unicellular algae, which aids the coral in its growth and survival. The coral protects the algae with its tissue as the algae helps the host with energy and nutrients, as well as removing metabolic waste. However, the crisp pillow coral is restricted to staying in shallow waters where the zooxanthellae can execute photosynthesis.

== Distribution ==
The crisp pillow coral is found on the East African coast, the southern area of the Red Sea, the Gulf of Aden, north and southwestern Indian Ocean, and the Persian Gulf. However, it is not found in the Chagos Archipelago. It is also known in small areas around Madagascar and islands near it.

It is populated in shallow and sandy, tropical coral reef systems. At the base of the reefs and intertidal pools, it lives in turbid water, usually to about 20 m in depth.

== Diet ==
Although the zooxanthellae provide about 70% of the coral's nutrients through photosynthesis, the coral may also prey upon zooplankton, dissolved organic matter, and planktonic bacteria.

== Threats ==
The crisp pillow coral is threatened to extinction with a decreasing population. The principal threat is the rising sea temperature due to global warming and the increasing climate. This expels the zooxanthellae from the coral, leaving it weak and prone to many diseases without the aid of the algae. The climate change also is expected to increase ocean acidification and destructive weather, such as storms that destroy the coral reefs.

The crown-of-thorns starfish is a voracious predator of coral reefs. Since the 1970s, an increasing population of the crown-of-thorns starfish has broken out, consuming more corals in the reefs. Human activity has caused the outbreak of the crown-of-thorn starfish. The overfishing of unprotected reefs may deplete much of the population of the predators of the crown-of-thorn starfish, such as the humphead wrasse. The triton snail, another natural predator, is being collected for its valuable shell. Nutrients from agriculture wash off to the oceans, causing phytoplanktons population increases, which gives more food for the starfish larvae.

Other causes of the declining population of the crisp pillow coral are pollution, destructive fishing practices, human activity, and invasive species.

== Conservation ==
The crisp pillow coral is listed on the Appendix II of CITES, protecting the species from being traded without a permit. Current research is being conducted to ensure the safety of the crisp pillow coral.
