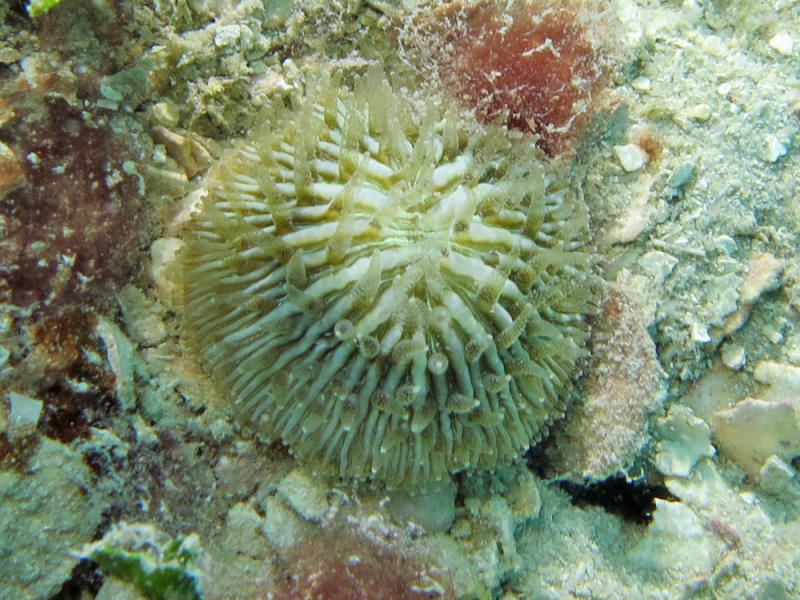
- A specimen about 30 cm in diameter off Lizard Island, Australia, at 22 m depth

Conservation status
- Least Concern (IUCN 3.1)

Scientific classification
- Kingdom: Animalia
- Phylum: Cnidaria
- Subphylum: Anthozoa
- Class: Hexacorallia
- Order: Scleractinia
- Family: Fungiidae
- Genus: Cycloseris
- Species: C. cyclolites

Binomial name
- Cycloseris cyclolites (Lamarck, 1815)

Synonyms
- Diaseris mortoni Tenison-Woods, 1880; Fungia adrianae Van Der Horst, 1921; Fungia cyclolites Lamarck, 1815; Fungia glans Dana, 1846

= Cycloseris cyclolites =

Species of disc coral in the family Fungiidae

Cycloseris cyclolites is a species of disc coral in the family Fungiidae. It was first described by the French naturalist Jean-Baptiste Lamarck in 1815. It is native to the tropical and subtropical Indo-Pacific region where it is found on soft sediment in shallow water.

== Description ==
A solitary disc coral, C. cyclolites is round or slightly oval, forming a dome up to 4 cm (1.6 in) wide with a hollowed out under surface. The primary septa are thick and straight with up to four more whorls of septa in larger specimens. The colour varies, usually being whitish or greenish, but shallow water specimens are sometimes brightly coloured. The primary septa often have white margins.

== Distribution and habitat ==
Cycloseris cyclolites is found in oceans of the tropical and subtropical Indo-Pacific region. Its range extends from Madagascar, the East African coast and the Red Sea through India and Malaysia to northern Australia, Japan and various island groups in the Pacific Ocean. Its typical habitat is on soft substrate, often muddy sand, between reefs, but it also sometimes occurs on the reefs themselves. C. cyclolites is part of a species complex and it is probable that reports of this species in the Western Indian Ocean should be assigned to a different species.

== Ecology ==
This is a zooxanthellate species of coral, meaning that the soft tissues contain symbiotic unicellular dinoflagellates which provide nutrients to their host. The coral is highly adapted to life on sand or mud in calm waters and is capable of shedding any sediment that threatens to blanket it. Being unattached, it is able to move about freely. Movement is made by a combination of distension of the polyp by inflating the tissues with water, and moving the tentacles about. The polyp can enlarge by 300 or 400% and this reduces the density of the whole animal, allowing it to "float" to the surface of the sediment in which it has become buried.
