= Jean-Louis Hardouin Michelin de Choisy =

French paleontologist and biologist

Jean-Louis Hardouin Michelin de Choisy (25 May 1786 – 9 July 1867, in Versailles) was a French malacologist and palaeontologist.

Michelin de Choisy was an 'Inspecteur des Finances'. He wrote Description des polypiers fossiles du Bassin Parisien. (Groupe Supracrétacé.) Avec figures lithographiées par Ludovic Michelin in Iconographie zoophytologique and many papers in Magasin de conchyliologie.
