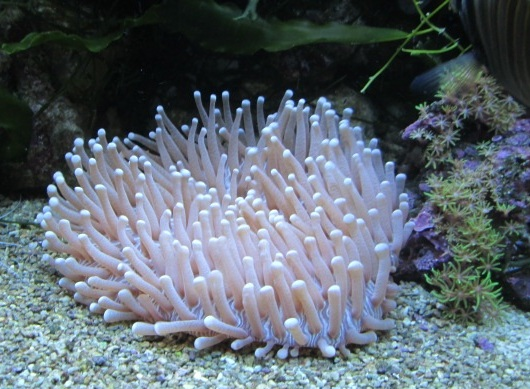
- Heliofungia actiniformis

Scientific classification
- Kingdom: Animalia
- Phylum: Cnidaria
- Subphylum: Anthozoa
- Class: Hexacorallia
- Order: Scleractinia
- Family: Fungiidae
- Genus: Heliofungia; Wells, 1966

Species
- See text

Synonyms
- Fungia (Heliofungia) Wells, 1966

= Heliofungia =

Genus of corals

Heliofungia is a genus of stony corals in the family Fungiidae. These corals are found in shallow water in the Indo-Pacific region. They are zooxanthellate corals and were formerly considered to be a subgenus of the genus Fungia.

== Species ==
The World Register of Marine Species currently lists the following two species:

- Heliofungia actiniformis Quoy & Gaimard, 1833
- Heliofungia fralinae (Nemenzo, 1955)
