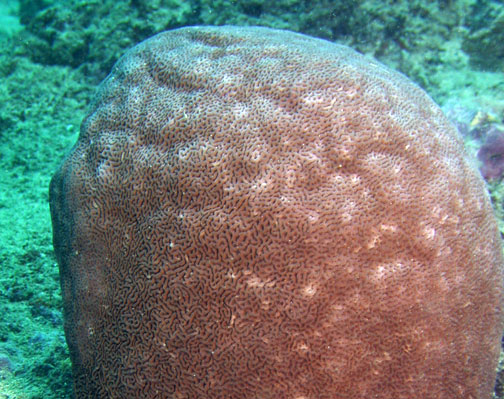
- Coscinaraea columna

Scientific classification
- Kingdom: Animalia
- Phylum: Cnidaria
- Subphylum: Anthozoa
- Class: Hexacorallia
- Order: Scleractinia
- Family: Coscinaraeidae; Benzoni, F., Arrigoni, R., Stefani, F. & Stolarski, J., 2012

= Coscinaraeidae =

Family of corals

The Coscinaraeidae are a family of stony corals found in the Indo-Pacific region.

== Genera ==
The World Register of Marine Species lists the following genera:

- Anomastraea Marenzeller, 1901
- Coscinaraea Milne Edwards & Haime, 1848
- Craterastrea Head, 1983
- Horastrea Pichon, 1971
