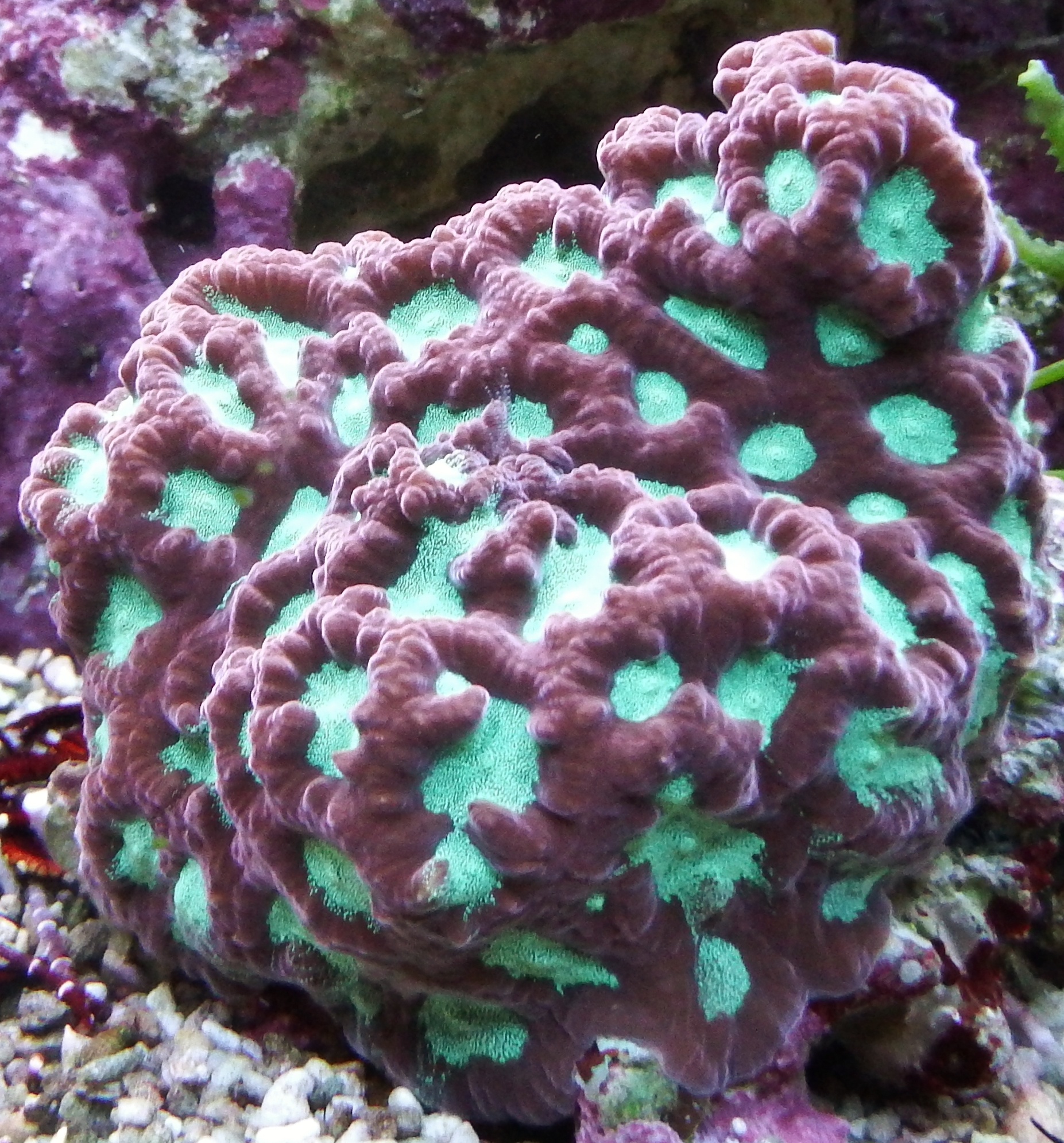
- Favites pentagona

Scientific classification
- Kingdom: Animalia
- Phylum: Cnidaria
- Subphylum: Anthozoa
- Class: Hexacorallia
- Order: Scleractinia
- Family: Merulinidae
- Genus: Favites; Link, 1807

Species
- See text

Synonyms
- List: Aphrastrea Milne Edwards & Haime, 1848; Favastrea de Blainville, 1834; Phymastraea Milne Edwards & Haime, 1848 [lapsus]; Phymastrea Milne Edwards & Haime, 1848; Prionastraea Milne Edwards & Haime, 1848

= Favites =

Favites Temporal range: Jurassic - Recent

Genus of corals

Favites is a genus of stony corals in the family Merulinidae. Members of this genus are native to the Indo-Pacific region and their ranges extend from the Red Sea through the Indian Ocean and Western Pacific Ocean as far as Japan, the Line Islands and the Tuamotu Islands.

== Characteristics ==
Colonies can be encrusting but are usually massive and dome-shaped. The corallites are mostly cerioid (sharing a common wall), but some are plocoid (with an individual wall) and the palliform lobes are indistinct, which distinguishes these corals from the otherwise similar Goniastrea.

== Species ==
The following species are currently recognized by the World Register of Marine Species :

- Favites abdita (Ellis & Solander, 1786)
- Favites acuticollis (Ortmann, 1889)
- Favites chinensis (Verrill, 1866)
- Favites colemani (Veron, 2000)
- Favites complanata (Ehrenberg, 1834)
- Favites favosa (Ellis & Solander, 1786)
- Favites flexuosa (Dana, 1846)
- Favites halicora (Ehrenberg, 1834)
- Favites magnistellata (Chevalier, 1971)
- Favites melicerum (Ehrenberg, 1834)
- Favites micropentagonus Veron, 2000
- Favites monticularis Mondal, Raghunathan & Venkataraman, 2013
- Favites paraflexuosus Veron, 2000
- Favites pentagona (Esper, 1795)
- Favites rotundata Veron, Pichon & Wijsman-Best, 1977
- Favites solidocolumellae Latypov, 2006
- Favites spinosa (Klunzinger, 1879)
- Favites stylifera Yabe & Sugiyama, 1937
- Favites valenciennesi (Milne Edwards & Haime, 1849)
- Favites vasta (Klunzinger, 1879)

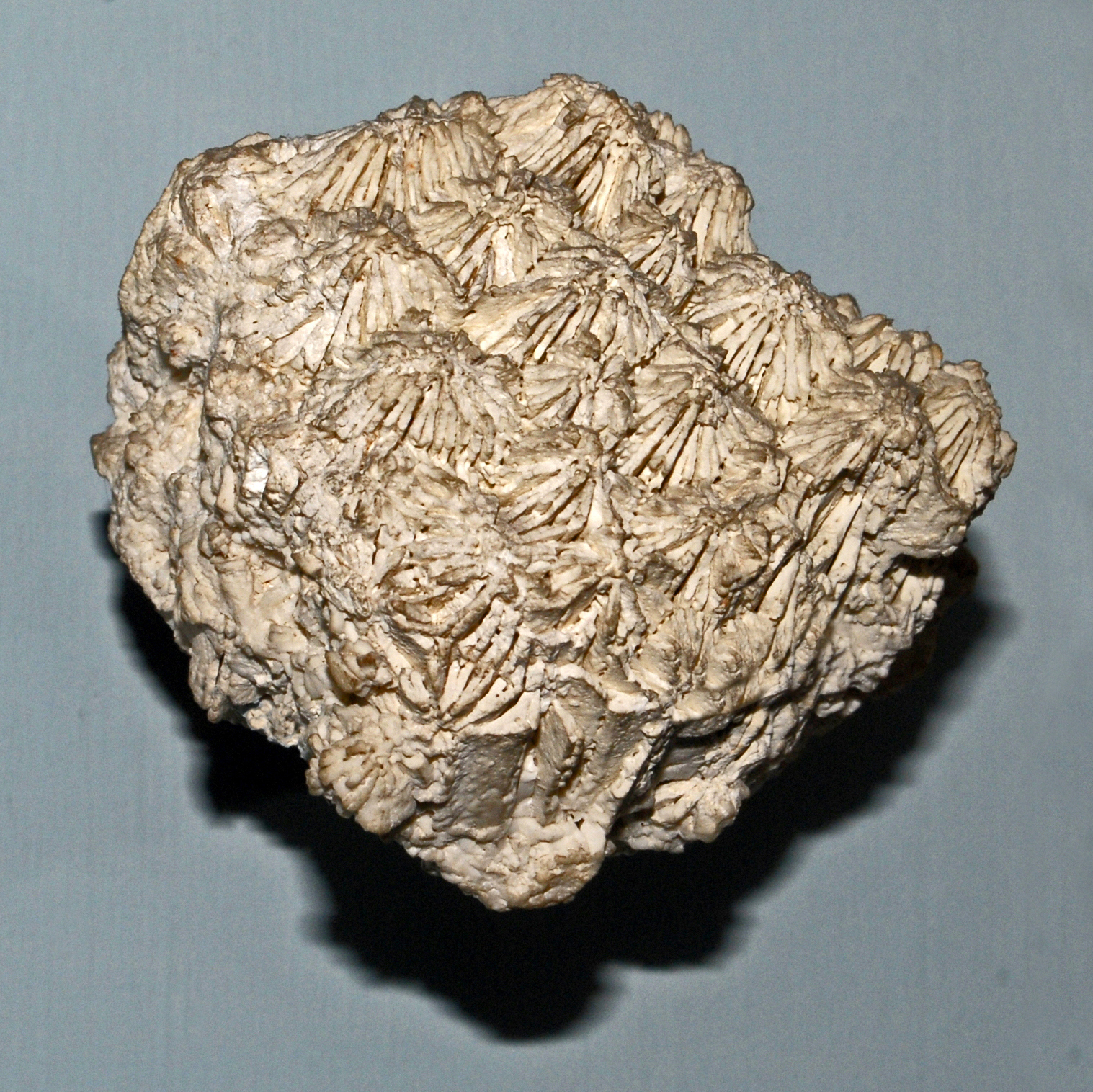
Fossil internal model of Favites, from Miocene of Italy

== Fossil record ==
Fossils of Favites are found in marine strata from the Jurassic to the Quaternary (age range: from 161.2 to 0.0 million years ago.). Fossils are known from many localities in Europe, Indonesia, Philippines, Africa, North America, South America, Pakistan, Japan and India.
