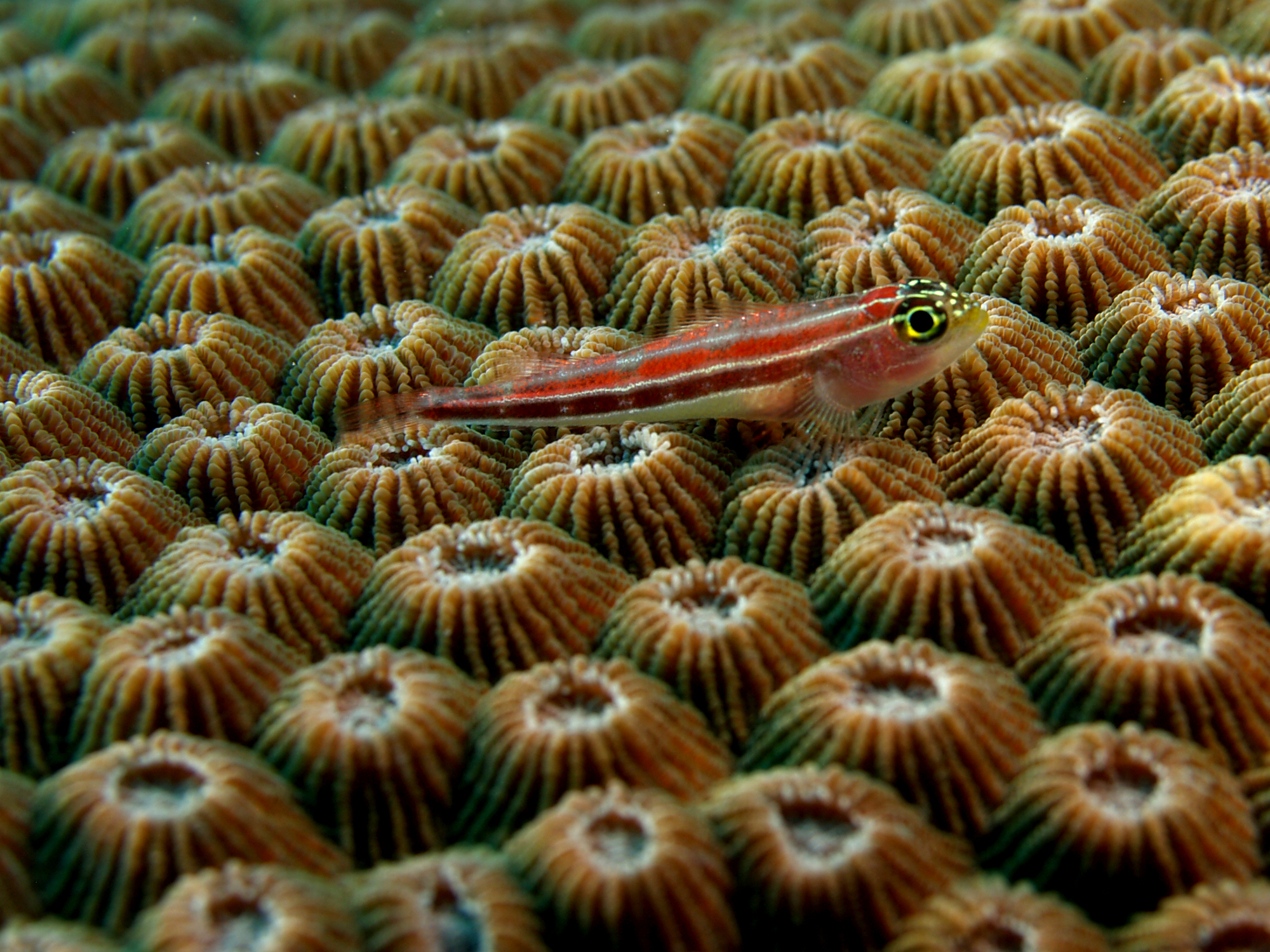

Conservation status
- Least Concern (IUCN 3.1)

Scientific classification
- Kingdom: Animalia
- Phylum: Cnidaria
- Subphylum: Anthozoa
- Class: Hexacorallia
- Order: Scleractinia
- Family: Diploastreidae
- Genus: Diploastrea
- Species: D. heliopora

Binomial name
- Diploastrea heliopora Lamarck, 1816

Synonyms
- List: Astraea heliopora Lamarck, 1816; Astrea heliopora Lamarck, 1816; Orbicella heliopora (Lamarck, 1816); Orbicella minikoensis Gardiner, 1904 [lapsus]; Orbicella minikoiensis Gardiner, 1904

= Diploastrea heliopora =

Species of coral

Diploastrea heliopora, commonly known as diploastrea brain coral or honeycomb coral among other vernacular names, is a species of hard coral in the family Diploastreidae. It is the only extant species in its genus. This species can form massive dome-shaped colonies of great size.

== Taxonomy ==
Diploastrea heliopora was first described in 1816 by the French naturalist Jean-Baptiste Lamarck as Astrea heliopora. It was transferred to the new genus Diploastrea by G. Matthai in 1914. Diploastrea heliopora was included in the family Agathiphylliidae by T.W. Vaughan and J.W. Wells in 1943. It was the only extant member of the family, which also included four fossil species. In 1956, Wells transferred the genus to Faviidae, and this has been widely accepted. However, recent molecular and phylogenetic studies show that this coral has certain unique features, and a separate family, Diploastreidae, has been reinstated. It is the only extant member of the family.

== Description ==
A colonial species, D. heliopora grows into domes 1 metre (3 ft 3 in) or more across. The corallites are plocoid (with an individual wall), round and closely packed, about 1 cm (0.4 in) in diameter and formed by extratentacular budding. The corallite walls are distinctive, being not solid but formed from the enlarged outer ends of the septa, which are not connected to each other. The columellae are large. The coral has a smooth surface and is usually cream or greyish-brown, sometimes tinged with green. It is a zooxanthellate species.

== Distribution and habitat ==
This species is widespread throughout the tropical waters of the Indo-West Pacific region, including the Red Sea, occurring at depths down to 30 m (100 ft). Its typical habitat is in silty environments without strong wave action such as protected fringing reefs and back reef slopes. In the atoll lagoons of the Indian Ocean it is often plentiful and dominant, while in the Red Sea it is uncommon.

== Ecology ==
Small gobies can often be found perching on this coral or swimming around the surface searching for food. This coral is a zooxanthellate species; the coral houses symbiotic dinoflagellates within its tissues which supply it with much of the nourishment it needs. The polyps supplement this by extending their tentacles to feed, but do so only at night.

== Status ==
D. heliopora is plentiful in some areas but less common elsewhere. In Indonesia, it is collected for the aquarium trade, but apart from this, the threats it faces are those affecting coral reefs in general; climate change, ocean acidification, coral disease and human actions. The International Union for Conservation of Nature has assessed its conservation status as being "near threatened".
