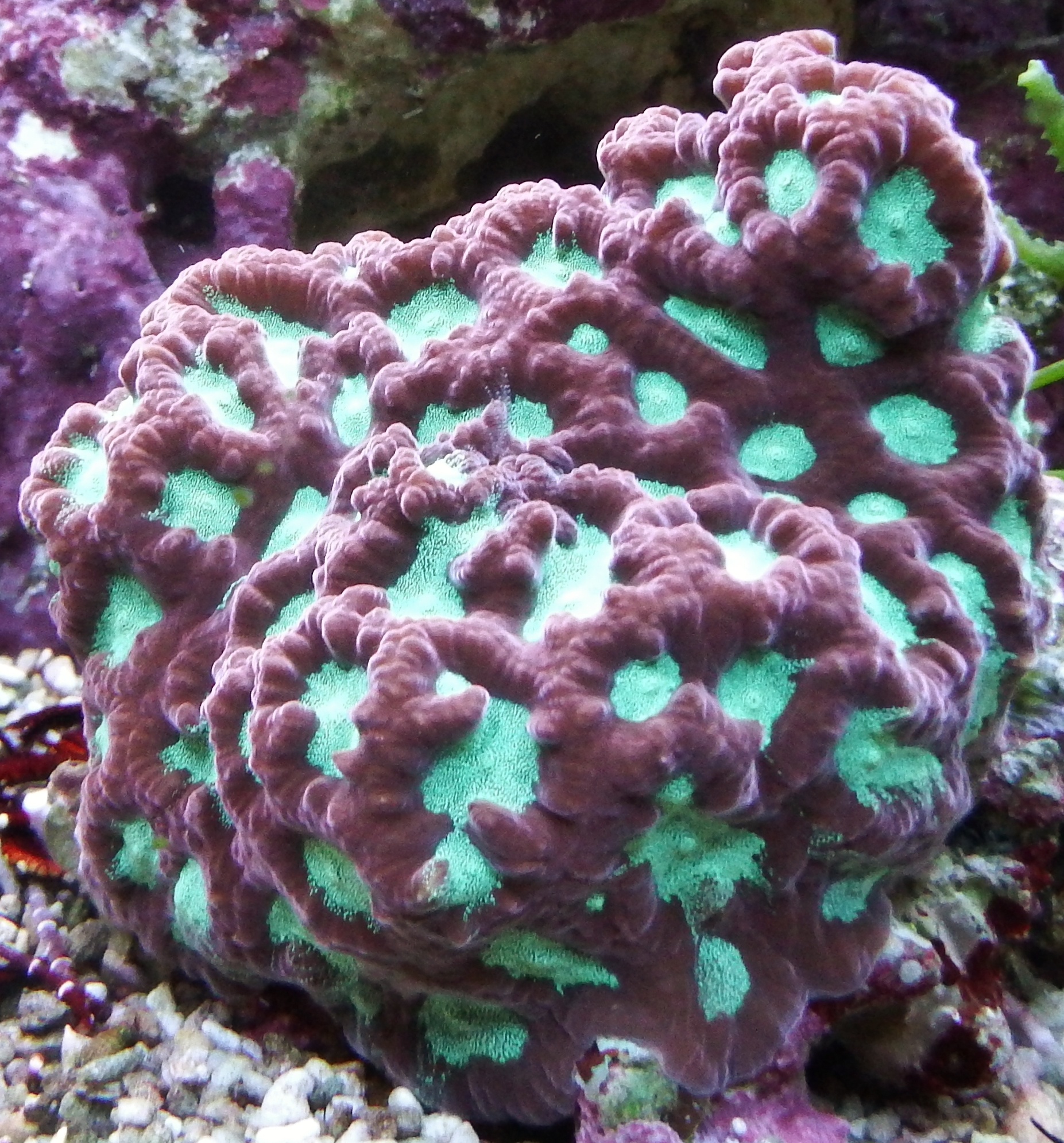

Conservation status
- Least Concern (IUCN 3.1)

Scientific classification
- Kingdom: Animalia
- Phylum: Cnidaria
- Subphylum: Anthozoa
- Class: Hexacorallia
- Order: Scleractinia
- Family: Merulinidae
- Genus: Favites
- Species: F. pentagona

Binomial name
- Favites pentagona (Esper, 1795)

Synonyms
- List: Aphrastrea deformis (Lamarck, 1816); Astraea deformis Lamarck, 1816; Astrea deformis Lamarck, 1816; Favia adduensis Gardiner, 1904; Favites gailei Chevalier, 1971; Favites parvicella Nemenzo, 1959; Goniastrea rudis Milne Edwards & Haime, 1849; Madrepora pentagona Esper, 1795; Plesiastrea haeckeli Brüggemann, 1878; Prionastraea gibbosissima Milne Edwards & Haime, 1849; Stephanocoenia maldivensis Gardiner, 1904

= Favites pentagona =

Species of stony coral in the family Merulinidae

Favites pentagona is a species of stony coral in the family Merulinidae, sometimes known as larger star coral. It is native to the Indo-Pacific region and its range extends from the Red Sea through the Indian Ocean to the Western Pacific Ocean. This is a common species throughout its wide range and the International Union for Conservation of Nature has rated its conservation status as being of "least concern".

== Description ==
Colonies of Favites pentagona are encrusting or massive, sometimes with lobes forming irregular columns. The colony may spread to about a metre (yard) across. The corallites are less than 6 mm (0.24 in) in diameter. The corallite walls are sharply-angled and thin, and several polyps may share a common wall. The palliform lobes are clearly visible on the oral disc and there are a small number of septa. This coral is often vividly coloured, with contrasting (often green) oral discs and brown, red or purple coenosarc, the living tissue that covers the skeleton between the polyps.

== Distribution ==
Favites pentagona is native to the Indo-Pacific region where it occurs in shallow tropical and subtropical seas. Its range extends from the Red Sea and South Africa to India, Indonesia, Japan and Australia, where it occurs both in Western Australia and the Great Barrier Reef. Its depth range is down to 25 metres (82 ft) and it is common on rocky reefs, outer reef channels, reef slopes and lagoons.

== Ecology ==
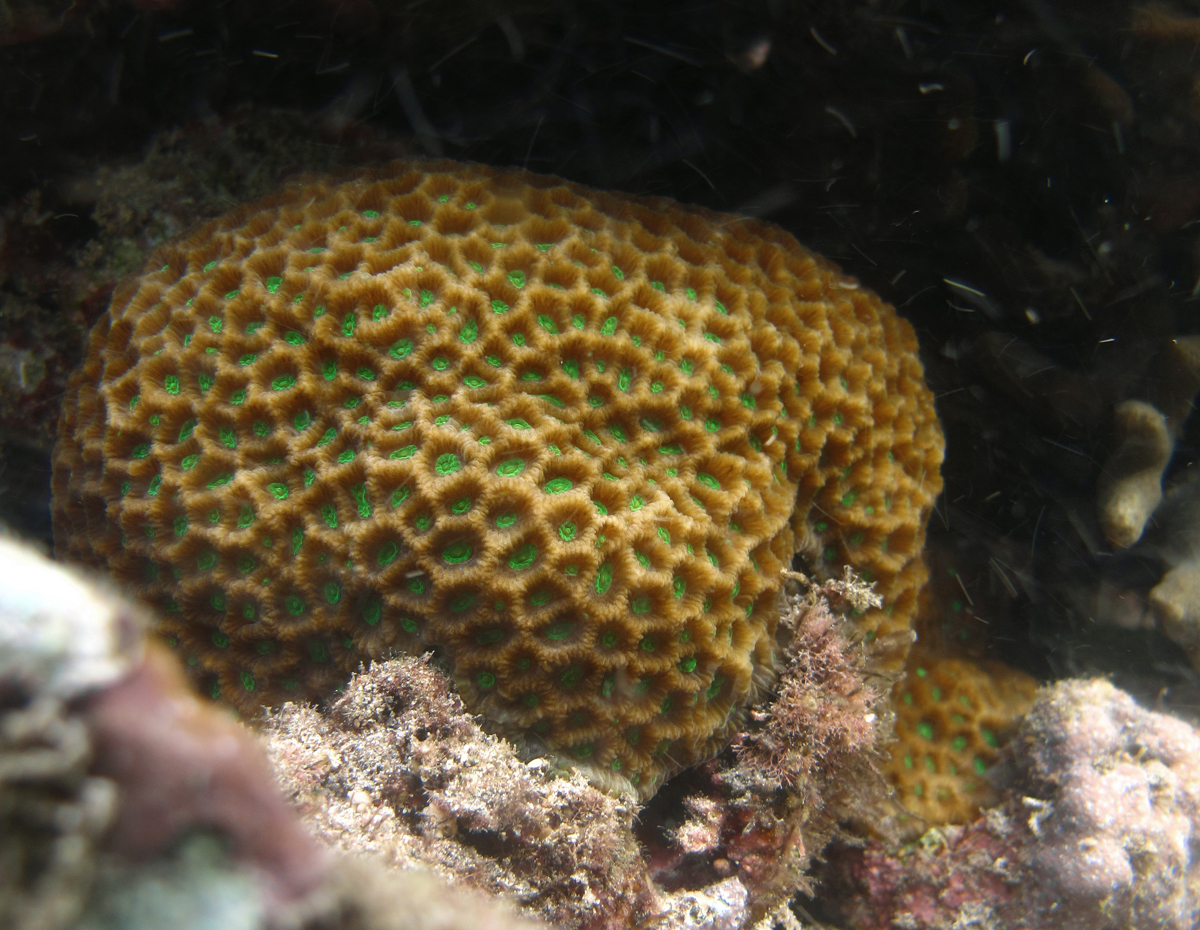
Brown coenosarc and green oral discs

Favites pentagona is a zooxanthellate species of coral. This means that it harbours symbiotic unicellular dinoflagellates in its tissues, which use the energy from sunlight to synthesize nutrients, from which the host coral benefits. It is an aggressive species of coral. At night it extends its polyps to feed on plankton, and expands its elongated sweeper tentacles armed with stinging cells well beyond the limits of its base, so as to avoid being crowded or overgrown by other organisms. It clears away sand that settles on its surface by inflating its polyps to dislodge the sediment.

F. pentagona is a simultaneous hermaphrodite, the eggs and sperm being released in well-formed bundles. In any one area, spawning tends to occur in synchrony, with all the corals liberating their gamete bundles at the same time. These rise to the sea surface and float, thus maximising the chance of successful fertilisation.

F. pentagona is susceptible to black band disease and white plague, two coral diseases which have become more common since the 1990s.

== Status ==
Favites pentagona has a very wide range and is common over much of that range. There is no precise information on population trends but this coral faces the same threats as other species; global warming, ocean acidification and degradation of its coral reef habitats. The International Union for Conservation of Nature has assessed its conservation status as being of "least concern".
