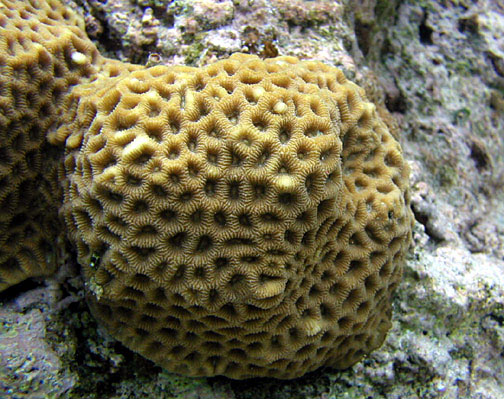

Conservation status
- Least Concern (IUCN 3.1)

Scientific classification
- Kingdom: Animalia
- Phylum: Cnidaria
- Subphylum: Anthozoa
- Class: Hexacorallia
- Order: Scleractinia
- Family: Merulinidae
- Genus: Favites
- Species: F. abdita

Binomial name
- Favites abdita (Ellis and Solander 1786)

Synonyms
- List: Astraea fusco-viridis Quoy & Gaimard, 1833; Astraea robusta Dana, 1846; Astraea virens Dana, 1846; Favastrea magnifica de Blainville, 1834; Favia abdita (Ellis & Solander, 1786); Favia hemprichii (Ehrenberg, 1834); Favites astrinus Link, 1807; Favites robusta (Dana, 1846); Favites virens (Dana, 1846); Goniastrea seychellensis (Milne Edwards & Haime, 1849); Madrepora abdita Ellis & Solander, 1786; Prionastraea abdita (Ellis & Solander, 1786); Prionastraea crassior Milne Edwards & Haime, 1849; Prionastraea gibbosa Klunzinger, 1879; Prionastraea magnifica (de Blainville, 1834); Prionastraea obtusata Milne Edwards & Haime, 1849; Prionastraea profundicella Milne Edwards & Haime, 1849; Prionastraea quoyi Milne Edwards & Haime, 1849; Prionastraea robusta (Dana, 1846); Prionastraea seychellensis Milne Edwards & Haime, 1849; Prionastraea sulfurea Milne Edwards, 1857

= Favites abdita =

Species of coral

Favites abdita, also known as the larger star coral, is a species of stony coral in the family Merulinidae. It is native to the Indo-Pacific region and its range extends from East Africa and the Red Sea through the Indian Ocean to the Western Pacific Ocean. The International Union for Conservation of Nature has rated its conservation status as being "near-threatened".

== Description ==
Favites abdita is a massive colonial coral forming rounded irregular mounds. The corallites are 10 to 14 mm (0.39 to 0.55 in) in diameter and have thick walls. The septa are straight with well-developed teeth. Various colours occur, ranging from reddish brown to greyish green, and the oral discs are usually green.

== Distribution ==
Favites abdita is native to the Indo-Pacific region where it occurs in shallow tropical and subtropical seas. Its range extends from the Red Sea and South Africa to India, Indonesia, Japan, Australia and the Central Pacific island groups. Its depth range is down to about 15 metres (49 ft) and it is common on rocks and rocky reefs, outer reef channels, reef slopes and lagoons. It is also found at greater depths on coral rubble between reefs.

== Status ==
Favites abdita is a common species and has a wide range and is likely to be more resilient than some other coral species. There is no precise information on population trends but this coral faces the same threats as other species; global warming, ocean acidification and degradation of its coral reef habitats. It is collected for the reef aquarium trade. The International Union for Conservation of Nature has assessed its conservation status as being "near-threatened".
