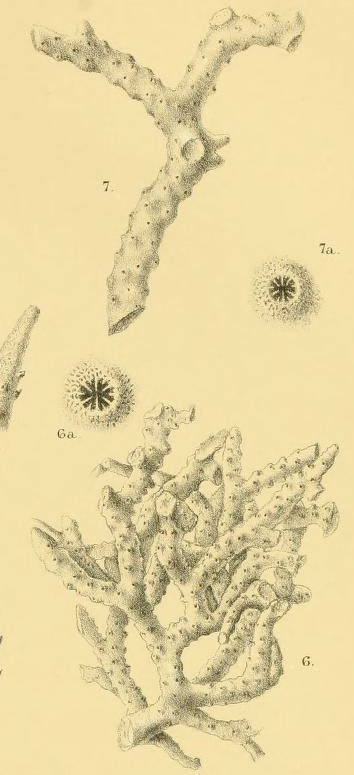
- Illustration of Anacropora gracilis and Anacropora solida

Scientific classification
- Domain: Eukaryota
- Kingdom: Animalia
- Phylum: Cnidaria
- Class: Hexacorallia
- Order: Scleractinia
- Family: Acroporidae
- Genus: Anacropora; Ridley, 1884

Species
- see text

= Anacropora =

Genus of corals

Anacropora is a genus of stony corals in the Acroporidae family. They are sometimes called briar corals and there are seven known species.

== Description ==
Members of this genus are generally fragile corals with branches less than ten centimetres long which form small colonies. The branches are either spreading or may be clustered and are sometimes fused together. The calices are rounded and up to one millimetre in diameter. The area between the calices is porous with numerous small tubercles. There are no axial corallites and the main septa number six with a few more subsidiary ones. The small radial corallites have an ‘empty’ appearance similar to Montipora. The delicate tentacles can often be seen extended during the day.

== Distribution ==
Members of this genus occur in the Indian Ocean and the western Pacific being found mostly in muddy waters. They are generally uncommon and are not a reef species.

== Species ==
- Anacropora forbesi - Ridley, 1884
- Anacropora matthai - Pillai, 1973
- Anacropora pillai - Veron, 2002
- Anacropora puertogalerae - Nemenzo, 1964
- Anacropora reticulata - Veron and Wallace, 1984
- Anacropora spinosa - Rehberg, 1892
- Anacropora spumosa - Veron, Turak & DeVantier, 2002
