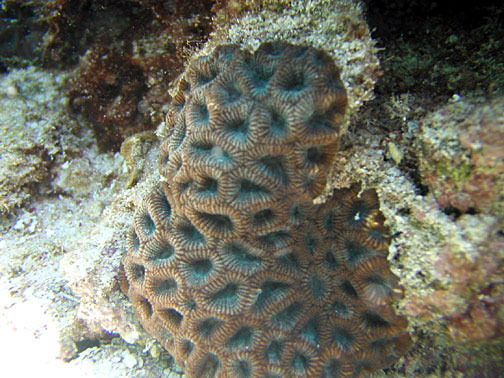

Conservation status
- Least Concern (IUCN 3.1)

Scientific classification
- Kingdom: Animalia
- Phylum: Cnidaria
- Subphylum: Anthozoa
- Class: Hexacorallia
- Order: Scleractinia
- Family: Merulinidae
- Genus: Favites
- Species: F. complanata

Binomial name
- Favites complanata (Ehrenberg, 1834)

Synonyms
- List: Astraea tesserifera Ehrenberg, 1834; Favia complanata Ehrenberg, 1834; Prionastraea tesserifera (Ehrenberg, 1834)

= Favites complanata =

Species of coral

Favites complanata is a species of stony coral in the family Merulinidae, sometimes known as the larger star coral. It is native to the Indo-Pacific region and its range extends from the Red Sea and Indian Ocean to the western and central Pacific Ocean. This is an uncommon species of coral and seems to be decreasing in abundance, and the International Union for Conservation of Nature has rated its conservation status as being "near threatened".

== Description ==
A colony of Favites complanata forms a solid dome or mound. The corallites (stony cups in which the polyps sit) are large and somewhat angular, with thick, rounded walls between them. The calyces are 8 to 12 millimetres (0.3 to 0.5 in) in diameter. The septa (stony ridges inside the corallites) are in two whorls and each has four or five teeth. The paliform lobes are distinct on the first whorl of septa and the columella at the centre of the corallite is large. The stony ridges, now known as costae, continue between the corallites and often form three-pointed stars where the walls of three corallites join. This coral is usually a dull brown colour, the oral discs of the polyps sometimes being a contrasting green or grey colour.

== Distribution ==
Favites complanata is found in the western and central Indo-Pacific. Its range extends from Madagascar, the Seychelles and the Red Sea to India, the Maldives, Australia, Japan and the East China Sea. It is present in various reef habitats at depths down to about 30 metres (100 ft).

== Ecology ==
The polyps of Favites complanata expand and extend their tentacles to catch plankton, but much of the nutritional requirements of this coral are met by the zooxanthellae housed within its tissues. These symbiotic unicellular dinoflagellates use photosynthesis to create organic molecules. In adverse conditions, such as when the coral is stressed by high temperatures, the zooxanthellae may be expelled and the coral becomes bleached and white. Bleaching occurs in this species when the water temperature rises above 30 °C (86 °F).
