= George Matthai =

Indian marine zoologist

George Matthai (13 November 1887 – 22 June 1947) was an Indian zoologist who specialized in marine biology, contributing to the systematics of Madreporarian (now Scleractinia) corals. He was a professor of zoology at the Panjab University in Lahore.

== Life and career ==
He returned to India in 1918 and worked at the department of zoology at the Panjab University, Lahore. He received a ScD from the University of Cambridge in 1929. He succeeded Lt. Col. J. Stephenson in 1919 and his retirement in 1942 was postponed to 1945 due to the war.

Matthai married Mary Chandy, daughter of C. Chandy of the Mysore Civil Service and later vice chancellor of Mysore University, in 1925. They had a son, Ariel, and after her death in 1931, Matthai married Rosalinda Hedwig in 1935. Matthai was elected Fellow of the Zoological Society of London in 1921, as well as the Linnean Society.
