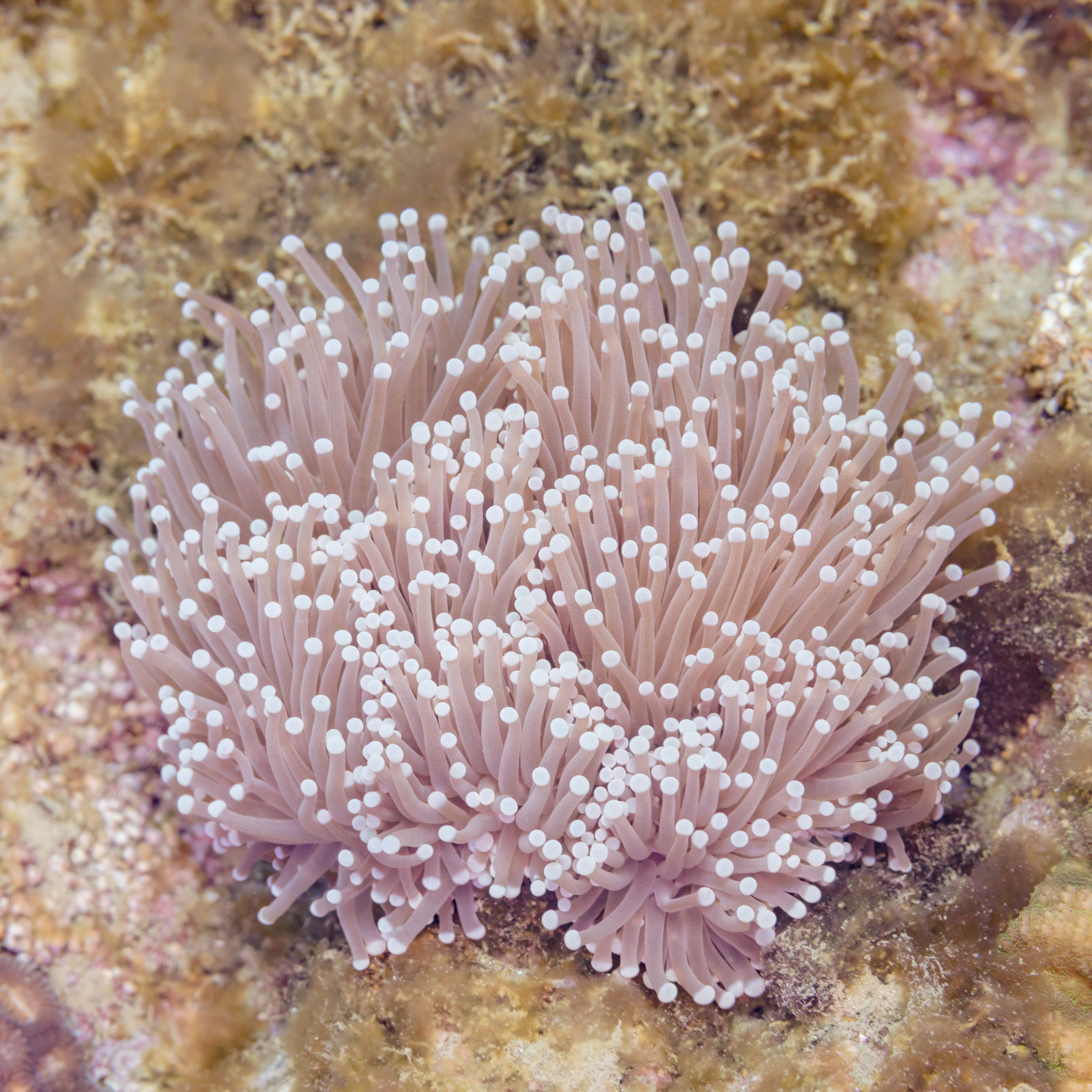

Conservation status
- Least Concern (IUCN 3.1)

Scientific classification
- Kingdom: Animalia
- Phylum: Cnidaria
- Subphylum: Anthozoa
- Class: Hexacorallia
- Order: Scleractinia
- Family: Fungiidae
- Genus: Heliofungia
- Species: H. actiniformis

Binomial name
- Heliofungia actiniformis (Quoy & Gaimard, 1833)

Synonyms
- List: Fungia actiniformis Quoy & Gaimard, 1833; Fungia actinodiscus Umbgrove, 1950 †; Fungia crassitentaculata Quoy & Gaimard, 1833; Fungia diversidens Milne Edwards & Haime, 1851; Fungia granulicostata Umbgrove, 1946 †

= Heliofungia actiniformis =

Species of coral

Heliofungia actiniformis is a solitary species of mushroom coral, a large polyp stony coral in the family Fungiidae. This coral is found in shallow water in the Indo-Pacific region, as it is a zooxanthellate. H. actiniformis is a popular coral in the reef aquarium trade; wild populations are threatened by disease, climate change, and over-collection for the aquarium trade, and the species is considered vulnerable by the IUCN.

== Description ==
Although fixed to the substrate as a juvenile (being sessile), this coral becomes detached later and is free-living as an adult. It is circular or oval with a diameter of up to 20 centimetres (8 in) and height of 7 centimetres (3 in). The corallum (stony skeleton) is thick and solid. The septa (stony ridges) are in several orders. The early order septa are larger than later order ones and have more prominent, lobe-like or triangular teeth. All the septa are granulate, and continue to the underside of the corallum as fine ridges known as costae. There is an attachment scar in the centre of the underside. The polyp is thick and fleshy and has a single mouth surrounded by thick tentacles with knobs on the end. The tentacles are nearly always extended and superficially resembles a large sea anemone.

== Distribution and ecology ==
Heliofungia actiniformis is native to the eastern Indian Ocean and the central Indo-Pacific region, the northwestern, northern and eastern coasts of Australia, Japan, the South China Sea and the island groups of the West Pacific. Its depth range is between about 1 and 25 metres (3 and 82 ft). It usually occurs on reef slopes or on reef flats.

H. actiniformis is a zooxanthellate coral, containing tiny photosynthetic, symbiotic organisms in its tissues. During the day these supply the coral with much of its metabolic needs. The coral also feeds on zooplankton which are caught by the tentacles. Besides reproducing sexually by liberating eggs and sperm into the water column (spawning), this coral sometimes buds off a new polyp. Polyps of H. actiniformis provide a micro-habitat to a wide range of associated fauna from cleaner shrimps to juvenile fishes.

== Relation to humans ==
=== Aquaculture ===
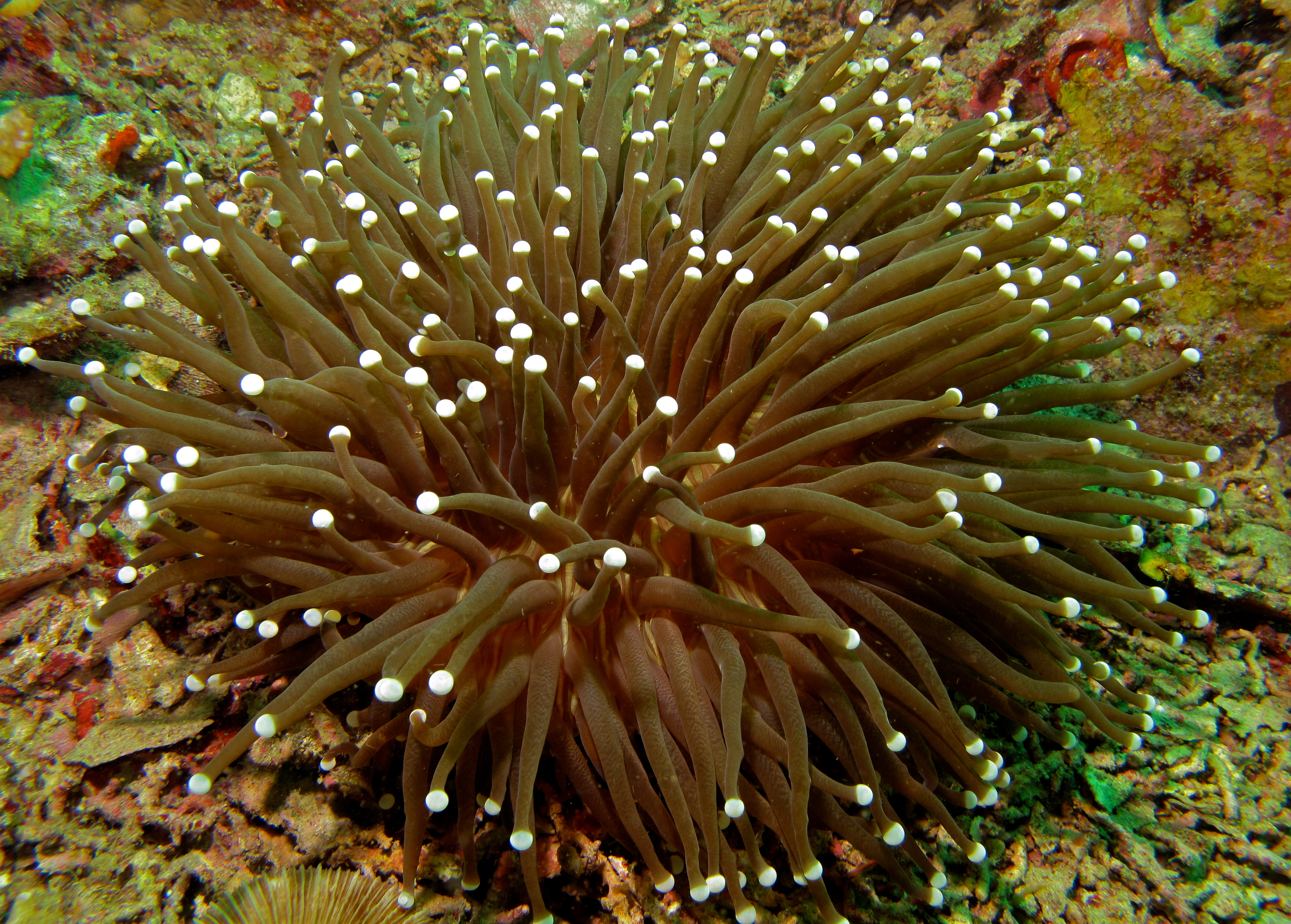
H. actiniformis in Sibuan Island, Sabah, Malaysia

Many corals can be increased in number by detaching pieces of a colony and attaching them to the substrate. That is not possible with large polyp stony corals such as Heliofungia actiniformis, but it is hoped to remedy this by placing collecting devices above them when spawning is about to occur, mixing the eggs and sperm under controlled conditions and nurturing the larvae in tanks. The technique has been successfully applied to Acropora formosa. It is hoped that the resulting offspring will be able to be used to repopulate damaged reefs or to relieve the pressure of collecting corals from the wild for the reef aquarium trade.

=== Status ===
Although this coral is common in some localities, it is vulnerable to the degradation processes which are occurring on coral reefs. It is susceptible to coral diseases and to coral bleaching and is likely to be threatened by climate change. It is also heavily collected for the aquarium trade, being one of the top 10 exported corals from Indonesia, the largest exporter of the species. In 2005, about 50,000 individuals were collected and exported from Indonesia. For these reasons, the International Union for Conservation of Nature has assessed its conservation status as "least concern".
