= Hans Lollik Islands =

Pair of privately-owned islands in the US Virgin Islands

Coordinates: 18°23′53″N 64°54′29″W

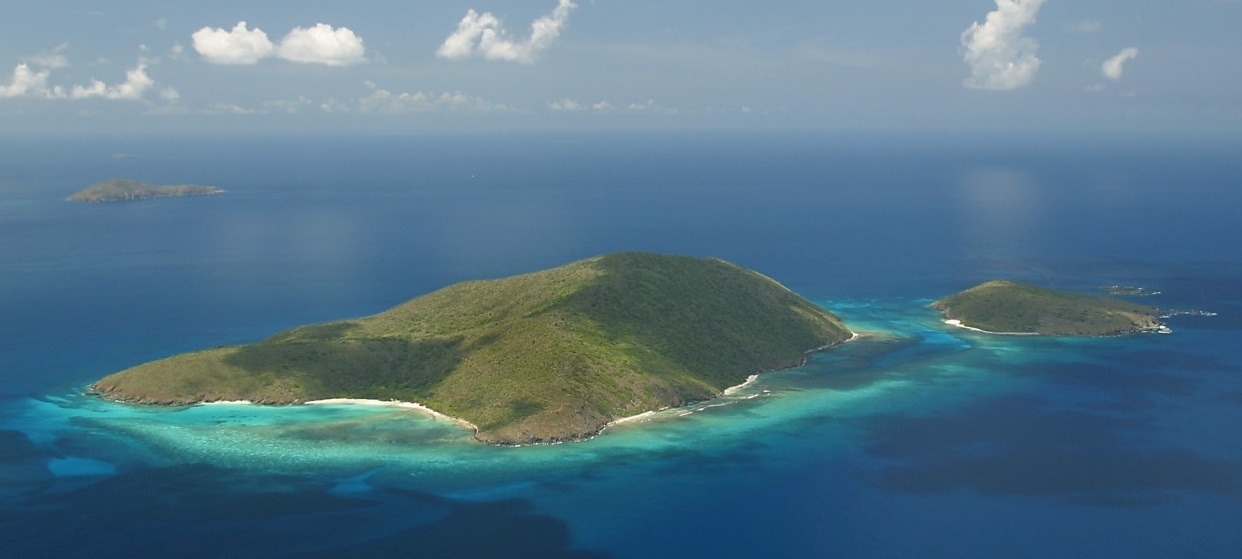
Great and Little Hans Lollik Islands

The Hans Lollik Islands are two islands in the U.S. Virgin Islands owned by Larry Page. In 2014, Page bought Great Hans Lollik Island ("GHL") and its smaller neighbor, Little Hans Lollik, for $23 million.

GHL is about 8,000 feet (2½ km) beyond the central northshore of St. Thomas, U.S. Virgin Islands, separated from St. Thomas by the Leeward Passage. Little Hans Lollik and Pelican Cay lie to the north of Hans Lollik on the same shelf. The major part of the benthic zone around Hans Lollik is rocky and supports a dense diverse coral habitat.

In Danish, "Hans Lollik" means "Hans from Lolland", believed to refer to a sailor by that name.

== Terrestrial features ==
The terrestrial features of the Hans Lollik group are functions of their natural topography, exposure to trade winds, and consequences of human occupation. The east and northeast slopes experience regular northeasterly trade winds.

Human occupation, particularly by Europeans after they found the island at the end of the 15th century, has changed the island's ecology. From the early 18th century to the 1850s, the Virgin Islands were clear-cut and farmed. Local historians estimate that about 30 to 40 acres (12 to 16 ha) of GHL was cultivated for cotton during this period. The steep profile of the island caused exposed soil to creep and wash into the sea as sediment run-off; some estimate that several feet of topsoil were lost during this agricultural period. In the 1940s and 1950s, GHL was logged for timber which was sold in St. Croix, U.S. Virgin Islands. Seed stock for species once present on the island no longer exists locally. Fire allowed resistant species (e.g., thatch palm) to dominate, and logging left stock for a future forest canopy dominated by softwoods (e.g., loblolly pine, blolly, and Geiger tree).

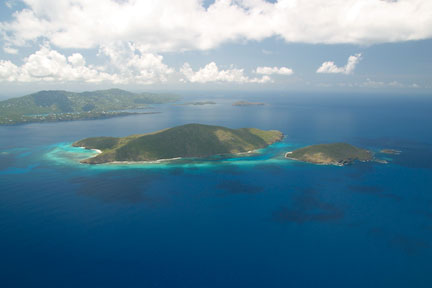
Great and Little Hans Lollik Islands with St. Thomas visible in the background

== Animal life ==
No native terrestrial mammals live on Great Hans Lollik or Little Hans Lollik. The black rat (Rattus rattus) was introduced by early European settlers within the last 500 years. The European rabbit (Oryctolagus cuniculus), cats (Felis catus), and donkeys (Equus asinus) have been intentionally released. There should be four native species of bats present: Noctilio leporinus (a fishing bat), Molossus molossus (a small insectivore), Jamaican fruit bat Artibeus jamaicensis, and Antillean fruit-eating bat Brachyphylla cavernarum (a pollen and nectar feeder).

=== Reptiles and amphibians ===
The herpetofauna of Hans Lollik has not been well studied, but species composition should closely resemble that of St. Thomas. Several species of lizards, common on nearby islands, have never been documented on Hans Lollik.

Based on their distribution and habitat requirements on surrounding islands, one might expect the following species to be present as well: Iguana iguana, Hemidactylus mabouia, Spondylurus semitaeniatus and Amphisbaena fenestrata. Iguana pinguis, a species endemic to the Puerto Rico Bank, has been extirpated from most developed islands in the region, but might survive on one or more of the islands in the study area. Two snakes found on St. Thomas might occur on Hans Lollik: Typhlops richardii and Liophis exequuis. Liophis portoricensis (a lizard-eating ground snake) has been reduced in numbers or extirpated on the large islands within its range.

=== Avifauna ===
Many bird species are seasonal visitors to the offshore cays and are only in evidence at Hans Lollik during the summer breeding season. The most conspicuous birds at the study sites are the resident seabird species, including the brown booby (Sula melanogaster) and the brown pelican (Pelecanus occidentalis). Both species utilize the bait-rich waters of Hans Lollik for feeding; both species target white fry, blue fry, or false pilchard as preferred prey. The prime roosting spots for these species have been located and mapped by JDA to enable the site planning process to avoid these areas. Hans Lollik has no critical nesting sites for any bird species. The cliff-site nesting areas for the tropic bird are de facto protected from humans by their precarious cliff location.

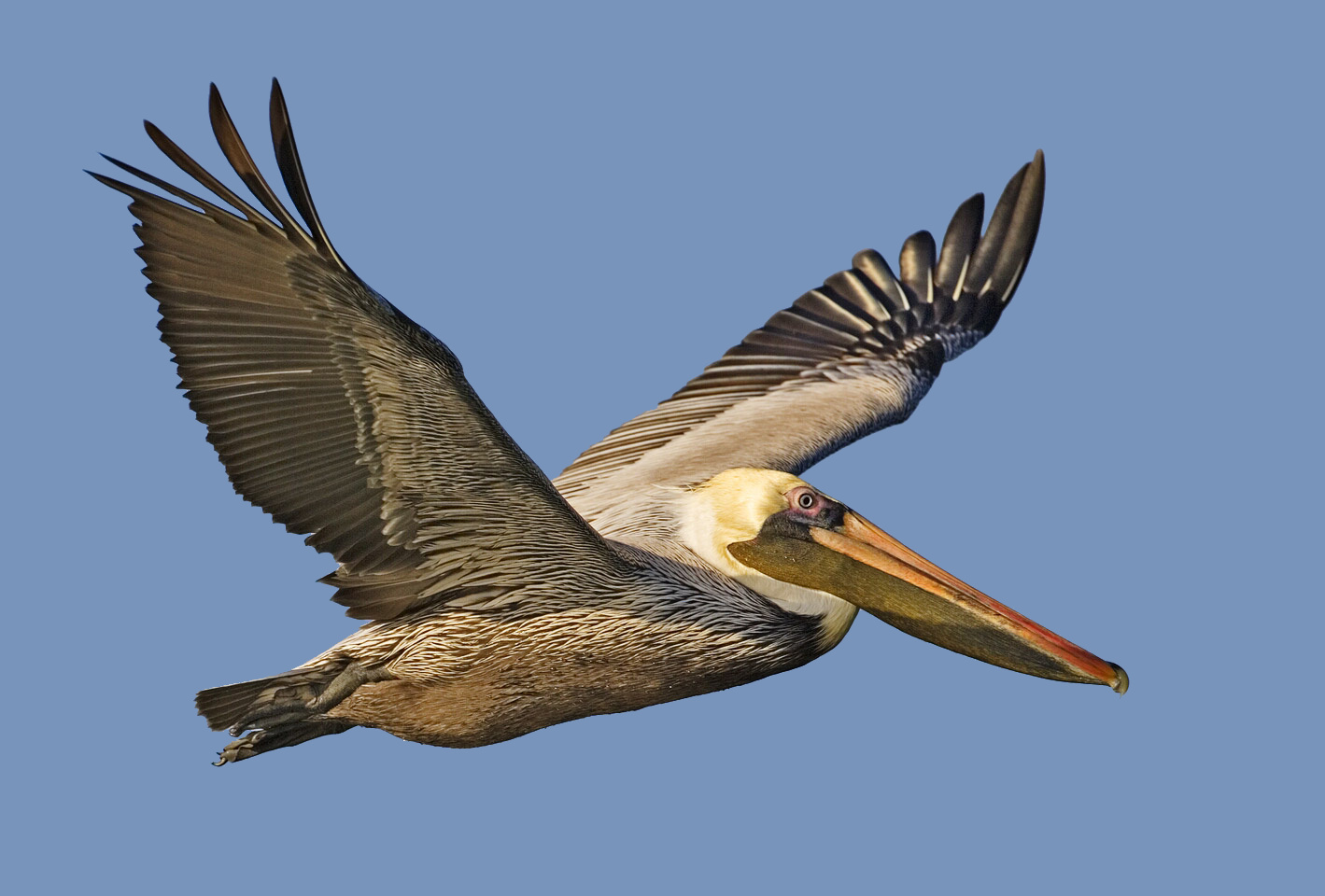
Brown pelican

Hans Lollik has not been a historically important brown pelican-nesting site, and the sparse nesting which now occurs is opportunistic. This nesting may well be the result of a booming local population of pelicans, which is spreading out to new roosting and nesting sites, or it may be the result of displacement from other islands and cays. The brown pelican is listed as endangered, both federally and by the Virgin Islands. The brown pelican was once thought to be doomed due to the eggshell-thinning events brought about by DDT contamination. Since the DDT ban went into effect, brown pelican populations throughout the US have recovered, causing the species to be delisted throughout much of its range. The southeast U.S. (including Virgin Islands) populations have not yet been delisted, but indications are that these populations are also recovering.

Noddy terns (Anous stolidus), least terns (Sterna albifrons), sooty terns (Sterna fuscata), and royal terns (Thalasseus maximus) have all been recorded as nesting on nearby Pelican Cay, but not on Hans Lollik Island. Other bird species seen on Hans Lollik include the ubiquitous pearly-eyed thrasher (Margarops fuscatus), the bananaquit (Coeroba flaveloa), the oystercatcher (Haematopus pallitus), and the sparrowhawk (Falco sparverius).

== Benthic features ==
The area between Hans Lollik and Little Hans Lollik is relatively shallow and is primarily a hard bottom with scattered large patches of sand and cobble. Currents flowing between the two islands are generally to the west, and are often quite swift. The shallows along the shores of both islands are colonized by head corals, Diploria strigosa, D. clivosa, Siderastrea siderea, D. labyrinthiformis, Colpophyllia natans, Porites astreoides, Montastraea annularis, M. cavernosa and Dendrogyra cylindrus. There are scattered elkhorn coral Acropora palmata, and staghorn coral A. cervicornis. In the shallower areas, less than 10 ft (3 m) most of the Acropora is alive, while deeper there are numerous skeletons of these once massive spreading corals. There are also some very large remnants of Porites porites colonies that lie between the two islands. Some of these mounds are 10 to 12 ft (3 to 4 m) in height and width. Agarcia, Millepora, P. porites, and a variety of sponge species have colonize the dead coral of these mounds. The entire area is destiny colonized by soft coral species and sea plumes, fans feathers are scattered throughout. To the southwest there is a sandy beach, and the sand extends offshore into the benthic environment. Within this sandy area there are emergent areas of rock that have become colonized by corals (Siderastrea and Diploria) and algae. Further offshore there is shallow reef area affected by waves. The reef area supports of variety of soft and hard coral colonization. Along the western side of the island and along the northwestern tip the shoreline is rocky, and the rock extends below the sea. There are large boulders and slabs of rock that lie just below the waters surface along the shore. A diverse community of corals and sponges colonizes this rock substrate that rapidly drops to a depth of 20 to 25 ft (6 to 8 m). Head corals (Diploria strigosa, D. clivosa, Sidereastrea siderea, D. labyrinthiformis, Colpophyllia natans, Porites astreoides, Montastrea annularis, M. cavernosa and Dendrogyra cylindrus), branching corals (Acropora palmate, A cervicornis, Porites porites), and fire corals (Millepora spp.) are common within this area.

== Cetaceans and other marine species ==
The most common cetacean species to move through the waters of the greater Hans Lollik area include bottlenose dolphins ('Tursiops truncatus) and humpback whales (Megaptera novaeangliae). Some pilot whales (Globicephala melaena) may also occur in the area. The presence of humpback whales is seasonal, with peak migrations occurring during January through March. In addition to reef fish, schooling fish have been evaluated in the area around GHL and Litte Hans Lollik. Fish abundance is greatest in the offshore area of the east coast fringing reef and in the deep-water areas off the northwest corner of GHL. Three sea turtle species occur around the island: the hawksbill turtle, green turtle, and leatherback turtle..

== Prehistoric and historic human occupation ==
No significant evidence of prehistoric aboriginal occupation of the island has been found. Based upon historic accounts, a series of cotton plantation establishments were apparently developed and maintained from at least 1769, but probably several decades earlier. This occupancy continued until the mid-nineteenth century, followed by another enterprise in the 1950s. More recent uses have included logging, fishing, residence by an individual, and cattle raising in the 1950s when the existing overgrown circumferential road was created. An underwater survey of the bays on Hans Lollik failed to find any archaeological or cultural resources of importance. In Coconut Bay, a modern shipwreck was identified some years ago.

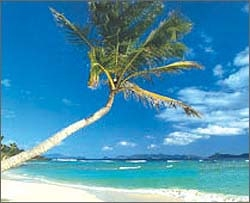
Palm tree on Great Hans Lollik's Coconut Bay

== Trade winds ==
The Virgin Islands lie in the “Easterlies” or “Trade Winds” which traverse the southern part of the "Bermuda High" pressure area. Thus, the predominant winds are usually from the east-northeast and east. These trade winds vary seasonally and are broadly divided into four seasonal modes: December to February; March to May; June to August; and September to November. There are numerous disturbances during the year, especially squalls and thunderstorms. These occur most frequently during the summer, lasting only a few hours and cause no pronounced change in the trade winds..

== Nearby small islands and cays ==
- Necker Island, BVI - Owned by Sir Richard Branson
- Guana Island & Norman Island, BVI - Owned by Henry Jarecki
- Great Saint James
