= Corallovexiidae =

Scientific classification
- Kingdom: Animalia
- Phylum: Arthropoda
- Clade: Pancrustacea
- Class: Copepoda
- Order: Cyclopoida
- Suborder: Ergasilida
- Family: Corallovexiidae; Stock, 1975

Genera
- Corallonoxia Stock, 1975; Corallovexia Stock, 1975

Family of crustaceans

The Corallovexiidae are a family of strictly marine parasitic copepods associated with corals and, together with members of the family Asterocheridae, dominate their ecological niche in the West Indies; in the Indo-Pacific, they are replaced by the families Lichomolgidae and Xarifiidae.

The family contains two genera and at least 10 species, all described by Jan Hendrik Stock in 1975. After the 10 known and described species, there were three unknown species found in the Labrador Sea and one more found in the Curaçao.

== Description ==
Members of Corallovexiidae are typically semi-transparent or opaque with an off-white color. All members have a dark dot on its head visible through their exoskeleton. Adults are around 2-5mm in length, and exhibit sexual dimorphism.

Corallovexiidae females are smaller than their male counterparts and have four pairs of long pereonites, or lateral horns, as opposed to the males' two. Both males and females have well defined labrum, but the females have two oral appendages.

Regarding antennae, the anterior antennae across both sexes are almost identical, but the posterior antennae differ by segmentation; the males' antennae segments are clearly articulated, as opposed to the females', whose segments are less distinct. They only have one pair of thoracic appendages, which are level with the first and second pereonites.

The females' ovaries are on the left and right sides of their metasome, but the explicit egg sacs have never been found.

== Classification ==
Corallovexiidae contains two genera, Corallonoxia and Corallovexia. Three unknown species of Corallovexiidae are not listed here. The Corallovexiidae family's main shared homology is the presence of pereonite.

Phylogenically, their closest relatives are the Antheacheridae, which also have large lateral horns, but Coravexiidae lacks the pygmy males present in Antheacheridae. Members of Antheacheridae also do not have as well defined pereonites as Coravexiidae. Another key difference is Antheacheridae's lack of a caudal ramus.

Below is a list of named species:

Corallonoxia Stock, 1975
- Corallonoxia baki Stock, 1975
- Corallonoxia longicauda Stock, 1975
Corallovexia Stock, 1975
- Corallovexia brevibrachium Stock, 1975
- Corallovexia dorsospinosa Stock, 1975
- Corallovexia kristenseni Stock, 1975
- Corallovexia longibrachium Stock, 1975
- Corallovexia mediobrachium Stock, 1975
- Corallovexia mixtibrachium Stock, 1975
- Corallovexia similis Stock, 1975
- Corallovexia ventrospinosa Stock, 1975

== Ecology ==
The Corallovexiidae described above only infect one polyp and reside there for life. The number of copepods infecting a single polyp differs among latitude; for example, one study found a Diploria clivosa polyp from Curaçao containing over 200 copepods (all C. mediobrachium), while the maximum number found in Halipteris finmarchica was 3.

Members of Corallovexiidae are endoparasitic, and are usually found in its hosts' mesoglea or mesentery, but the unknown species from the Labrador Sea were found in the reproductive organs of their respective corals. The undescribed Corallovexiidae limited yolk deposition in H. finmarchica, and when abundant in a colony, lowers its fecundity.

Within H. finmarchica polyps, males were always found with females, but females were also found living alone. The sex ratio is highly in favor of the females.

Regarding life history, an intensive study into Corallovexia longicauda discovered that, during its larval stages it has a very short pelagic span, quickly settling on floating coral larvae after hatching. Due to the small chance that C. longicauda larvae "hits" the floating coral larvae, very few survive. However, if it happens, C. longicauda will populate the growing polyp and create a colony. The colony will end up sustaining itself through self-infestation. Overall, the parasite has minimal effects on its host. This may or may not apply to other members of the family.

== Distribution ==
Members of Corallovexiidae are found primarily in the waters near Curaçao, but unknown species have been found near the coasts of the Labrador Sea. Depending on the species of Corallovexiidae and the species of the host, they can be found anywhere from 0.5 - 40m deep, usually on the ocean floor. The most abundant species of Corallovexiidae is Corallovexia brevibrachium.

The following is a table of preferred depths and common hosts for members of the Corallovexiidae family:

Species Name	Preferred Depths (m)	Hosts
Corallonoxia baki	4 - 6	Caryophylliidae, Dendrogyra cylindrus, Eusmilia fastigiata, Faviidae
Corallonoxia longicauda	3 - 30	Caryophylliidae, Dendrogyra cylindrus, Faviidae, Meandrina meandrites, Trochosmiliidae
Corallovexia brevibrachium	4 - 6	Diploria labyrinthiformis
Corallovexia dorsospinosa	6 - 24	Montastraea brasiliana, Montastraea cavernosa
Corallovexia kristenseni	5 - 9	Colpophyllia natans
Corallovexia longibrachium	4 - 15	Colpophyllia natans, Diploria strigosa, Manicina areolata
Corallovexia mediobrachium	0.3 - 4	Diploria clivosa, Diploria strigosa
Corallovexia mixtibrachium	5 - 10	Colpophyllia natans
Corallovexia similis	1.1 - 2	Acropora palmata
Corallovexia ventrospinosa	4 - 40	Montastraea brasiliana, Montastraea cavernosa
Undescribed Corallovexiidae (Labrador Sea)	Unknown	Halipteris finmarchica
Undescribed Corallovexiidae (Curaçao)	Unknown	Mycetophyllia lamarckiana
