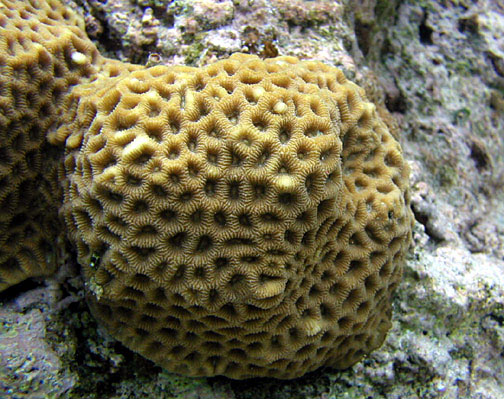
- Favites abdita in the family Merulinidae
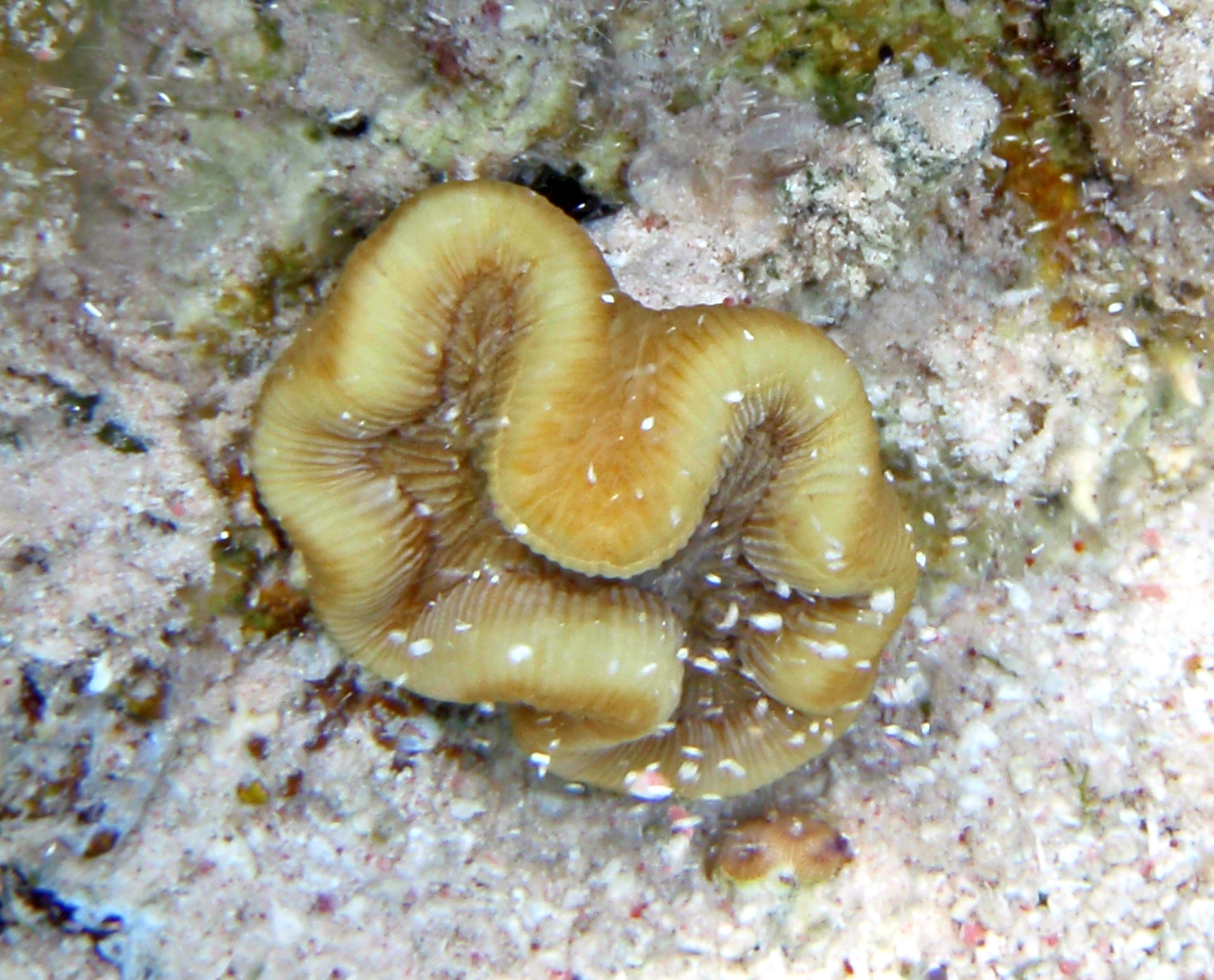
- Manicina areolata in the family Mussidae (Faviidae)

Scientific classification
- Kingdom: Animalia
- Phylum: Cnidaria
- Subphylum: Anthozoa
- Class: Hexacorallia
- Order: Scleractinia

Groups included
- Mussidae; Merulinidae

= Brain coral =

Brain coral Temporal range: Middle Triassic–Recent

Common name for various corals

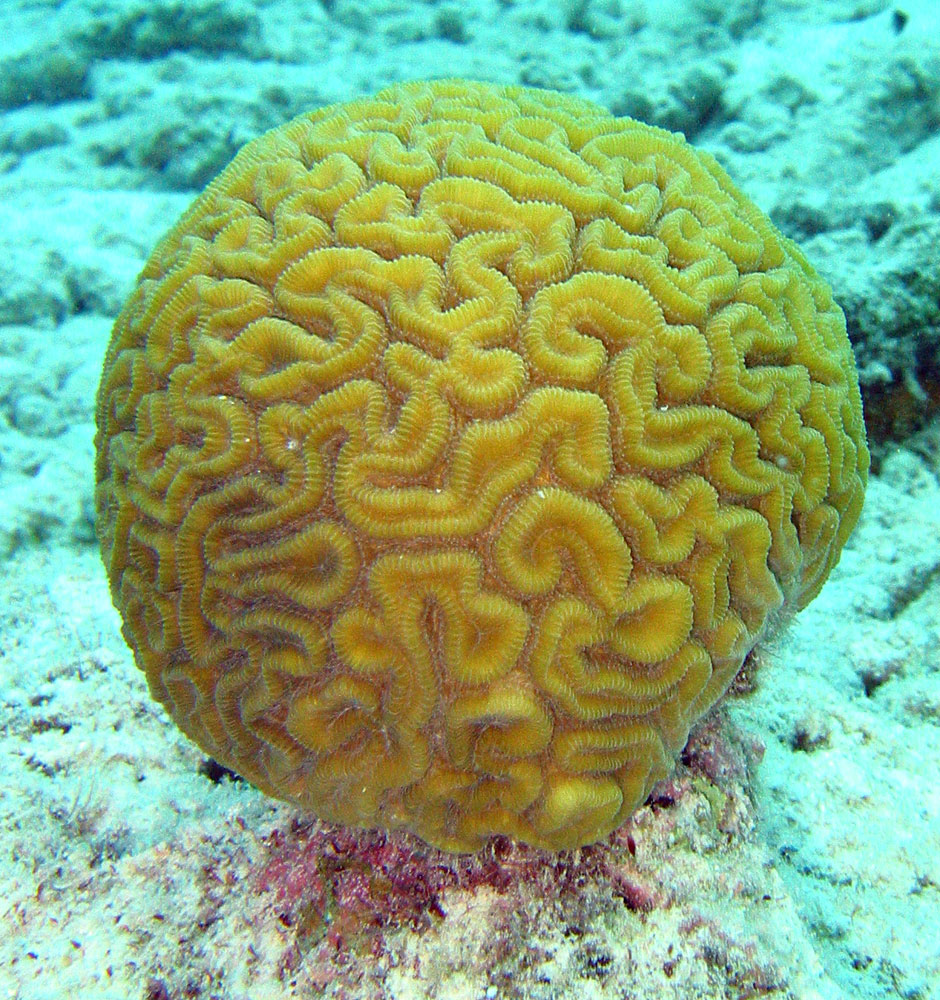
Diploria labyrinthiformis (grooved brain coral)

Brain coral is a common name given to various corals in the families Mussidae and Merulinidae, so called due to their generally spheroid shape and grooved surface, which resembles a brain. Each head of coral is formed by a colony of genetically identical polyps which secrete a hard skeleton of calcium carbonate; this makes them important coral reef builders like other stony corals in the order Scleractinia. Brain corals are found in shallow warm water coral reefs in all the world's oceans. They are part of the phylum Cnidaria, in a class called Anthozoa or "flower animals". The lifespan of the largest brain corals is 900 years. Colonies can grow as large as 1.8 m (6 ft) or more in height.

Brain corals extend their tentacles to catch food at night. During the day, they use their tentacles for protection by wrapping them over the grooves on their surface. The surface is hard and offers good protection against fish or hurricanes. Branching corals, such as staghorn corals, grow more rapidly, but are more vulnerable to storm damage. Like other genera of corals, brain corals feed on small drifting animals, and also receive nutrients provided by the algae which live within their tissues. The behavior of one of the most common genera, Favia, is semiaggressive; it will sting other corals with its extended sweeper tentacles during the night.

The grooved surface of brain corals has been used by scientists to investigate methods of giving spherical wheels appropriate grip strength.

== Genera ==
- Barabattoia Yabe and Sugiyama, 1941
- Bikiniastrea Wells, 1954
- Caulastraea Dana, 1846 – candy cane coral
- Colpophyllia Milne-Edwards and Haime, 1848 – boulder brain coral or large-grooved brain coral
- Cyphastrea Milne-Edwards and Haime, 1848
- Diploastrea Matthai, 1914 – diploastrea brain coral or honeycomb coral
- Diploria Milne-Edwards and Haime, 1848 – grooved brain coral
- Echinopora Lamarck, 1816
- Erythrastrea Pichon, Scheer and Pillai, 1983
- Favia Oken, 1815
- Favites Link, 1807 – moon, pineapple, brain, closed brain, star, worm, or honeycomb coral
- Goniastrea Milne-Edwards and Haime, 1848
- Leptastrea Milne-Edwards and Haime, 1848
- Leptoria Milne-Edwards and Haime, 1848 – great star coral
- Manicina Ehrenberg, 1834
- Montastraea de Blainville, 1830 – great star coral
- Moseleya Quelch, 1884
- Oulastrea Milne-Edwards and Haime, 1848
- Oulophyllia Milne-Edwards and Haime, 1848
- Parasimplastrea Sheppard, 1985
- Platygyra Ehrenberg, 1834
- Plesiastrea Milne-Edwards and Haime, 1848
- Pseudodiploria Ellis & Solander, 1786
- Solenastrea Milne-Edwards and Haime, 1848

== Gallery ==
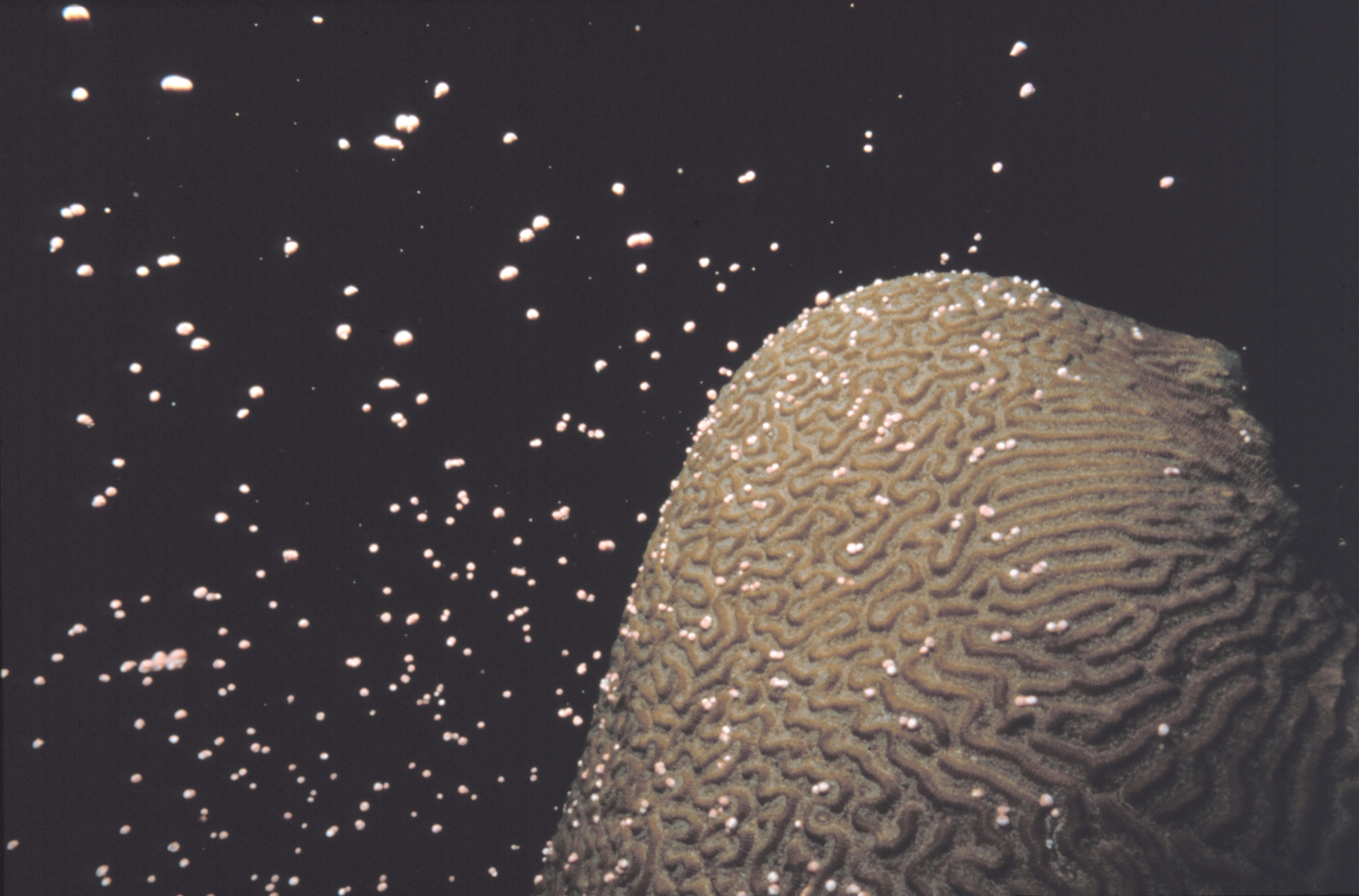
Brain coral spawning

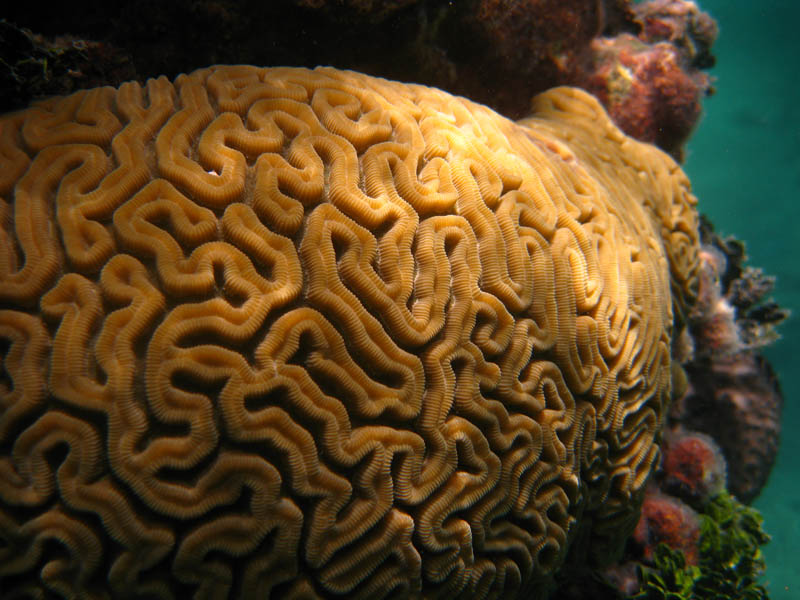
Brain coral, Caribbean Sea near Esperanza on the island of Vieques, Puerto Rico

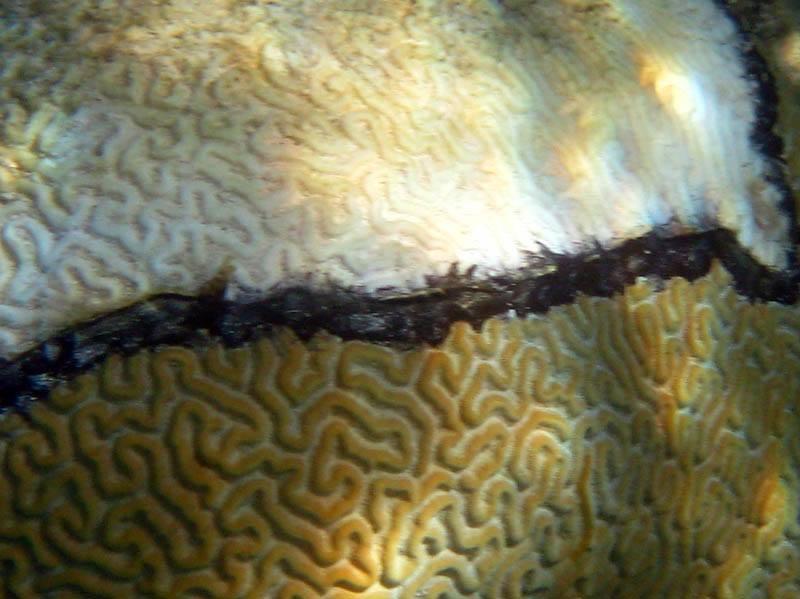
Black band disease on a brain coral in Caribbean Sea near Bahia de la Chiva on the island of Vieques

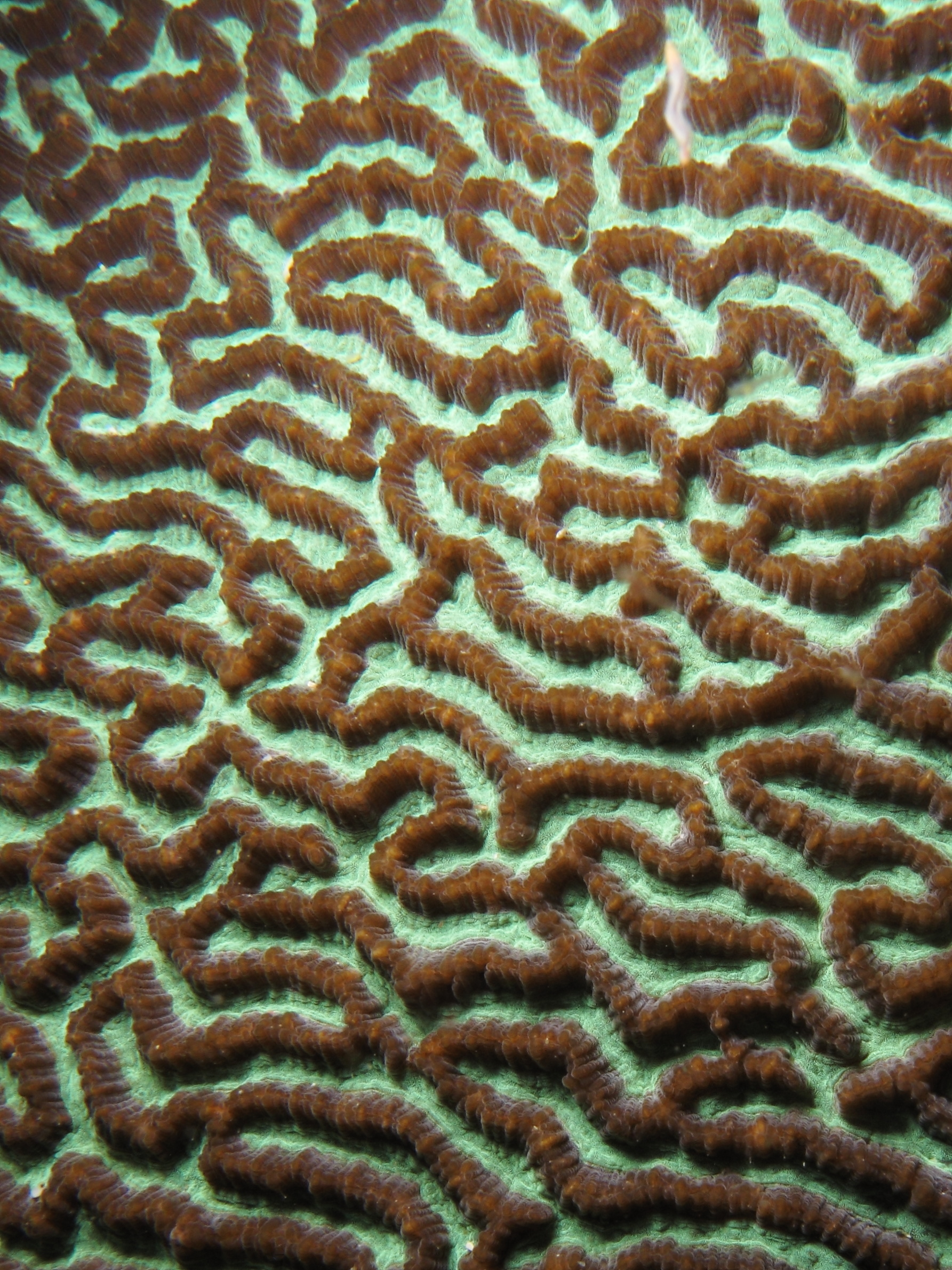
Close-up of a brain coral near Nusa Kode Island, Indonesia

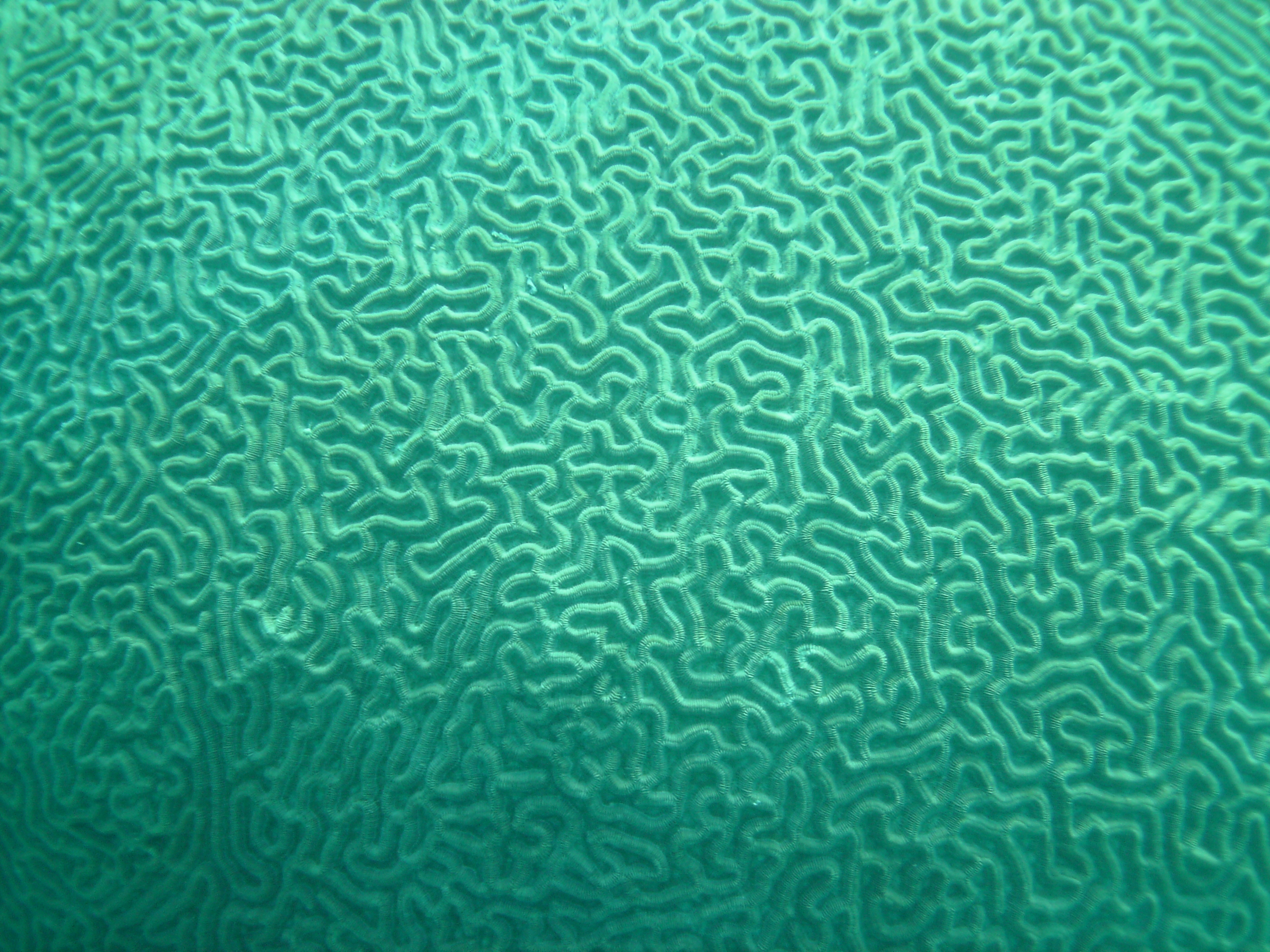
Closeup of Diploria strigosa, Snapper Ledge, Florida Keys

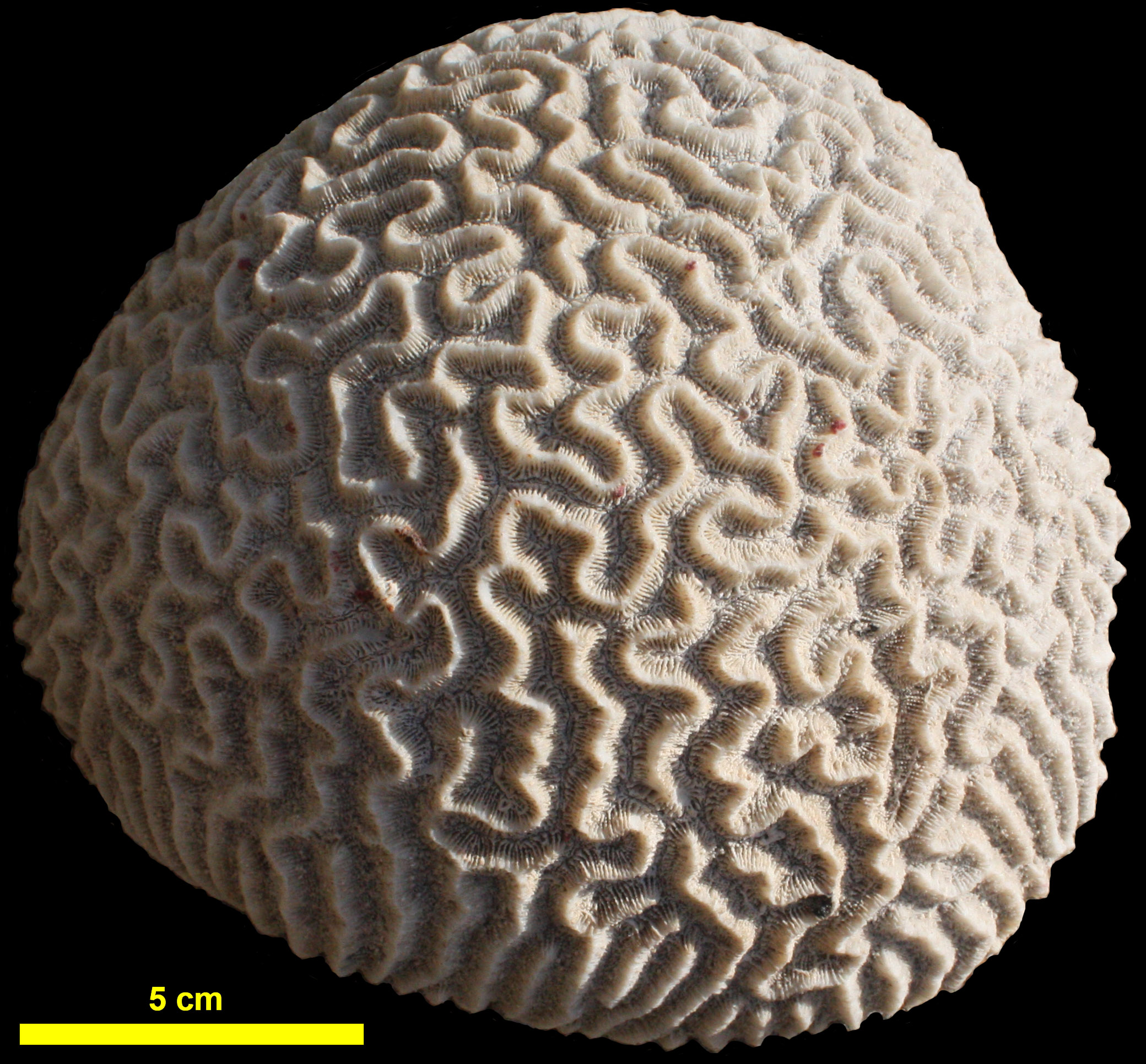
Diploria clivosa (dead), San Salvador Island, Bahamas

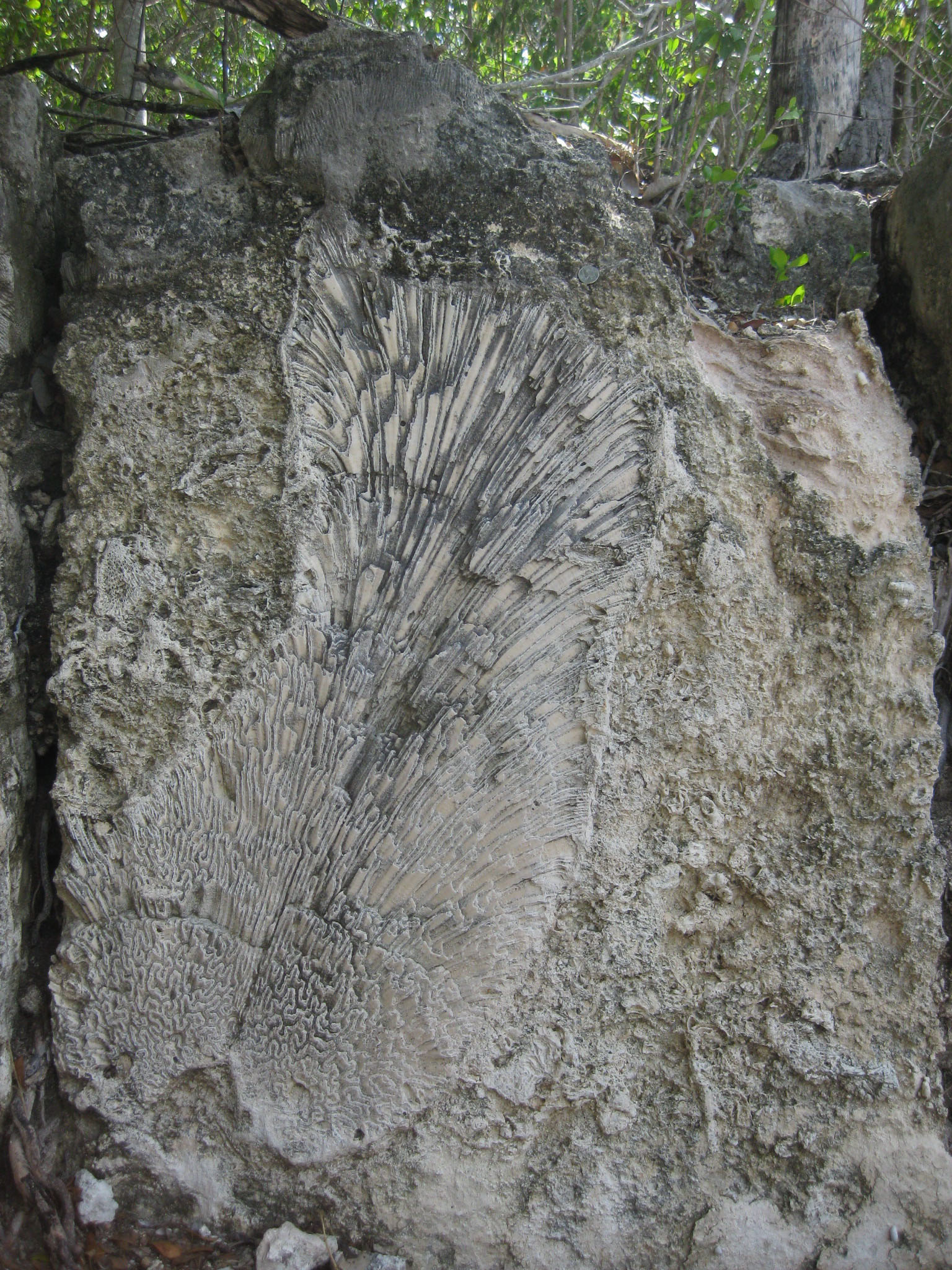
Fossil Diploria at the Windley Key Fossil Reef Geological State Park, of Pleistocene age

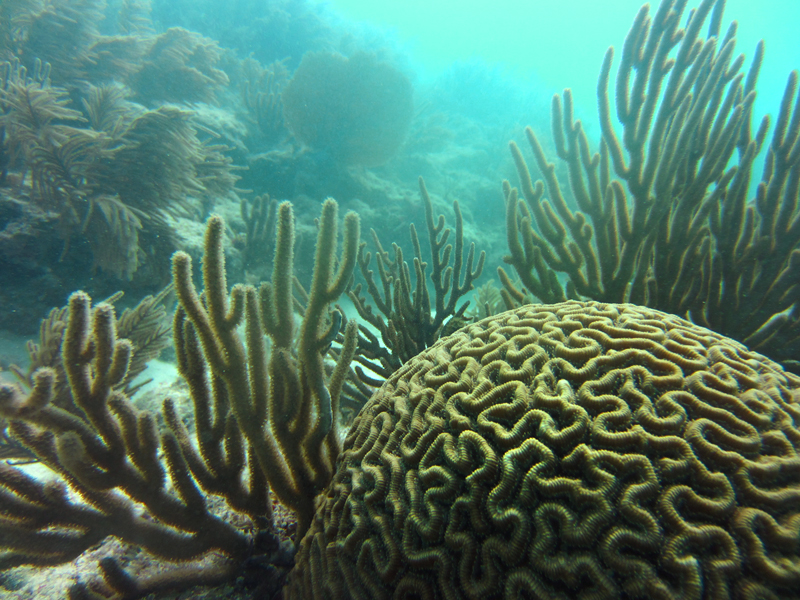
Diploria strigosa, in the near shore waters of Key West, Florida

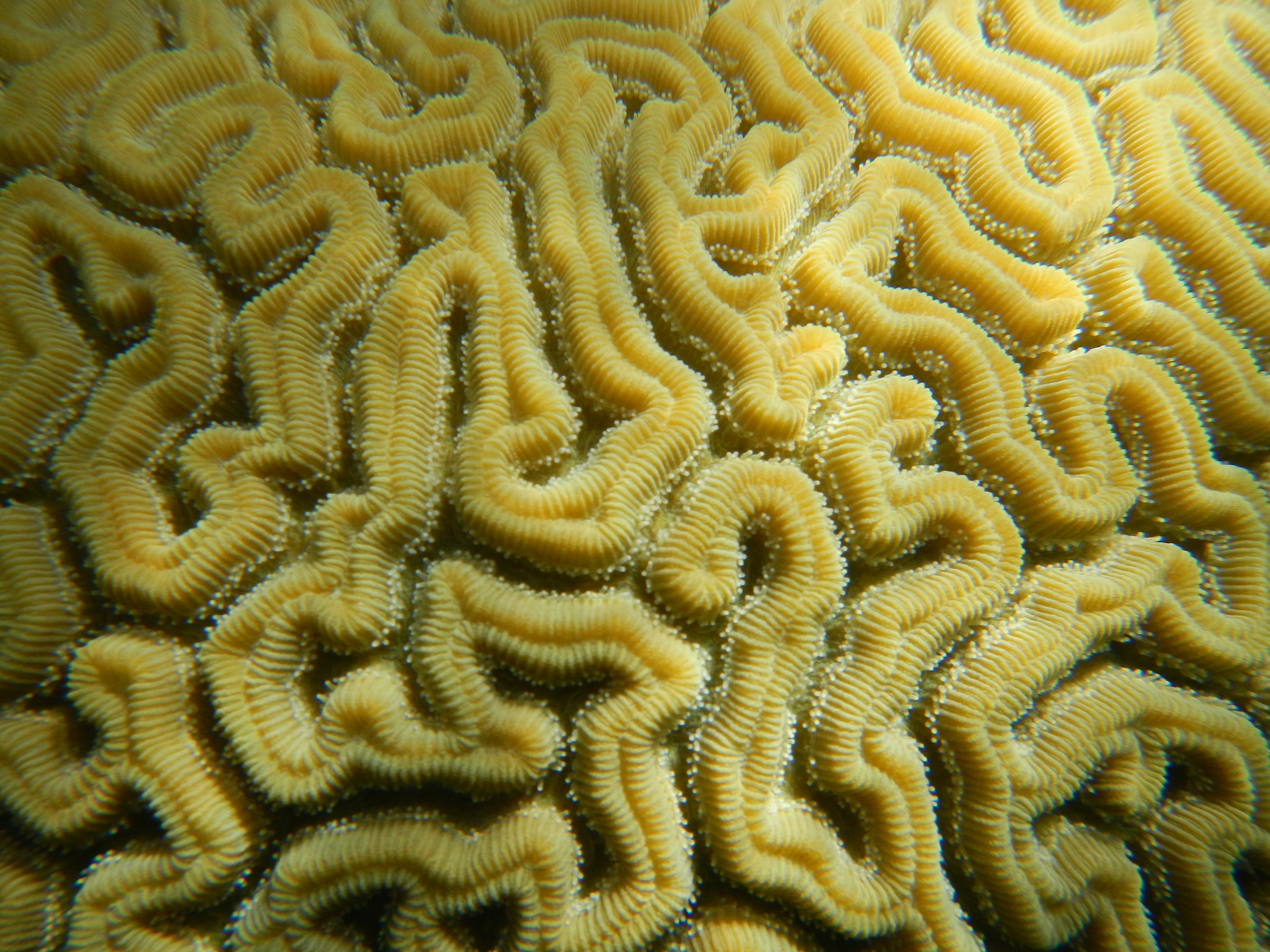
Close up of Diploria labyrinthiformis with visible polyps, Vieques, Puerto Rico
