= Leeward Passage =

Channel in the United States Virgin Islands

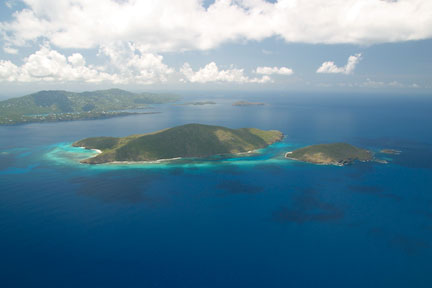
- Great and Little Hans Lollik Islands with St. Thomas visible in the background beyond Leeward Passage.

- Location within the U.S. Virgin Islands Location within Lesser Antilles Location within the Caribbean
- Coordinates: 18°22′23″N 64°53′59″W
- Basin countries: United States Virgin Islands

The Leeward Passage is a channel between Hans Lollik Island and northern St. Thomas Island in the United States Virgin Islands in the West Indies. It is one of the smallest channels in the US.
