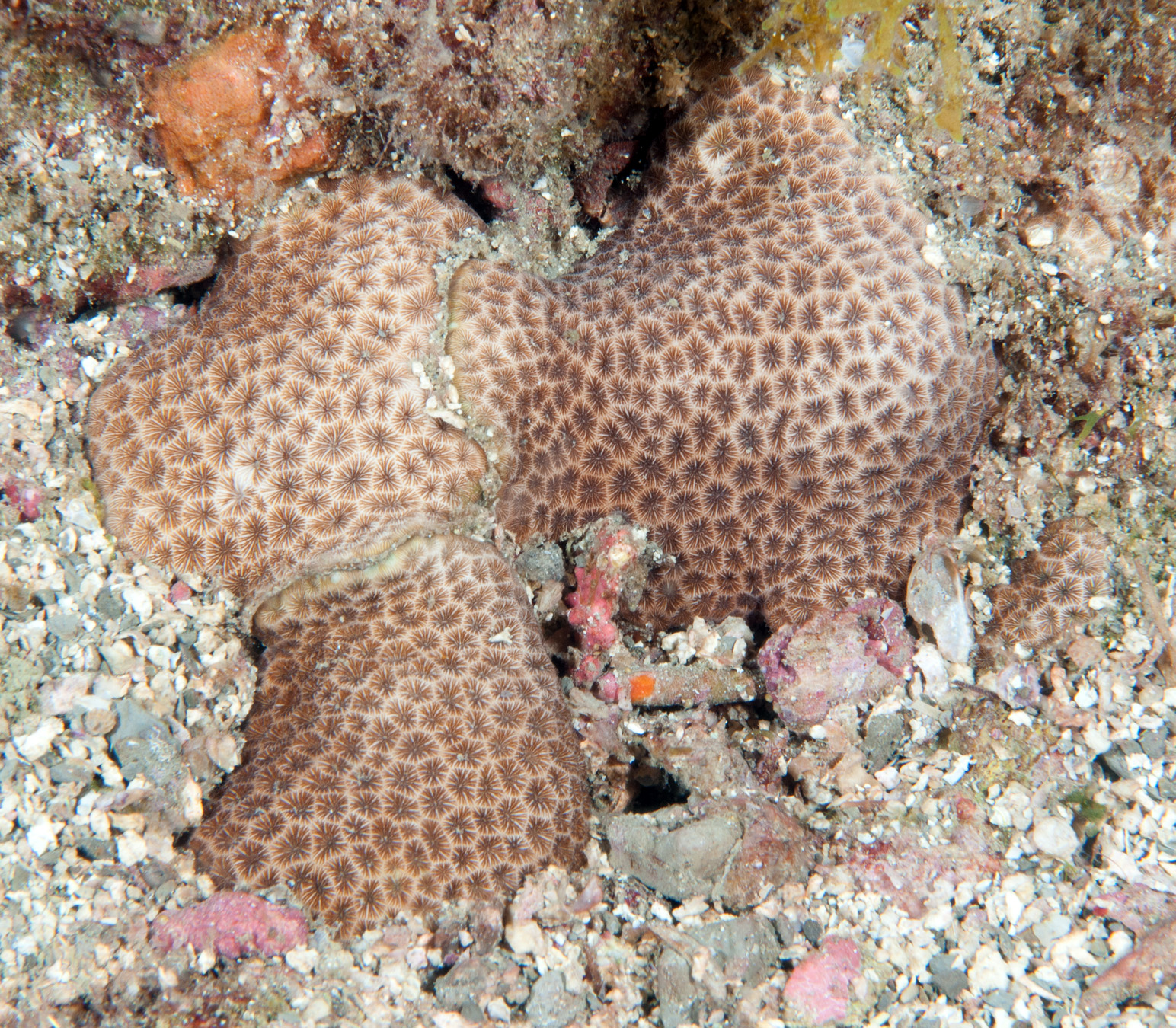

Conservation status
- Least Concern (IUCN 3.1)

Scientific classification
- Kingdom: Animalia
- Phylum: Cnidaria
- Subphylum: Anthozoa
- Class: Hexacorallia
- Order: Scleractinia
- Family: Siderastreidae
- Genus: Siderastrea
- Species: S. radians

Binomial name
- Siderastrea radians (Pallas, 1766)

Synonyms
- Madrepora radians Pallas, 1766

= Siderastrea radians =

Species of coral

Siderastrea radians, also known as the lesser starlet coral or the shallow-water starlet coral, is a stony coral in the family Siderastreidae. It is found in shallow parts of the western Atlantic Ocean as small, solid mounds or encrusting sheets.

== Description ==
Siderastrea radians is either encrusting or grows in small, dimpled hummocks up to 30 centimetres (12 in) across but most colonies are much smaller than this. Occasionally it occurs as small calcareous pebbles that roll around in seagrass meadows or as loose flat discs in shallow rocky places. The corallites are not circular but are triangular or four-sided and deep, with 30 to 40 small ridges called septa. They have a dark interior that contrasts in colour with the pale surface of the coral which is greyish, greenish or light brown. The polyps are retracted back into these corallites during the day but emerge at night, extending their tentacles to feed. Each of these has a small knob of stinging cnidocytes at its tip. The lesser starlet coral can be confused with the closely related massive starlet coral (Siderastrea siderea) but that usually grows at greater depths, is larger and has less deep, more rounded corallites, each with 50 to 60 septa.

== Distribution and habitat ==
Siderastrea radians is common in tropical parts of the western Atlantic Ocean at depths of less than 25 metres (82 ft) but is most common in under 10 metres (33 ft) of water. Its range extends from Bermuda, the Bahamas, Florida and the Caribbean Sea south to Brazil and it also occurs in the eastern Atlantic off the coast of Africa. It is found on rocks in various reef habitats and can tolerate silty environments and tide pools. It is an adaptable species and in the Indian River Lagoon it has been found to tolerate temperatures varying between 13 °C (55 °F) and 31 °C (88 °F) and a wide range of salinities.

== Biology ==
Siderastrea radians feeds at night on zooplankton which it catches with its tentacles. During the day it benefits from the symbiotic zooxanthellae that are found in the tissues. These unicellular algae live within the host's cells and produce carbohydrates by photosynthesis and the coral makes use of these.

The sexes are separate in the lesser starlet coral. Each of the twenty-eight ovaries in a female polyp produces a flattened oval egg. Spawning takes place all through the year but may be related to the phase of the moon. Well developed planula larvae have been found being brooded inside female polyps shortly before the full moon.

Growth rates of the lesser starlet coral are low but, because of its great tolerance to an increase in sediment levels and to elevated temperatures, it is an important species for maintaining and restoring damaged reefs and may be useful for this purpose if sea temperatures continue to rise.
