= Antheacheridae =

Scientific classification
- Domain: Eukaryota
- Kingdom: Animalia
- Phylum: Arthropoda
- Class: Copepoda
- Order: Cyclopoida
- Suborder: Ergasilida
- Family: Antheacheridae

Family of crustaceans

Antheacheridae is a family of cyclopoid copepods in the order Cyclopoida. There are at least four genera and about seven described species in Antheacheridae.

== Genera ==
These four genera belong to the family Antheacheridae:

- Antheacheres Sars M., 1857
- Coelotrophus Ho, Katsumi & Honma, 1981
- Gastroecus Hansen, 1886
- Staurosoma Will, 1844
