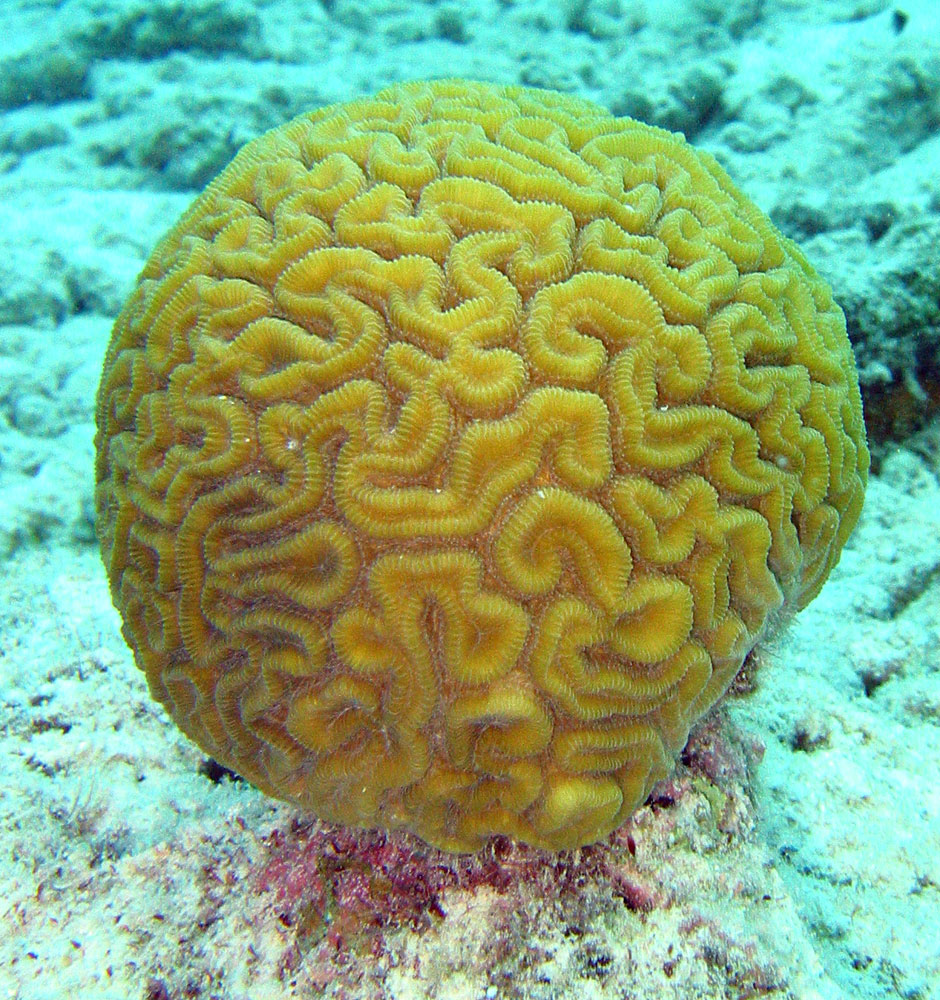

Conservation status
- Critically Endangered (IUCN 3.1)

- Apparently Secure (NatureServe)

Scientific classification
- Kingdom: Animalia
- Phylum: Cnidaria
- Subphylum: Anthozoa
- Class: Hexacorallia
- Order: Scleractinia
- Family: Mussidae
- Genus: Diploria; Milne-Edwards and Haime, 1848
- Species: D. labyrinthiformis

Binomial name
- Diploria labyrinthiformis (Linnaeus, 1758)

Synonyms
- List (Species): Coeloria labyrinthiformis (Linnaeus, 1758); Diploria cerebreformis (Lamarck, 1816); Madrepora labyrinthiformis Linnaeus, 1758; Maeandrina labyrinthiformis (Linnaeus, 1758); Maeandrina sinuosa Le Sueur, 1820; Meandrina cerebriformis Lamarck, 1816

= Diploria =

Genus of corals

Diploria is a monotypic genus of massive reef building stony corals in the family Mussidae. It is represented by a single species, Diploria labyrinthiformis, commonly known as grooved brain coral, and is found in the western Atlantic Ocean and Caribbean Sea. It has a familiar, maze-like appearance.

== Description ==
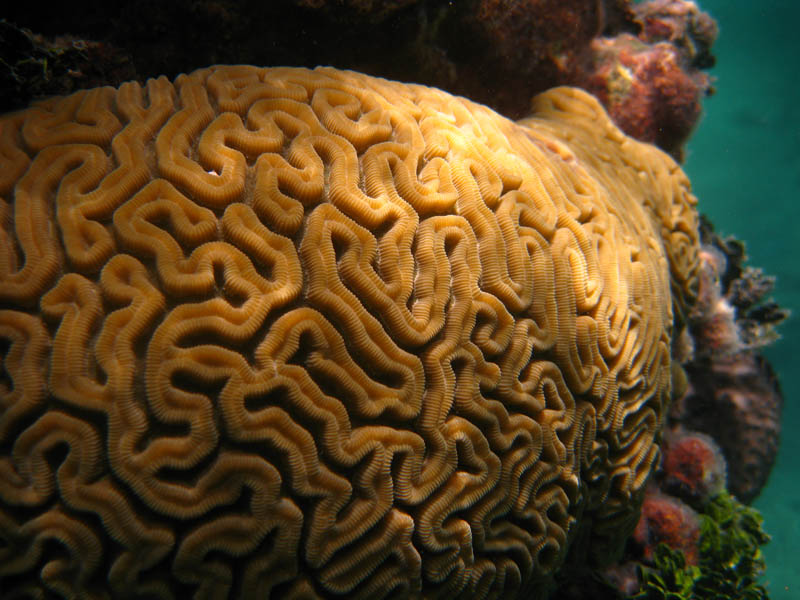
Grooved brain coral, Caribbean Sea, Vieques, Puerto Rico

This species of reef-building coral has a hemispherical, brain-like shape with a brown, yellow, or grey colour. It has characteristic deep, interconnected double-valleys. These polyp-bearing valleys are each separated by grooved ambulacral ridges. There may be a difference in colour between the valleys and the grooves.

Diploria labyrinthiformis can grow upward at a rate of approximately 3.5 millimeters per year, achieving about 2 metres (6.6 feet) in diameter. During its planktonic larval stage, the coral has locomotion. After that time, it becomes permanently sessile.

This species is a suspension feeder, and survives mainly on zooplankton and bacteria. These are captured by the polyps, by extruding mesenterial filaments and tentacles. The polyps have nematocysts which are triggered to hold their prey immobile. The prey is then transported to the mouth with the assistance of mucus and cilia.

Diploria labyrinthiformis is hermaphroditic, and reproduces through broadcast spawning. This entails eggs and sperm being released by adult colonies, followed by fertilization and the development of larvae at the water surface. Unlike most other Caribbean broadcast spawners, Diploria labyrinthiformis spawns over multiple months from the late spring until even mid-autumn.

== Distribution and habitat ==
Diploria labyrinthiformis is found in tropical parts of the west Atlantic Ocean, the Gulf of Mexico, the Caribbean Sea, the southern tip of Florida, the Bahamas, Bermuda and the coasts of Central America.

This coral occurs offshore at depths ranging from 1 to 30 metres (3.3 to 98.4 feet).

The Diploria coral is important to its environment because it helps researchers see how the oceans temperature has changed over time by looking at the layers in the coral skeleton.

== Status ==
This species was listed as Least Concern for years on the IUCN Red List. However, the most recent assessment in 2021 has resulted in a sudden uplisting due to the species' predicted decline, in part due to its susceptibility to stony coral tissue loss disease.

== Relationships with other species ==
=== Symbiotic ===
Diploria labyrinthiformis hosts Zooxanthella, a symbiotic dinoflagellate alga. The alga benefits from being in a protective environment in an elevated position. The coral benefits from the nutrients produced photosynthetically by the alga which provides part of its needs for growth and calcification.

The coral also has a relationship with Diadema antillarum, the long-spined urchin, whose grazing helps to reduce the effects of shading, as well as the overgrowth of macroalgae.

=== Predators ===
Despite the polyps being equipped with nematocysts, various species prey upon Diploria labyrinthiformis. These include:

- Gastropods
- Polychaetes (annelid worms)
- Sea urchins
- Starfishes
- Sea spiders
- Parrotfish and other fishes

=== Parasites ===
This species is host to a parasite in the Corallovexiidae family:

- Corallovexia brevibrachium is both an ectoparasite and an endoparasite.

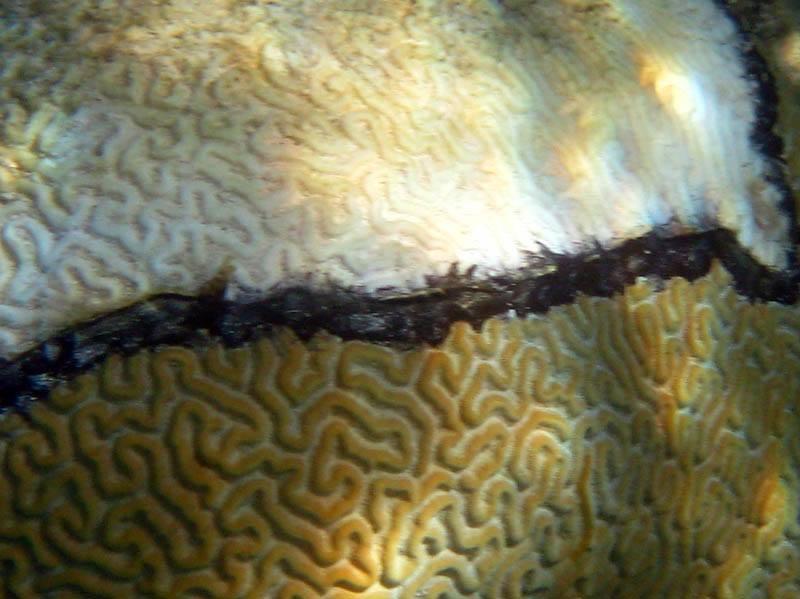
Grooved brain coral with black band disease in Caribbean Sea, Bahia de la Chiva, Puerto Rico

== Taxonomy ==
Diploria labyrinthiformis is the only member of its genus. In the past, other species were classified as belonging to Diploria. Two of these species, Pseudodiploria strigosa and Pseudodiploria clivosa, were transferred to the genus Pseudodiploria in 2012.

== Reproduction ==
Diploria labyrinthiformis is hermaphroditic, employing a broadcast-spawning method to reproduce. As with most coral species, timing of gamete release is related to moon cycles. Exact timing of this event can vary, even within its regional range, but is typically earlier in the year than many other scleractinian species in the Caribbean

== Postage stamps ==
Images of Diploria labyrinthiformis appear on three postage stamps: a 75 cent Belizean stamp created by Georges Declercq, a 15 cent stamp from United States issued 1980-08-26 and a 54 Euro cent stamp from Mayotte.

== See also ==
- Brain coral
- Colpophyllia natans (large-grooved brain coral)
