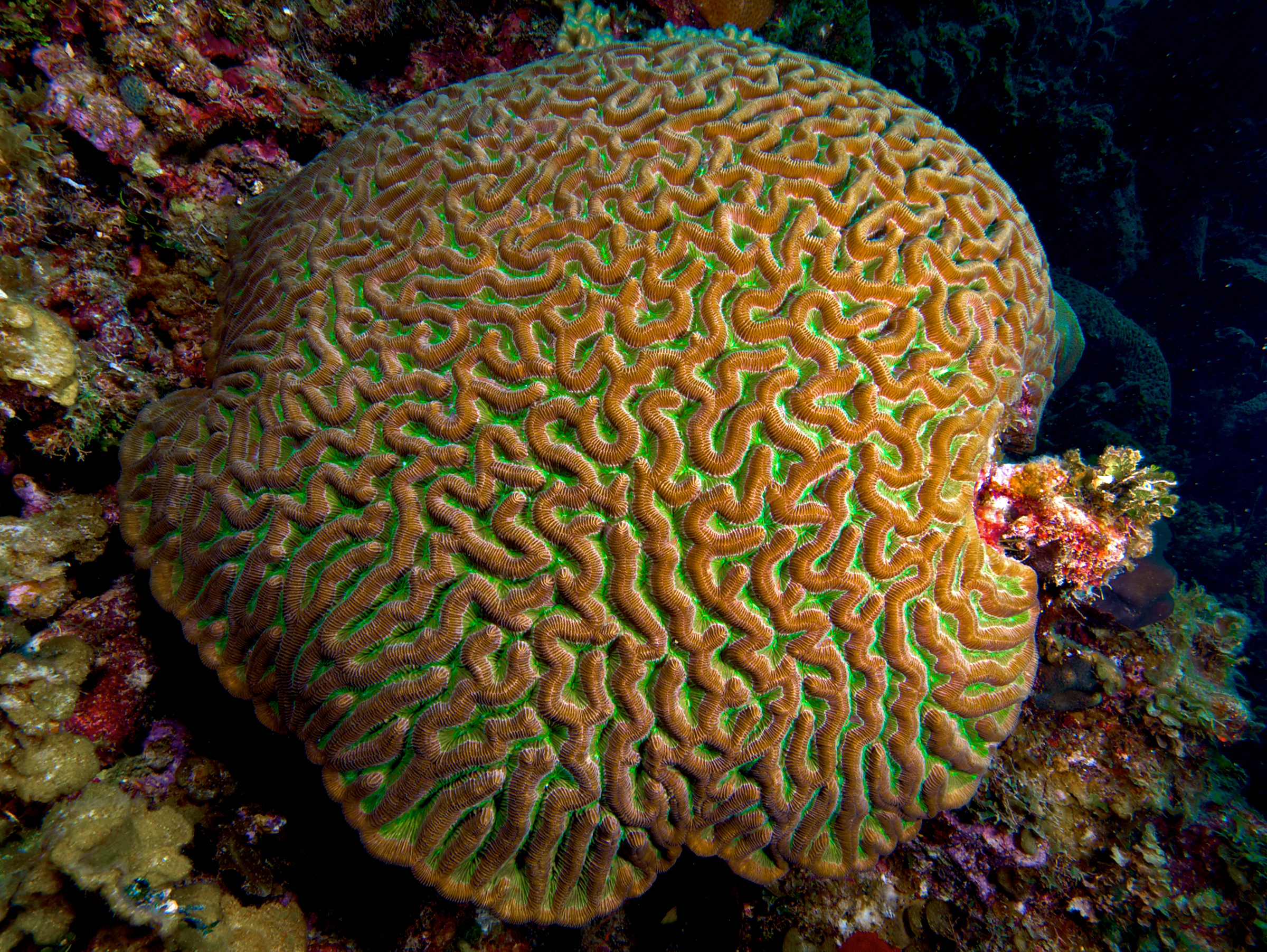
- Along the northern coast of Haiti

Conservation status
- Vulnerable (IUCN 3.1)

- Apparently Secure (NatureServe)

Scientific classification
- Kingdom: Animalia
- Phylum: Cnidaria
- Subphylum: Anthozoa
- Class: Hexacorallia
- Order: Scleractinia
- Family: Mussidae
- Genus: Colpophyllia; Milne-Edwards and Haime, 1848
- Species: C. natans

Binomial name
- Colpophyllia natans (Houttuyn, 1772)

Synonyms
- List (Species): Colpophyllia amaranthus (Houttuyn, 1772); Colpophyllia breviserialis Milne Edwards & Haime, 1849; Colpophyllia gyrosa (Ellis & Solander, 1786); Madrepora gyrosa Ellis & Solander, 1786; Madrepora natans Houttuyn, 1772; Meandrina gyrosa (Ellis & Solander, 1786)

= Colpophyllia =

Genus of corals

Colpophyllia is a genus of stony corals in the family Mussidae. It is monotypic with a single species, Colpophyllia natans, commonly known as boulder brain coral or large-grooved brain coral. It inhabits the slopes and tops of reefs, to a maximum depth of 50 metres (164 ft). It is characterised by large, domed colonies, which may be up to 2 metres (6 ft 7 in) across, and by the meandering network of ridges and valleys on its surface. The ridges are usually brown with a single groove, and the valleys may be tan, green, or white and are uniform in width, typically 2 centimetres (0.8 in). The polyps only extend their tentacles at night.

== Description ==
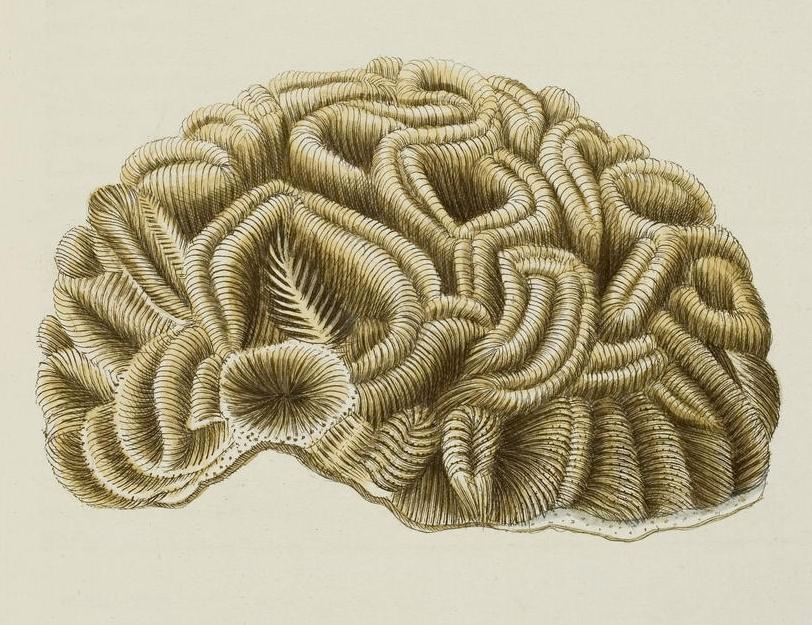
An illustration of a Colpophyllia natans colony.

Individual colonies of Colpophyllia natans are large and usually broadly domed, with curvature typically increasing with the size, and therefore age, of the colony. They grow up to 2 metres (6 ft 7 in) in diameter and morphologically earn the epithet "boulder." Colony shape may occasionally be flat-topped discs, particularly when younger. As a type of brain coral, the surface of the skeleton is a network of winding, curving valleys and ridges (or walls) that roughly resemble the familiar folding architecture of the mammal cerebrum.

The colour of the ridges and valleys vary among colonies, with the ridges being various shades of brown, and the valleys either whitish, green, or tan. The ridge tops are indented with a single thin groove. Ridges and valleys may be up to 2 centimetres (0.8 in) wide, and this breadth distinguishes it from the narrower Diploria, which may otherwise be similar in appearance. The polyps only extend their tentacles at night.

The robust shape, size, and slow growth of the boulder brain coral allows it more easily to survive conditions to which smaller and more fragile corals, such as the plate-like lettuce coral (Agaricia agaricites), succumb. C. natans and the sympatric and similarly named boulder star coral (Montastraea annularis) are less likely to be smothered by algal bloom, and have also weathered reef-wrecking Hurricane Allen off the coast of Jamaica in 1980. Corals in the Caribbean are susceptible to bleaching caused by high water temperatures and solar radiation. A nine-month study conducted in 2005 compared the mortality of C. natans from bleaching to that of Porites porites, which has a finger-like morphology. Although the severity of bleaching between the two species was similar, 56% of the P. porites colonies studied died from the bleaching, compared to only 8% mortality for bleach-affected C. natans. However, bleaching induced widespread incidence of the coral syndrome White Plague Type II, resulting in bleaching-related mortality of 42% among C. natans over 9 months, nearly as high as that for P. porites.

== Distribution and habitat ==
Boulder brain corals inhabit coral reefs in the Caribbean Sea and the Gulf of Mexico, with most occurrences off the coasts of Belize, eastern Yucatán Peninsula, southern Florida, Puerto Rico, the Virgin Islands and Cuba. It is identifiable in fossil records at least since the early Pliocene.

Colpophyllia natans is considered one of the dominant reef-building corals of the Caribbean region and is a familiar species of the shallower reef ledges and slopes. It can be found down to a depth of fifty metres, but is more often established closer to the surface.

== Lifecycle ==
Colpophyllia natans is a hermaphroditic broadcast spawner, releasing large numbers of gametes synchronously to aid fertilisation. Each individual polyp spawns both eggs and sperm, having the reproductive capabilities of both the male and female sexes. Following fertilisation, the zygote becomes a microscopic larva called a planula, which, upon swimming to suitable substrate, will anchor and establish a new colony. This method of sexual reproduction has a high rate of failure in several of its stages and few new colonies successfully grow.

Colpophyllia natans is susceptible to more coral diseases than most other corals in its habitat. A total of seven diseases are known to afflict C. natans, and it is one of only twenty-two coral species worldwide in which this count is higher than three. It is one of the Caribbean corals most afflicted by black band disease, and along with Montastraea spp., suffers from yellow-band disease. A particularly aggressive form of white plague known as WPL III has so far been documented attacking only very large colonies of C. natans and Montastraea annularis. Other hosted diseases include white plague types I and II, dark spot, and skeletal anomalies, such as tumours and galls. Another pathogen, so far unidentified, killed in one year, between 2001 and 2002, approximately half of the corals present in Bird Key Reef of the Dry Tortugas.

Despite this susceptibility to disease, the boulder brain coral is long-lived, with specimens capable of living for more than two hundred years.

== Taxonomy ==
The first description of Colpophyllia natans as a species was published by the Dutch physician and naturalist Maarten Houttuyn. Basing his work on Linnaeus, between the years 1761 and 1785 Houttuyn published a 37-volume natural history series, titled Natuurlyke historie, of Uitvoerige beschryving der dieren, planten, en mineraalen, volgens het samenstel van den Heer Linnæus. Met naauwkeurige afbeeldingen ("Natural history, or an extensive description of the animals, plants and minerals, after the compilation of Linnaeus, with accurate illustrations"). Volumes 17 and 18, the final volumes of the zoology section, were published in 1772 and focused on polyps, wherein C. natans is described. Houttuyn gave the species name as Madrepora natans, which was later included in the genus Colpophyllia, by Henri Milne-Edwards and Jules Haime, 1848. His cousin Frans Houttuyn, a printer and bookseller, printed the series and is sometimes mistakenly credited for the work and also erroneously named as Houttuyn's father.

A synonym of C. natans is Meandrina gyrosa, attributed to Lamarck, 1816. There is dispute over whether or not Colpophyllia breviserialis is the same species.
