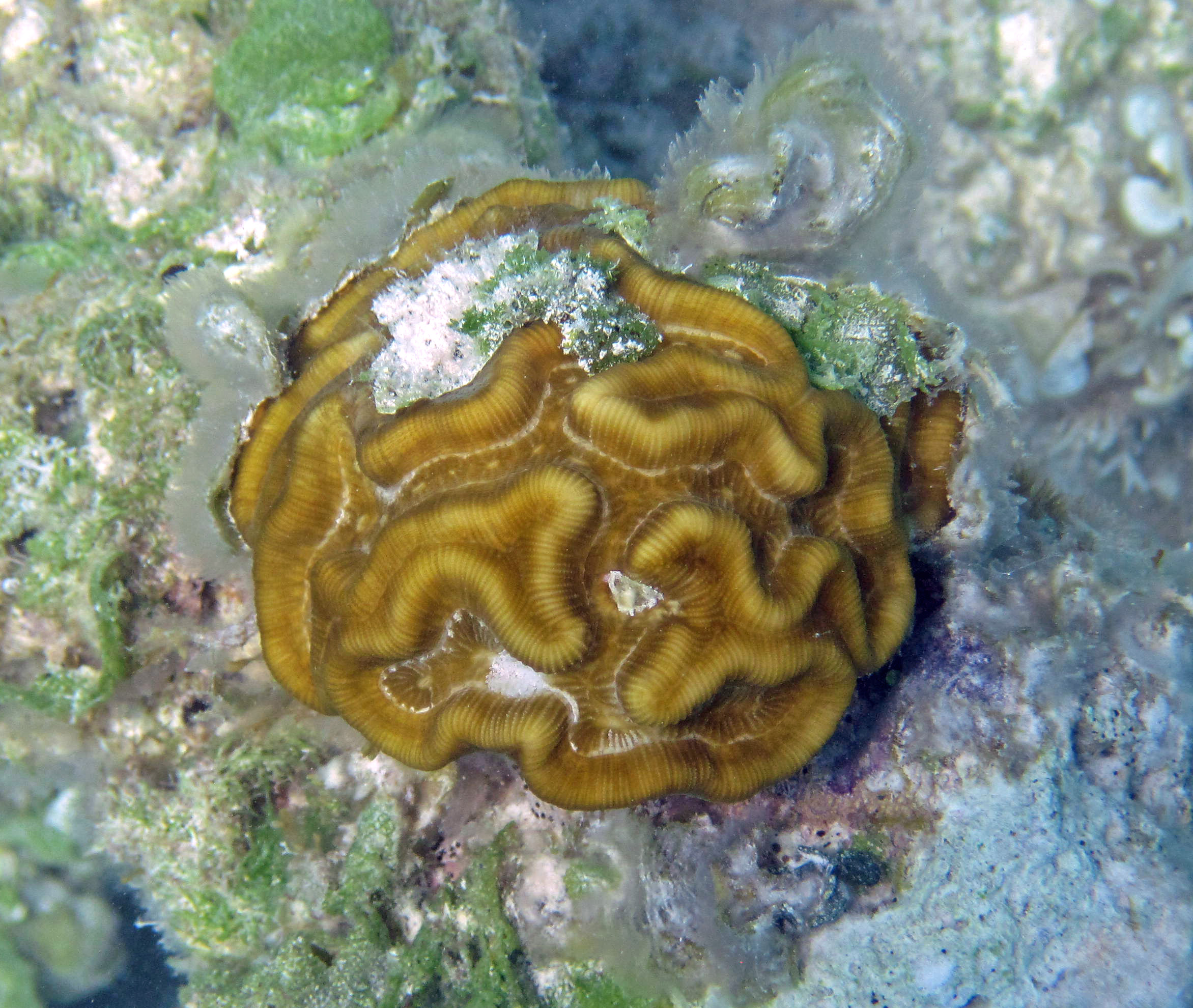
- Manicina areolata near San Salvador Island, Bahamas

Scientific classification
- Kingdom: Animalia
- Phylum: Cnidaria
- Subphylum: Anthozoa
- Class: Hexacorallia
- Order: Scleractinia
- Family: Mussidae
- Genus: Manicina; Ehrenberg, 1834

Species
- See text

Synonyms
- Teleiophyllia Duncan, 1864

= Manicina =

Genus of corals

Manicina is a genus of reef-building stony corals in the family Mussidae.

== Species ==
The following species are included in the genus according to the World Register of Marine Species:

- Manicina areolata (Linnaeus, 1758)
- †Manicina grandis (Duncan, 1864)
- †Manicina navicula (Duncan, 1864)
