= Erythrastrea =

Scientific classification
- Domain: Eukaryota
- Kingdom: Animalia
- Phylum: Cnidaria
- Class: Hexacorallia
- Order: Scleractinia
- Family: Faviidae
- Genus: Erythrastrea; Pichon, Scheer & Pillai, 1983

Genus of corals

Erythrastrea is a genus of cnidarians belonging to the family Faviidae.

Species:

- Erythrastrea flabellata Pichon, Scheer & Pillai, 1983
- Erythrastrea wellsi (Ma, 1959)
