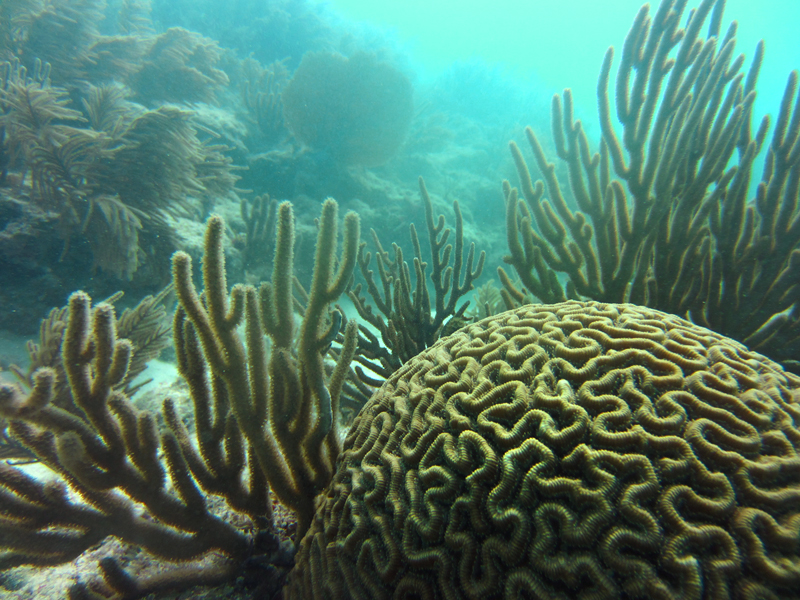

Conservation status
- Critically Endangered (IUCN 3.1)

- Secure (NatureServe)

Scientific classification
- Kingdom: Animalia
- Phylum: Cnidaria
- Subphylum: Anthozoa
- Class: Hexacorallia
- Order: Scleractinia
- Family: Mussidae
- Genus: Pseudodiploria
- Species: P. strigosa

Binomial name
- Pseudodiploria strigosa (Dana, 1846)

Synonyms
- List: Coeloria strigosa (Dana, 1846); Diploria strigosa (Dana, 1846); Maeandrina strigosa Dana, 1846 [lapsus]; Meandrina strigosa Dana, 1846

= Pseudodiploria strigosa =

Species of coral

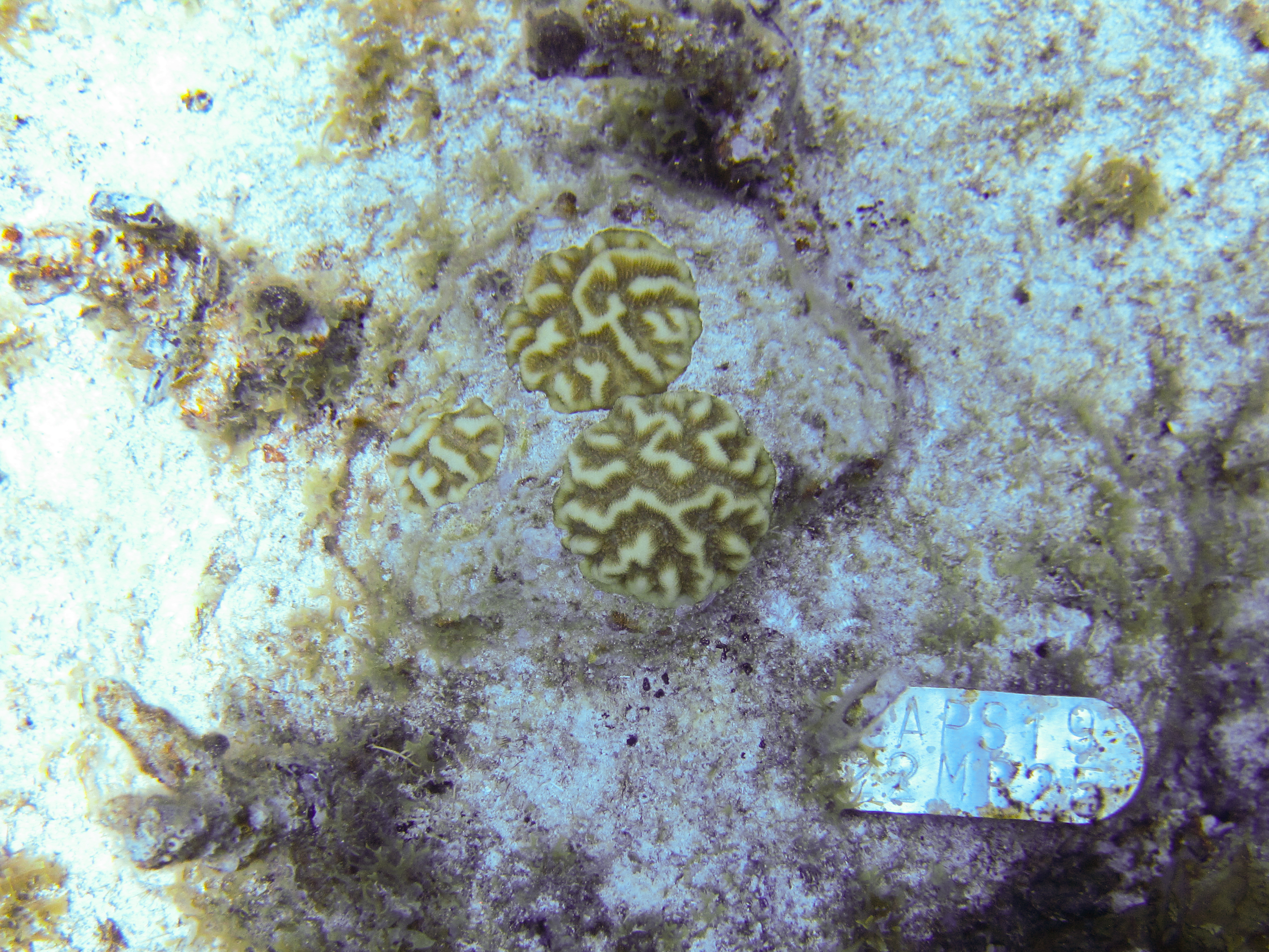
Young coral (Pseudodiploria Strigosa) outplanted and tagged in the Florida Keys National Marine Sanctuary

Pseudodiploria strigosa, the symmetrical brain coral, is a colonial species of stony coral in the family Mussidae. It occurs on reefs in shallow water in the West Atlantic Ocean and Caribbean Sea. It grows slowly and lives to a great age.

== Description ==
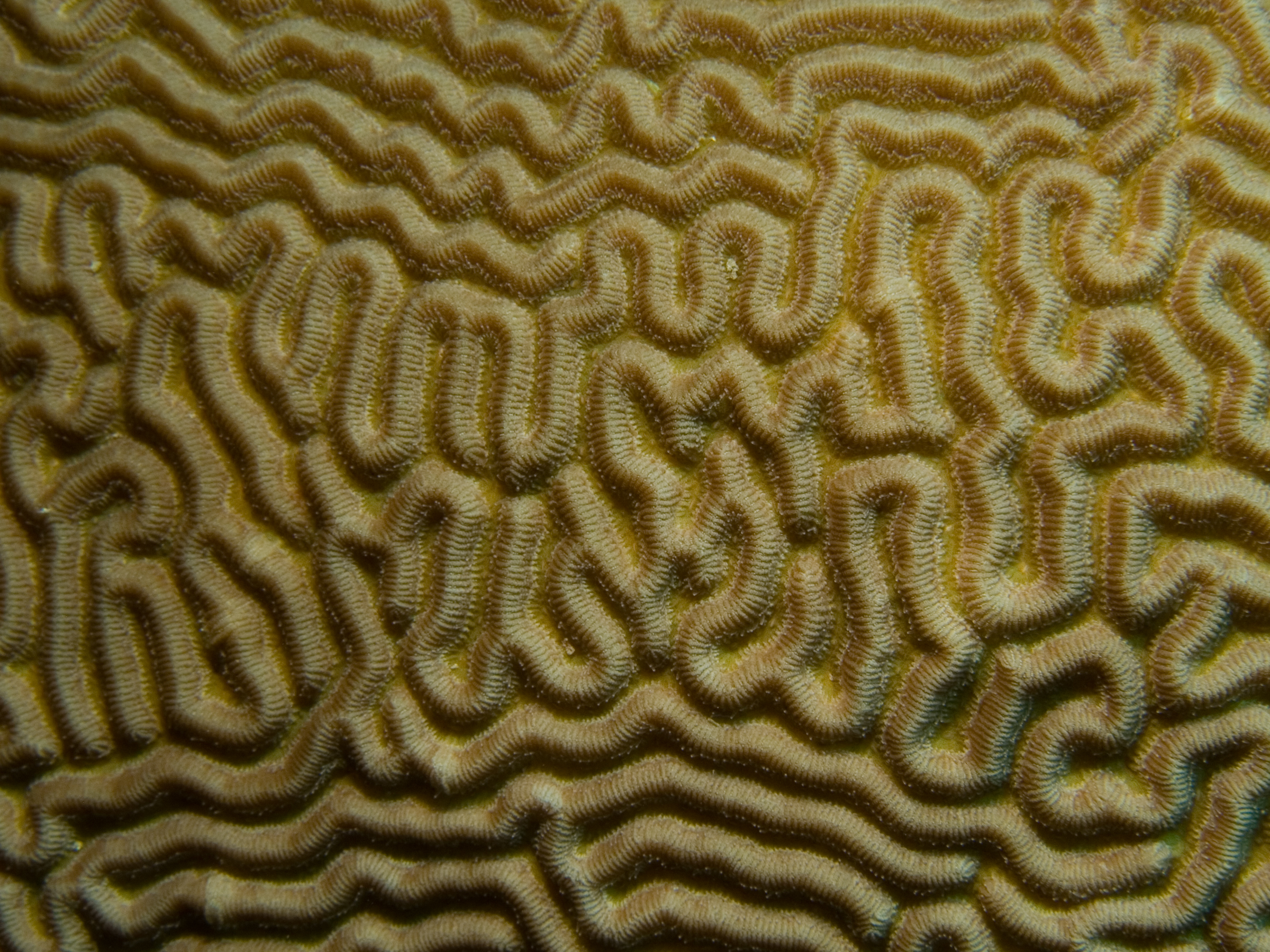
Close up view of ridges and valleys on the surface of the coral

The symmetrical brain coral forms smooth flat plates or massive hemispherical domes up to 1.8 metres (5 ft 11 in) in diameter. The surface is covered with interlinking convoluted valleys in which the polyps sit in cup-shaped depressions known as corallites. Each of these has a number of radially arranged ridges known as septa which continue outside the corallite as costae and link with those of neighbouring corallites. The ridges separating the valleys are smoothly rounded and do not usually have a groove running along their apex as does the rather similar grooved brain coral (Diploria labyrinthiformis). The coral has symbiotic dinoflagellate alga called zooxanthella in its tissues and it is these which give the coral its colour of yellowish or greenish brown, or occasionally blue-grey. The valleys are often a paler or contrasting colour.

== Distribution and habitat ==
The symmetrical brain coral grows in shallow parts of the Caribbean Sea, the Bahamas, Bermuda, Florida and Texas. It is probably the most widespread of the brain corals and not only occurs on reefs but also sometimes on muddy stretches of seabed where not many other corals flourish. It grows at depths down to about 40 metres (130 ft).

The fossilised remains of Pseudodiploria strigosa have been found alongside those of other massive corals, Pseudodiploria clivosa, Siderastrea siderea and Solenastrea bouroni, in marine deposits in Río Grande de Manatí, Puerto Rico that date back to the Pleistocene.

== Biology ==
The symmetrical brain coral grows very slowly adding about 1 centimetre (0.39 in) to its diameter in a year. This means that a large specimen over a metre (yard) across is at least a century old. In the day time the polyps retract inside their corallites but at night they extend their ring of tentacles and feed on zooplankton. The coral also benefits from the photosynthetic products produced by the zooxanthellae.
