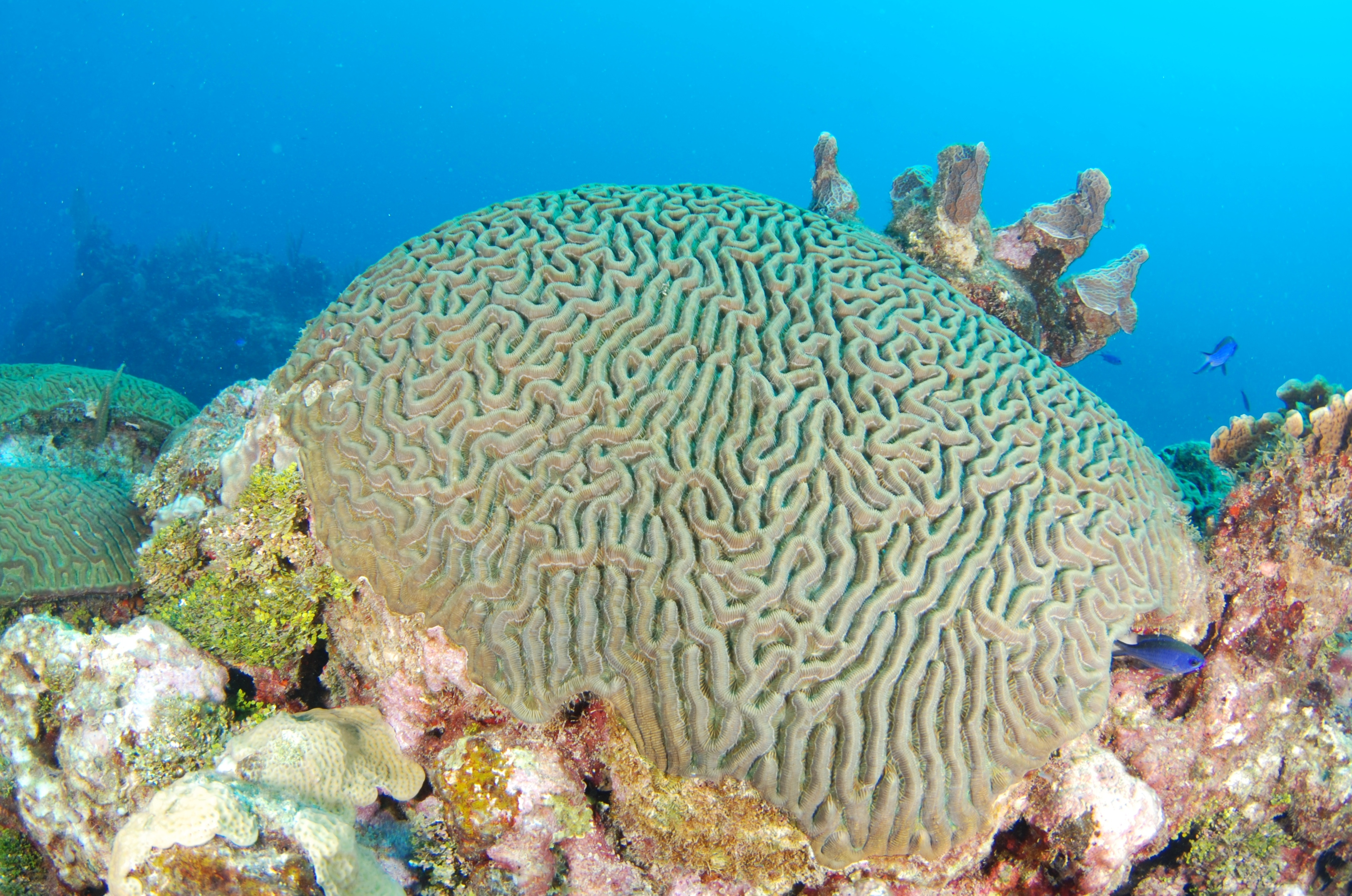
- Pseudodiploria strigosa

Scientific classification
- Kingdom: Animalia
- Phylum: Cnidaria
- Subphylum: Anthozoa
- Class: Hexacorallia
- Order: Scleractinia
- Family: Mussidae
- Genus: Pseudodiploria; Fukami, Budd & Knowlton, 2012

Species
- See text

= Pseudodiploria =

Genus of corals

Pseudodiploria is a genus of stony corals in the subfamily Faviinae of the family Mussidae. This genus was erected in 2012, having been split off from the genus Diploria. This genus is found in the tropical and subtropical West Atlantic Ocean and the Caribbean Sea.

== Characteristics ==
Pseudodiploria is a colonial coral. Budding is always intracalicular, occurring inside the oral disc of the polyp, within the whorl of tentacles. The corallites are meandroid, with a number of centres being linked serially, separated by valleys some 4 to 15 mm (0.2 to 0.6 in) wide. There is a continuous, trabecular columella but hardly any coenosteum. The septal teeth are three-pointed and are orientated transversely to the septal plane.

== Species ==
The World Register of Marine Species lists the following two species :

- Pseudodiploria clivosa (Ellis & Solander, 1786)
- Pseudodiploria strigosa (Dana, 1846)
