= Xarifiidae =

Scientific classification
- Domain: Eukaryota
- Kingdom: Animalia
- Phylum: Arthropoda
- Class: Copepoda
- Order: Cyclopoida
- Suborder: Ergasilida
- Family: Xarifiidae

Family of crustaceans

Xarifiidae is a family of cyclopoid copepods in the order Cyclopoida. There are about 5 genera and more than 90 described species in Xarifiidae.

== Genera ==
These five genera belong to the family Xarifiidae:

- Botegokika Ho, Cheng & Dai, 2013
- Lipochrus Humes & Dojiri, 1982
- Orstomella H.o.Humes, 1968
- Xarifia Humes, 1960
- Zazaranus Humes & Dojiri, 1983
