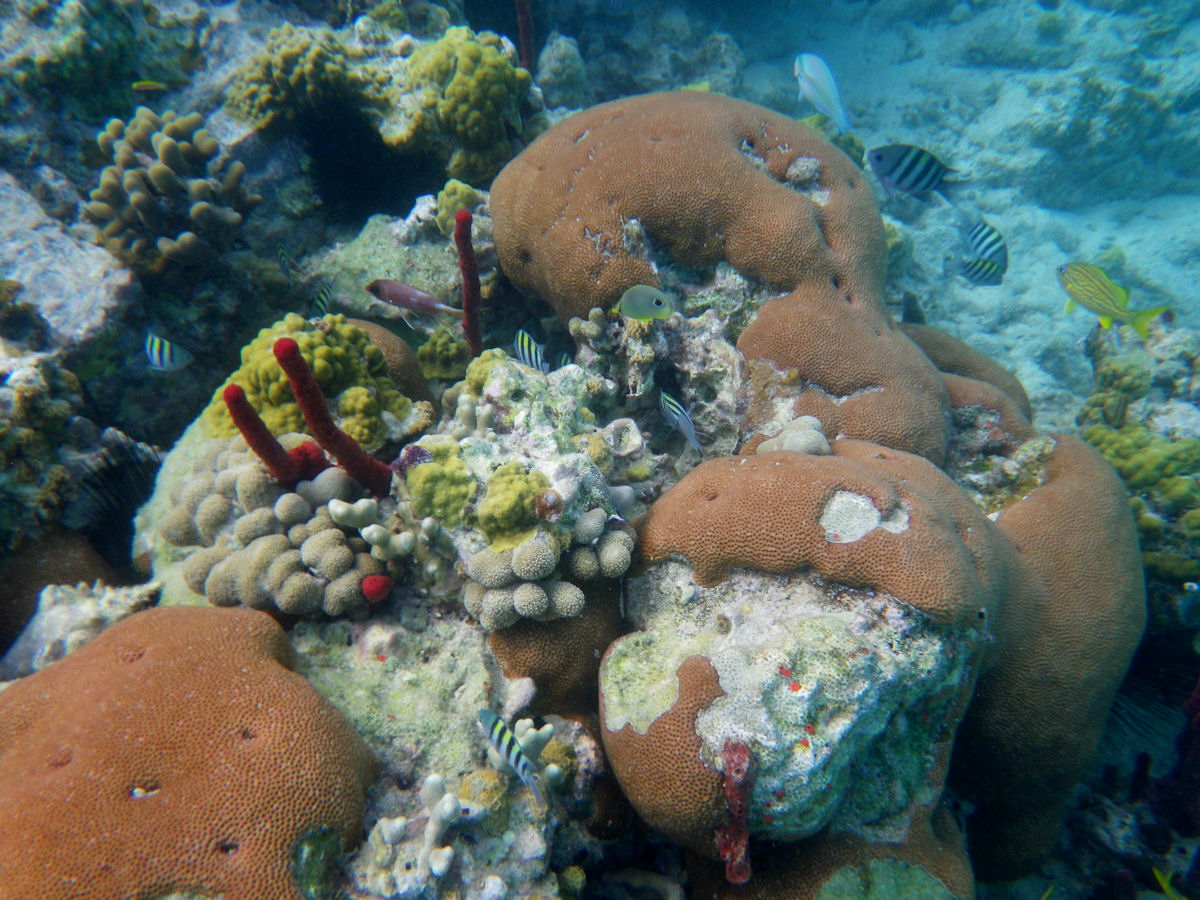
- Massive Starlet Corals (Siderastrea siderea)

Scientific classification
- Kingdom: Animalia
- Phylum: Cnidaria
- Subphylum: Anthozoa
- Class: Hexacorallia
- Order: Scleractinia
- Family: Siderastreidae; Vaughan & Wells, 1943

Genera
- See text

= Siderastreidae =

Family of corals

Siderastreidae is a family of reef building stony corals. Members of the family include symbiotic algae called Zooxanthellae in their tissues which help provide their energy requirements.

== Description ==
Members of this family are colonial, hermatypic (reef-building) corals. The corals vary in form and include massive, thickly encrusting, columnar, and irregular forms. The corallites are linked by flowing septa that have granular margins and that are fused in the centre to give fan-shaped or star-shaped groupings. The corallites do not project from the surface of the coral and have ill-defined walls formed from thickened septa.

== Genera ==
The World Register of Marine Species includes the following genera in the family:

- †Pironastraea d'Achiardi, 1875
  - †Pironastraea indica Duncan, 1880
- Pseudosiderastrea Yabe & Sugiyama, 1935
  - Pseudosiderastrea formosa Pichon, Chuang & Chen, 2012
  - Pseudosiderastrea tayami Yabe & Sugiyama, 1935
- Siderastrea de Blainville, 1830 – starlet corals
  - †Siderastrea grandis Duncan, 1863
  - †Siderastrea radcliffi Faustino, 1931
  - Siderastrea radians (Pallas, 1766) – lesser starlet coral or shallow-water starlet coral
  - Siderastrea savignyana Milne Edwards & Haime, 1850
  - Siderastrea siderea (Ellis & Solander, 1768) – massive starlet coral or round starlet coral
  - Siderastrea stellata Verrill, 1868
