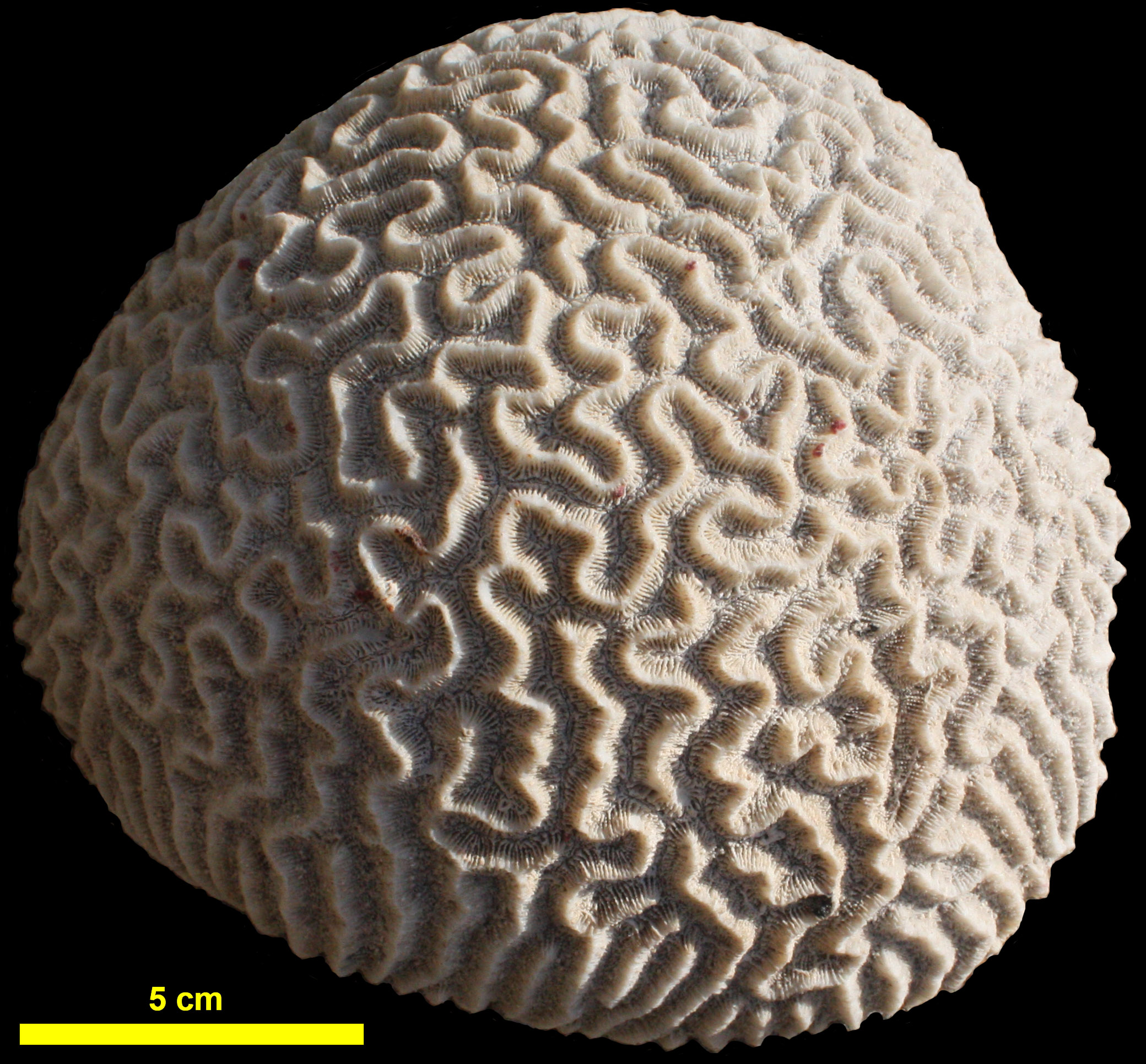

Conservation status
- Near Threatened (IUCN 3.1)

- Apparently Secure (NatureServe)

Scientific classification
- Kingdom: Animalia
- Phylum: Cnidaria
- Subphylum: Anthozoa
- Class: Hexacorallia
- Order: Scleractinia
- Family: Mussidae
- Genus: Pseudodiploria
- Species: P. clivosa

Binomial name
- Pseudodiploria clivosa (Ellis & Solander, 1786)

Synonyms
- List: Diploria clivosa (Ellis & Solander, 1786); Madrepora clivosa Ellis & Solander, 1786; Maeandrina clivosa (Ellis & Solander, 1786); Meandrina clivosa (Ellis & Solander, 1786)

= Pseudodiploria clivosa =

Species of coral

Pseudodiploria clivosa, the knobby brain coral, is a colonial species of stony coral in the family Mussidae. It occurs in shallow water in the West Atlantic Ocean and Caribbean Sea.

== Description ==
The knobby brain coral is a massive coral that either forms hemispherical domes or, particularly in areas of high wave action, forms plates and encrusts the seabed. It can grow to a diameter of about 1.3 metres (4 ft 3 in). The surface of the dome usually has a number of bulges or knobs but this species is not easy to distinguish from the symmetrical brain coral which tends to have a smoother outline. The surface consists of sharply delineated, convoluted ridges with valleys in between. There is no trough-like groove in the top of the ridge as is the case in the rather similar grooved brain coral (Diploria labyrinthiformis). The coral polyps are strung along the valley bottoms, each sitting in a little stony cup or corallite. The sides of these have minute walls called septa which come in four different sized cycles. They extend outside the corallites as costae that join one corallite to another but are discontinuous in this species, another distinguishing factor. The colour of the coral is usually some shade of yellowish or greenish brown and is caused by the presence of symbiotic dinoflagellates called zooxanthellae in the coral's tissues.

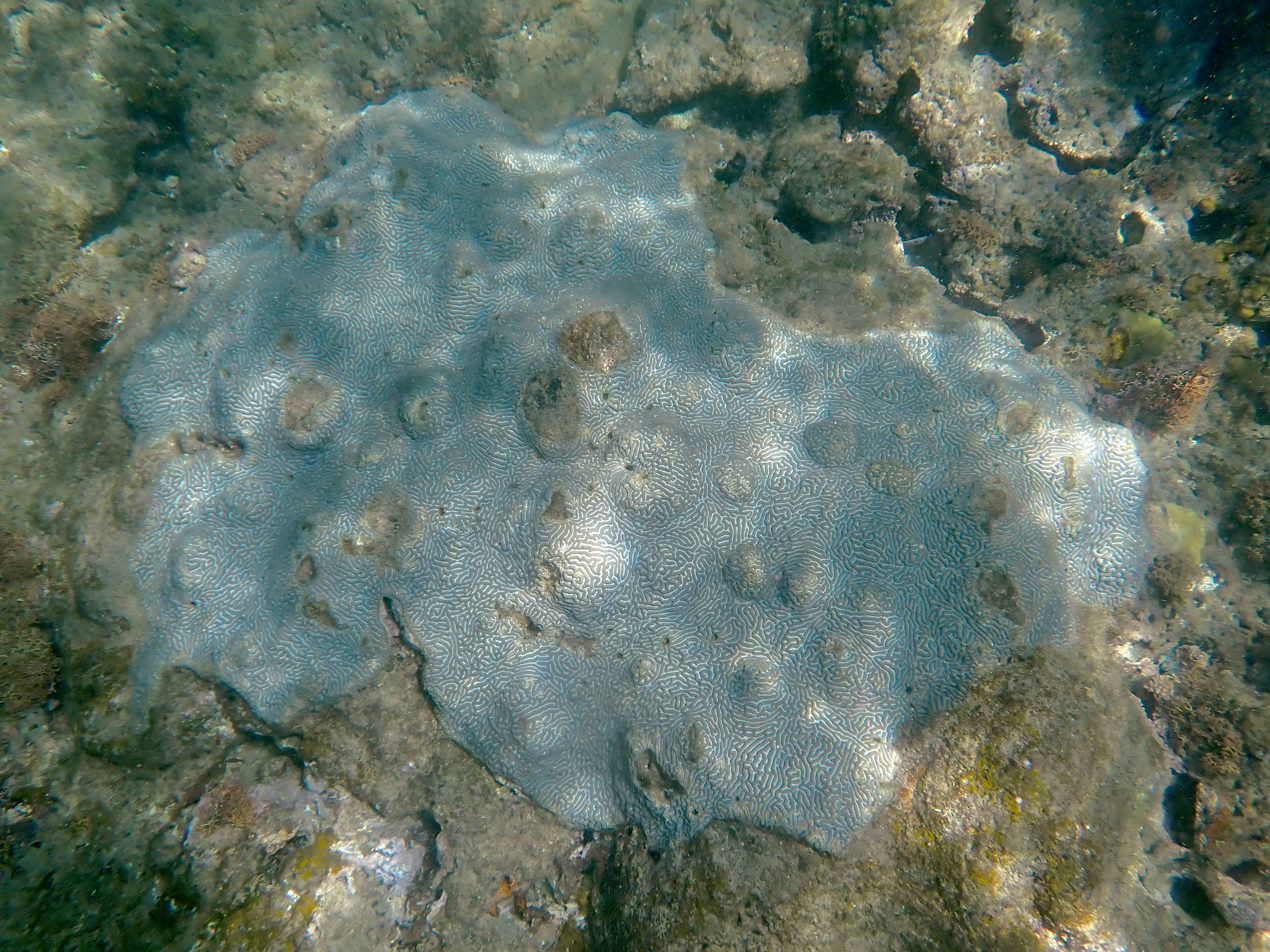
A large colony of knobby brain coral at Playa Tres Palmas, Rincón, Puerto Rico

== Distribution and habitat ==
The knobby brain coral is a common species and occurs in southern Florida, the Caribbean Sea and the Bahamas. It is found growing on reefs, in seagrass (Thalassia testudinum) meadows, in lagoons and sometimes on mangroves. It grows at depths down to about 40 metres (130 ft) but is most common at depths less than 5 metres (16 ft).

The fossilised remains of Pseudodiploria clivosa have been found alongside those of other massive corals Pseudodiploria strigosa, Siderastrea siderea and Solenastrea bouroni in marine deposits in Río Grande de Manatí, Puerto Rico that date back to the Pleistocene.

== Biology ==
During the day the polyps of the knobby brain coral are retracted into the corallites but at night they emerge and extend their tentacles to feed. The zooxanthellae are photosynthetic and up to fifty percent of their production is transferred to the host while they make use of the coral's nitrogenous waste.

The knobby brain coral grows by the budding of new polyps and the deposition of new calcareous material. Growth is very slow and large corals may be over a hundred years old. Sexual reproduction occurs by the release of gametes into the water column. The planula larvae drift with the currents before settling on the seabed and undergoing metamorphosis into polyps. These begin to secrete their own skeletons and found new colonies.
