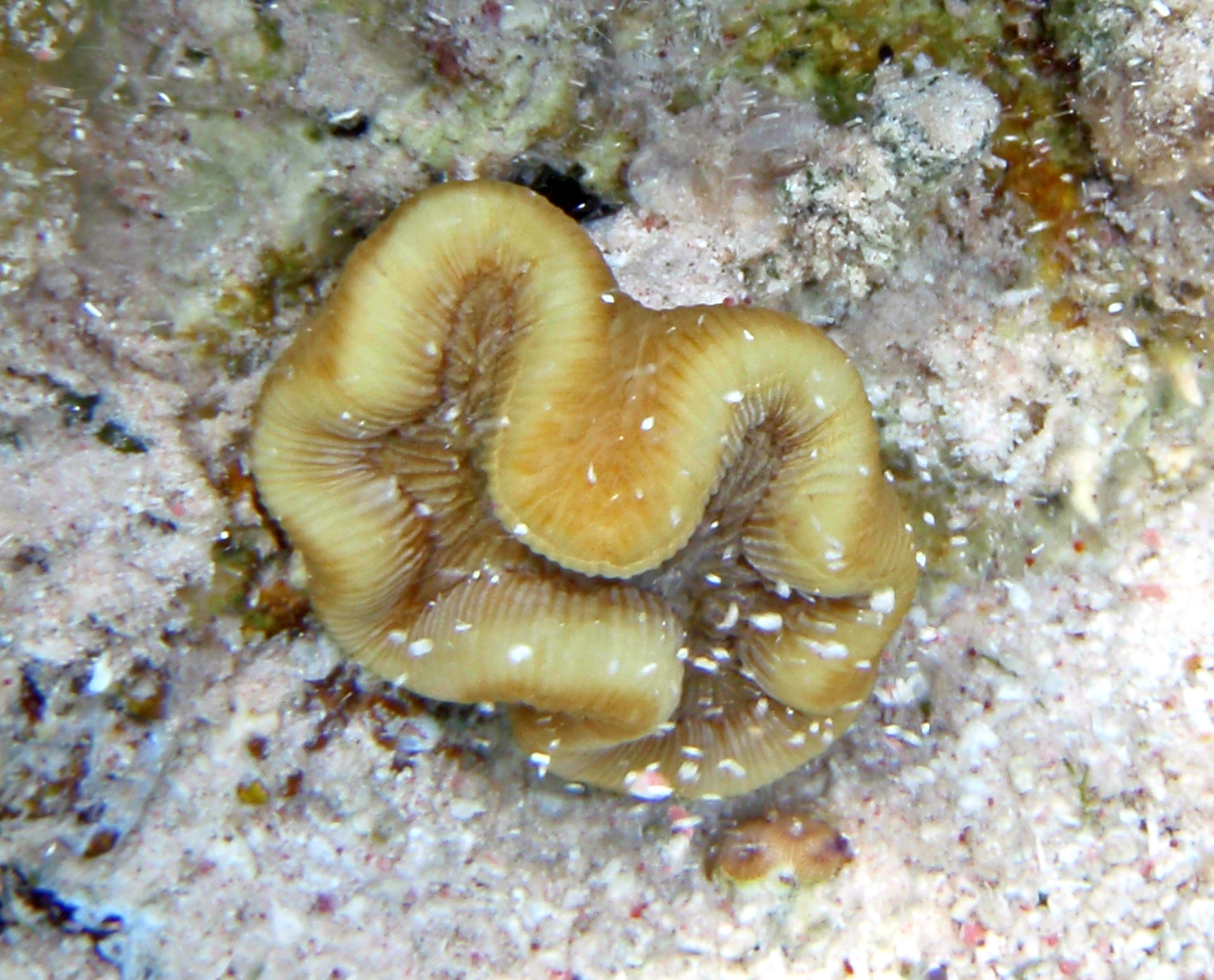

Conservation status
- Least Concern (IUCN 3.1)

Scientific classification
- Kingdom: Animalia
- Phylum: Cnidaria
- Subphylum: Anthozoa
- Class: Hexacorallia
- Order: Scleractinia
- Family: Mussidae
- Genus: Manicina
- Species: M. areolata

Binomial name
- Manicina areolata (Linnaeus, 1758)

Synonyms
- Madrepora areolata Linnaeus, 1758

= Manicina areolata =

Species of coral

Manicina areolata, commonly known as rose coral, is a colonial species of stony coral. It occurs in shallow water in the West Atlantic Ocean and Caribbean Sea, sometimes as small solid heads and sometimes as unattached cone-shaped forms.

== Description ==
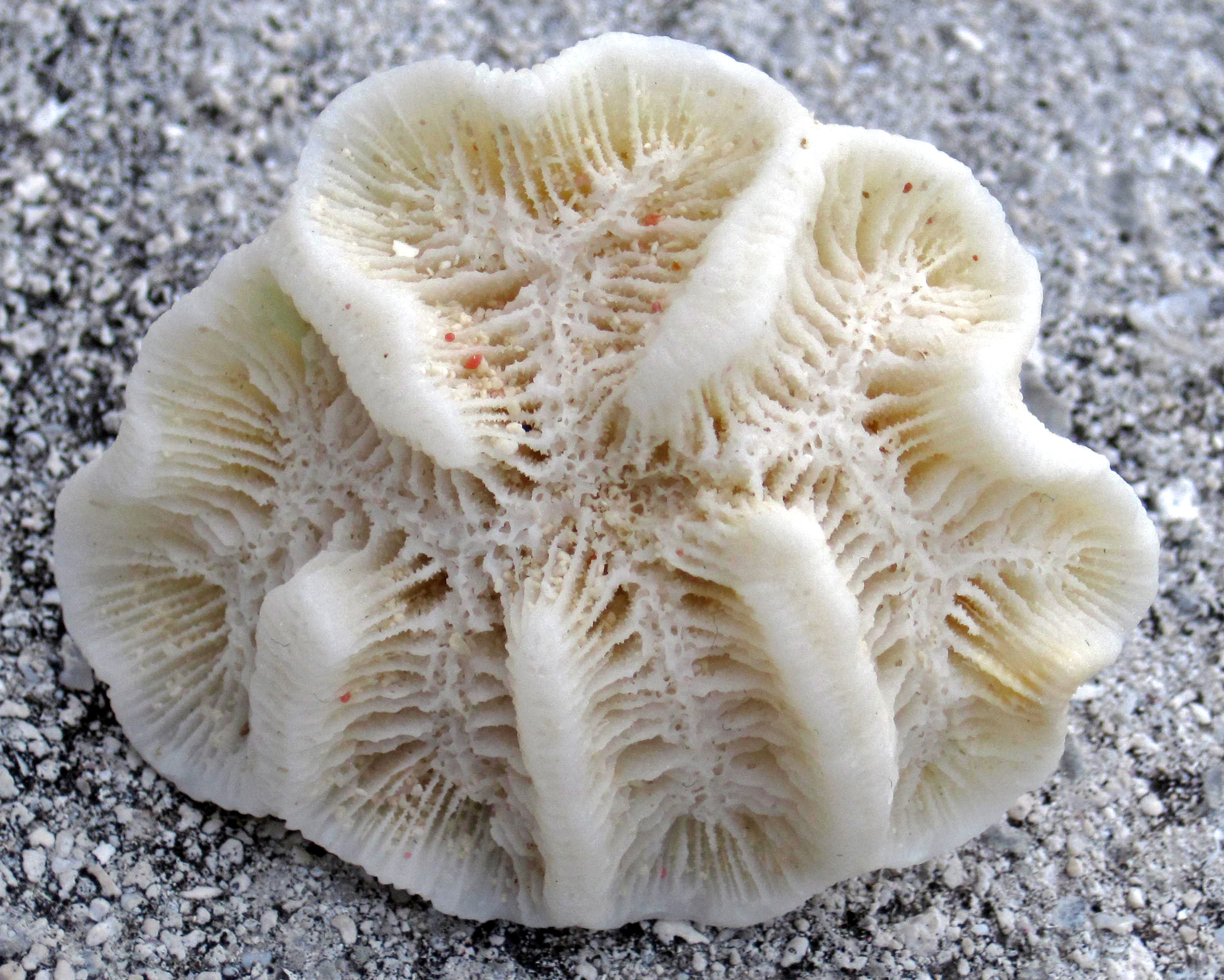
Skeleton

M. areolata is a colonial coral. Budding is intracalicular, occurring within the whorl of tentacles of the polyp. The corallites are arranged in a meandroid fashion, which means there are a series of linked centres in broad valleys, often 10 to 15 mm (0.4 to 0.6 in) wide, giving the colony the appearance of the surface of a human brain. The polyps share an elongate oral disc with the tentacles around the rim.

Colonies are small, often less than 10 cm (4 in) in diameter. Manicina areolata has two entirely different growth forms. Some individuals form small, solid hemispherical heads, while others are small, cone-shaped structures that are not attached to the seabed. The surface of the coral consists of long meandering walls with wide intervening valleys. The polyps sit in corallites (stony cups) in the valleys from which fine septa (transverse ridges) extend in several series up to the summit of the walls on either side. Often the whole coral consists of one long, convoluted valley, sometimes with side valleys. Where there is more than one valley, the intervening walls have grooves running along the top. The colour of this coral is yellowish-brown, tan or dark brown, often with the valleys and walls being contrasting colours. The polyps are only extended at night, and their oral surfaces are often green.

== Distribution and habitat ==
M. areolata is native to the tropical and subtropical West Atlantic Ocean. Its range includes the southern half of the Gulf of Mexico, the Caribbean Sea, southern Florida, the Bahamas and Bermuda. It is found on soft sediments, cobble or rubble, on fore-reef and back-reef slopes and in sea grass meadows. Usually occurring at depths of less than 10 m (33 ft), its lower depth limit is around 60 m (200 ft). The massive form is found on reefs attached to rocks, but the unattached form is found on areas of broken coral fragments and on sandy or muddy substrates, including lagoons and turtle grass (Thalassia testudinum) meadows.

== Ecology ==
The unattached cone-shaped form of Manicina areolata can right itself if overturned by a fish, current, or wave action. The polyps have pleats and muscles in the mesentries which enable them to extend further from the corallite than can small-polyp corals. This gives them the facility to inflate the body cavity with water, enabling the polyps to swell up and dislodge sediment, and even turn the colony over if this proves necessary. It does this by inflating itself by filling its interior with water and then emitting jets of water on one side to make the whole structure topple over. It is a slow process and is more difficult to achieve as the coral grows larger. This may be the reason that this coral seldom exceeds a diameter of 10 cm (4 in). This coral can rid itself of sediment that threatens to engulf it by producing mucus and sloughing this and the sediment that adheres to it like a skin. The tissues of this coral contain symbiotic unicellular algae called zooxanthella.

Manicina areolata is a hermaphrodite; the gametes are produced around the time of the full moon in May and June. Fertilisation is internal and the larvae are brooded inside the colony for two weeks before being released simultaneously on the night of the new moon. The larvae may drift planktonically or settle immediately.

Other corals that occupy a similar habitat, and which often co-occur with rose coral, are the free-living corals Porites divaricata, Cladocora arbuscula and several species of Oculina.

== Status ==
Rose coral is tolerant of a wide range of salinities and temperature variations and some degree of sedimentation. It is a common species and the International Union for Conservation of Nature has rated it as being of "least concern".
