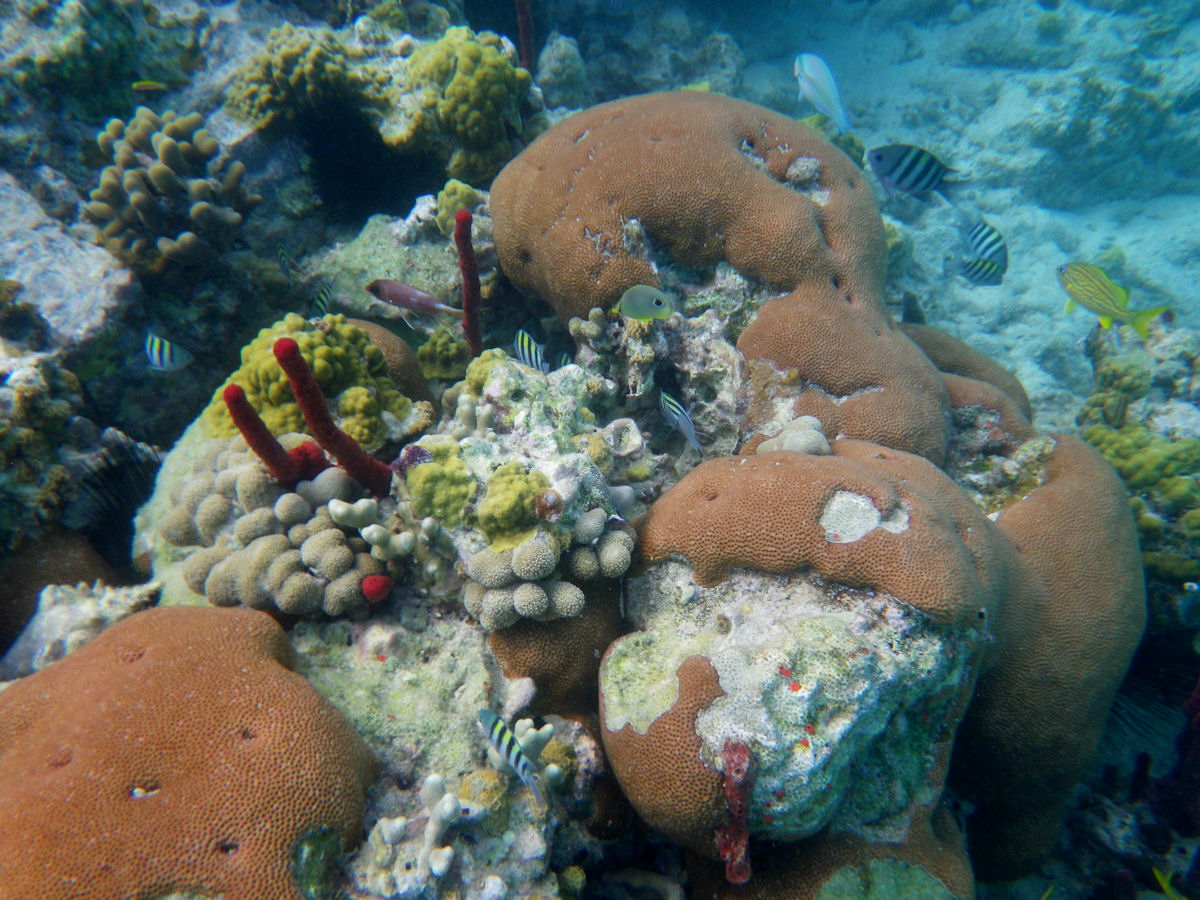

Conservation status
- Critically Endangered (IUCN 3.1)

- Apparently Secure (NatureServe)

Scientific classification
- Kingdom: Animalia
- Phylum: Cnidaria
- Subphylum: Anthozoa
- Class: Hexacorallia
- Order: Scleractinia
- Family: Siderastreidae
- Genus: Siderastrea
- Species: S. siderea

Binomial name
- Siderastrea siderea (Ellis & Solander, 1786)

Synonyms
- Siderastrea glynni Budd & Guzman, 1994

= Siderastrea siderea =

Massive starlet coral

Species of coral

Siderastrea siderea, commonly known as massive starlet coral or round starlet coral, is a stony coral in the family Siderastreidae. It is found in shallow parts of the western Atlantic Ocean as solid boulder-shaped or domed structures.

== Description ==
Siderastrea siderea is a colonial coral that forms low domes or boulder-shaped structures with a smooth dimpled surface as much as 2 metres (6 ft 7 in) wide on the seabed. It can be encrusting when young. The corallites, the calcareous cup-shaped depressions in which the polyps sit, are about 5 millimetres (0.20 in) wide with about 50 or 60 little ridges called septa. The general colour is reddish brown. This species can be confused with the closely related lesser starlet coral (Siderastrea radians) but that is usually smaller and has deeper, more angular corallites, each with 30 to 40 septa.

== Distribution and habitat ==
Siderastrea siderea is found in the Caribbean Sea and the northern Gulf of Mexico and round the coasts of southern Florida, the Bahamas and Bermuda. It can occur at depths of up to 40 metres (130 ft) but is most common in less than 10 metres (33 ft) of water. It is found on rocks in various reef environments but not in tidal pools or muddy areas.

In the IUCN Red List of Threatened Species, the massive starlet coral is listed as being critically endangered. It is moderately susceptible to coral bleaching but is capable of recovering when conditions improve.

== Research ==
Siderastrea siderea is a very slow growing species that lives to a great age. In a study, cores were drilled and samples taken from the coral in different zones in order to determine whether rates of growth had changed over the last hundred years. It was found that for backreef and nearshore specimens, the rates of extension of the skeleton had not changed significantly in this time period. However, the rate of growth for forereef corals had declined dramatically, this zone changing from being the one in which the fastest growth took place to the one with the slowest rates of extension. The reasons for this were not studied but possible causes include increased sedimentation and turbidity of the water, eutrophication or thermal stress. In the Florida Keys, this species showed greater rates of growth (calcification) in the remote Dry Tortugas National Park compared to at other off-shore sites on the Florida reef tract.
