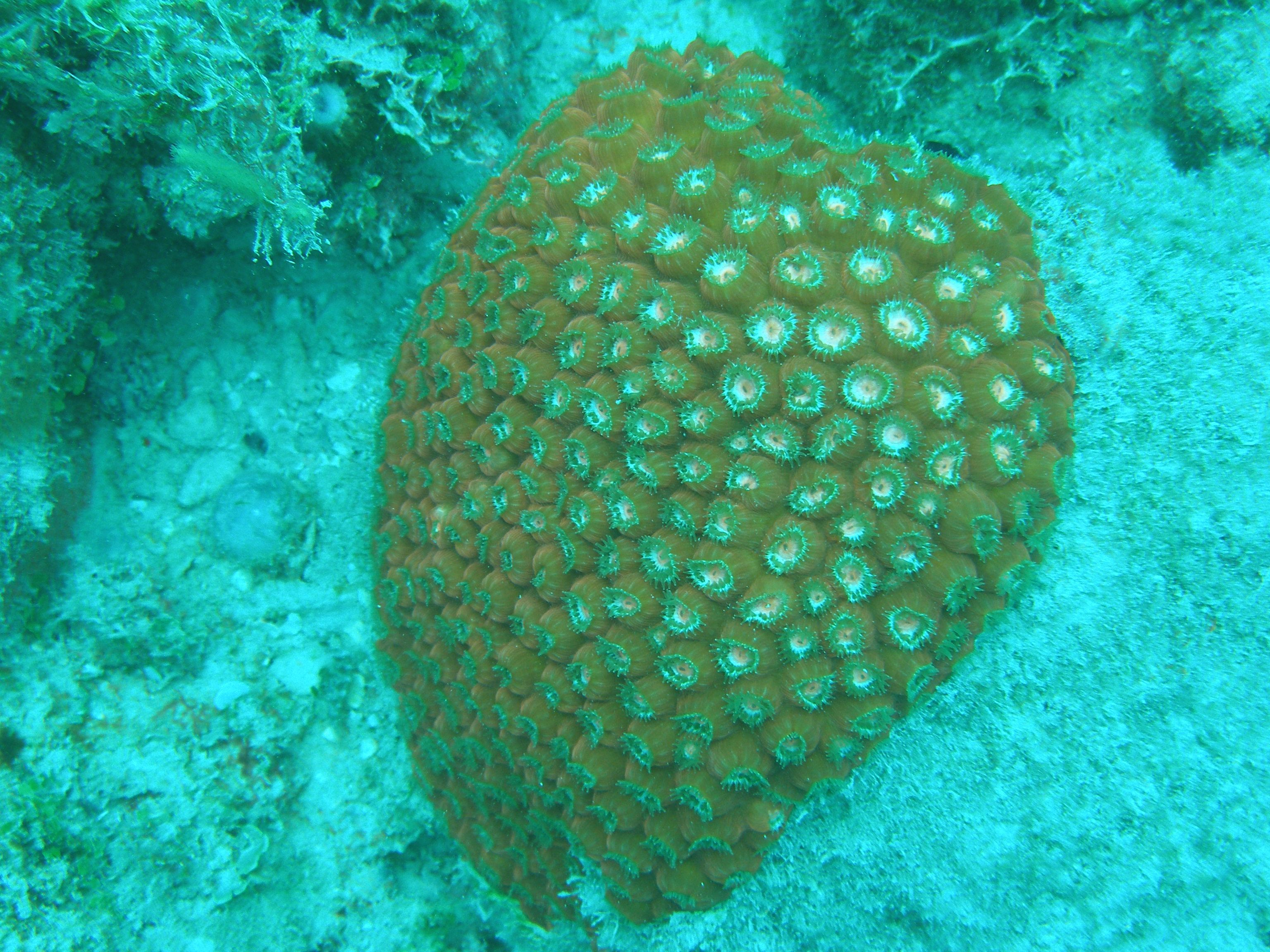

Conservation status
- Least Concern (IUCN 3.1)

- Secure (NatureServe)

Scientific classification
- Kingdom: Animalia
- Phylum: Cnidaria
- Subphylum: Anthozoa
- Class: Hexacorallia
- Order: Scleractinia
- Family: Montastraeidae; Yabe & Sugiyama, 1941
- Genus: Montastraea; Blainville, 1830
- Species: M. cavernosa

Binomial name
- Montastraea cavernosa (Linnaeus, 1767)

Synonyms
- List (Genus): Montastrea Vaughan & Wells, 1943 [lapsus]; Phyllocoenia Milne Edwards & Haime, 1848; (Species): Astraea radiata (Ellis & Solander, 1786); Madrepora cavernosa Linnaeus, 1767; Madrepora radiata Ellis & Solander, 1786; Montastraea brasiliana (Verrill, 1901) [lapsus]; Montastrea braziliana (Verrill, 1901); Montastrea cavernosa (Linnaeus, 1767) [lapsus]; Orbicella braziliana Verrill, 1901; Orbicella cavernosa (Linnaeus, 1767); Orbicella radiata (Ellis & Solander, 1786)

= Montastraea =

Great star coral

Genus of corals

Montastraea is a genus of colonial stony coral found in the Caribbean seas. It is the only genus in the monotypic family Montastraeidae and contains a single species, Montastraea cavernosa, known as great star coral. It forms into massive boulders and sometimes develops into plates. Its polyps are the size of a human thumb and fully extend at night.

== Description ==
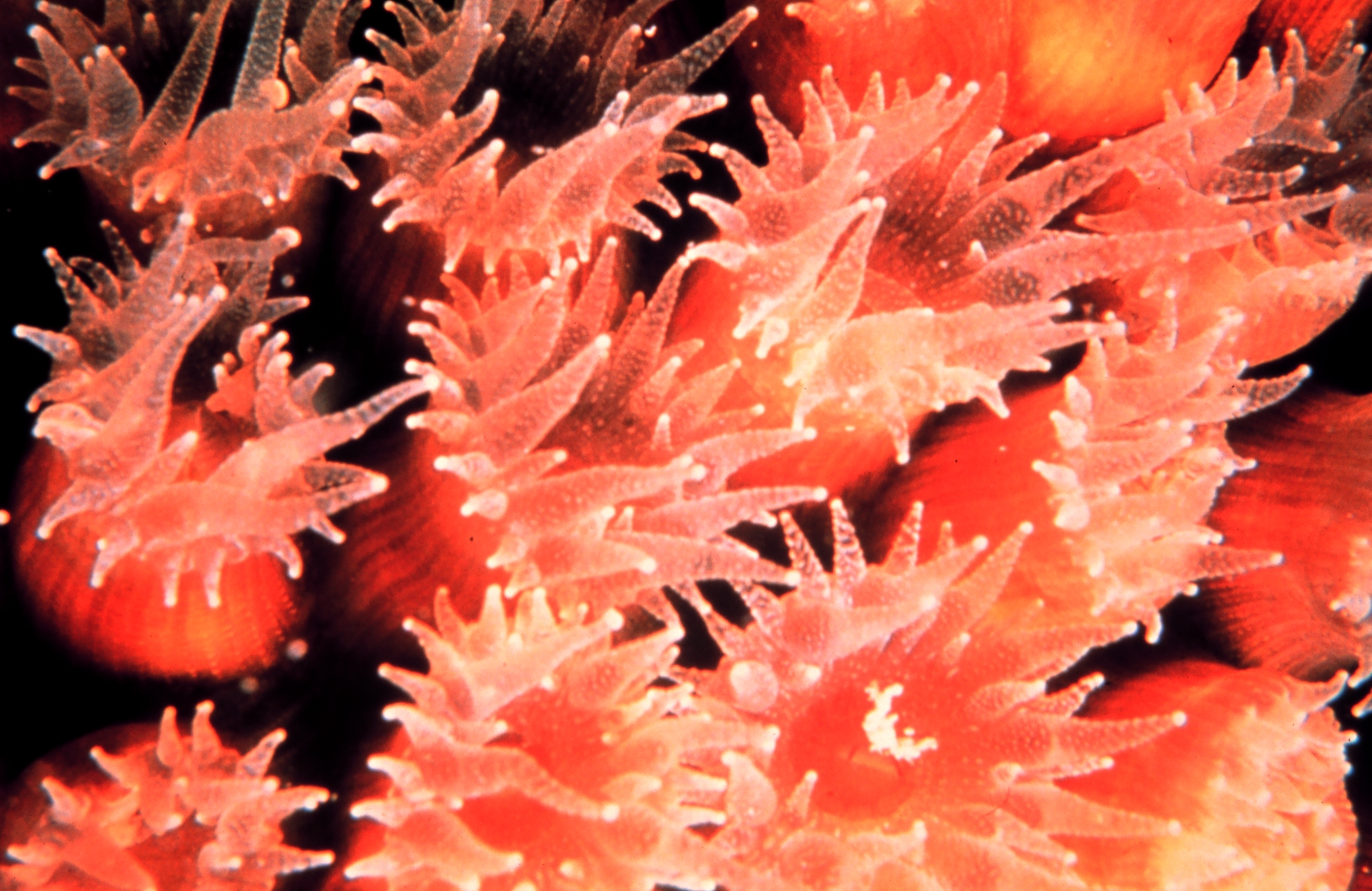
Close-up with polyps extended

Great star coral colonies form massive boulders and domes over 5 feet (1.5 m) in diameter in waters of shallow and moderate depths. In deeper waters, this coral has been observed growing as a plate formation. It is found throughout most reef environments, and is the predominant coral at depths of 40–100 feet (12.2–30.5 m).

This coral occasionally has a fluorescent red or orange color during daytime; it has recently been suggested that this hue is due to phycoerythrin, a cyanobacterial protein. It appears that, in addition to symbiotic zooxanthella, this coral harbors endocellular symbiotic cyanobacteria, possibly to help it fix nitrogen. However more recently, Oswold et al. (2007) showed an absence of functional phycoerythrin in M. cavernosa.

The species is gonochoric (colonies can be either male or female) and spawns one week after the full moon in late August. Skeletons show sex-related differences, with females having a less dense skeleton compared to males, which is presumably due to reallocating energy to egg production.

== Bleaching ==
The distinction of bleaching in reefs of M. cavernosa from merely white-coloured corals was shown to be difficult using standard reflectance techniques. A survey in the Bay of All Saints concluded that this may lead to nearly two-fold overestimation of bleaching.
