= Skeletal eroding band =

Coral disease

Skeletal eroding band (SEB) is a disease of corals that appears as a black or dark gray band that slowly advances over corals, leaving a spotted region of dead coral in its wake. It is the most common disease of corals in the Indian and Pacific Oceans, and is also found in the Red Sea.

So far one agent has been clearly identified, the ciliate Halofolliculina corallasia. This makes SEB the first coral disease known to be caused by a protozoan. When H. corallasia divides, the daughter cells move to the leading edge of the dark band and produce a protective shell called a lorica. To do this, they drill into the coral's limestone skeleton, killing coral polyps in the process.

A disease with very similar symptoms has been found in the Caribbean Sea, but has been given a different name as it is caused by a different species in the genus Halofolliculina and occurs in a different type of environment.

== Symptoms and history ==
Skeletal eroding band is visible as a black or dark gray band that slowly advances over corals, leaving a spotted region of dead coral in its wake. The spotted area distinguishes skeletal eroding band from black band disease, which also forms an advancing black band but leaves a completely white dead area behind it.

Skeletal eroding band was first noticed in 1988 near Papua New Guinea and then near Lizard Island in Australia's Great Barrier Reef, but was regarded as a gray variant of black band disease, as were instances off Mauritius in 1990. Surveys in 1994 in and around the Red Sea first identified the condition as a unique disease. It is now considered the commonest disease of corals in the Indian and Pacific Oceans, especially in warmer or more polluted waters.

The spread of the disease across an infected coral has been measured at 2 millimeters (0.079 in) in the Red Sea and 2 to 3 millimeters (0.079 to 0.118 in) around the Great Barrier Reef. Corals of the families Acroporidae and Pocilloporidae are the most vulnerable to infection. A study in 2008 found that the infection spread at about 2 millimeters (0.079 in) per day in colonies of Acropora muricata, eventually wiping out 95% of its victims. However, experiments showed that the disease easily spread to already dead and dying areas of corals but did not attack undamaged corals.

== Halofolliculina corallasia ==
So far one agent has been identified, the ciliate protozoan Halofolliculina corallasia. Skeletal eroding band is the first recorded disease of corals that is caused by a protozoan, and thus the first known to be caused by an eukaryote – most are caused by prokaryotic bacteria. For example, black band disease is caused by microbial mats of variable composition, and White pox disease by the bacterium Serratia marcescens.

H. corallasia is a sessile protozoan that secretes a bottle-like housing called a lorica (Latin for cuirass, flexible body armor), that is anchored to a surface and into which the cells retract when disturbed. When a mature individual cell division divides, it produces a pair of worm-like larvae that settle on undamaged coral just ahead of the black band. There each daughter cell secretes its lorica, at the same spinning to produce the lorica's flask-like shape. This spinning, combined with the chemicals that harden the lorica, crumble the coral skeleton and kill the polyps. The discarded loricae of the "parent" H. corallasia cells remain, leaving the distinctive spotted region in the wake of the living black band.

== "Caribbean ciliate infection" ==
A survey in the Caribbean Sea conducted in 2004 and published in 2006 reported a disease with very similar symptoms, affecting 25 species of coral within 6 families. Although the authors initially suspected H.corallasia, more detailed examination showed that the culprit was another species that was previously unknown and has not yet been formally named, although it is clearly a member of the same genus, Halofolliculina. A follow-up analysis noted that the Caribbean infestations were commonest in oceanic waters, while those in the Indian and Pacific Oceans were more prevalent in coastal waters. Because of these two differences, the authors gave this new manifestation the name "Caribbean ciliate infection". Coral diseases are a relatively new topic of research, and the use of standardized terminology has not yet been fixed.

== See also ==
- Aspergillosis, caused by the fungus Aspergillus sydowii, affects Gorgonian soft corals commonly known as sea fans.
- Black band disease, caused by a microbial consortium dominated by the cyanobacteria Phormidium corallyticum.
- Black necrosing syndrome, or Dark spots disease, probably fungal.
- Brown band disease, or Red band disease, probably caused by protozoa (possibly Helicostoma nonatum) and cyanobacteria.
- Rapid Wasting, possibly caused by a fungus growing on areas damaged by the feeding of the Stoplight parrotfish.
- White band disease, the cause of this disease remains unknown.
- White plague, caused by the bacterium Aurantimonas coralicida.
- White pox disease, caused by the bacterium Serratia marcescens.
- Yellow-band disease, possibly caused by an unidentified species of Vibrio
