= White pox disease =

Disease of coral

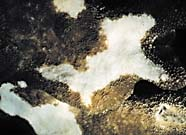
White pox disease on Elkhorn coral

White pox disease (also "acroporid serratiosis" and "patchy necrosis"), first noted in 1996 on coral reefs near the Florida Keys, is a coral disease affecting Elkhorn coral (Acropora palmata) throughout the Caribbean. It causes irregular white patches or blotches on the coral that result from the loss of coral tissue. These patches distinguish white pox disease from white band disease which produces a distinctive white band where the coral skeleton has been denuded. The blotches caused by this disease are also clearly differentiated from coral bleaching and scars caused by coral-eating snails. It is very contagious, spreading to nearby coral.

At the locations where white pox disease has been observed, it is estimated to have reduced the living tissue in elkhorn corals by 50–80%. In the Florida Keys National Marine Sanctuary (FKNMS), the losses of living coral are estimated to average around 88%. Elkhorn coral was formerly the dominant shallow water reef-building coral throughout the Caribbean but now is listed as a threatened species, due in part to the disease. Elkhorn coral is the first species of coral to be listed as threatened in the United States.

== Serratia marcescens ==
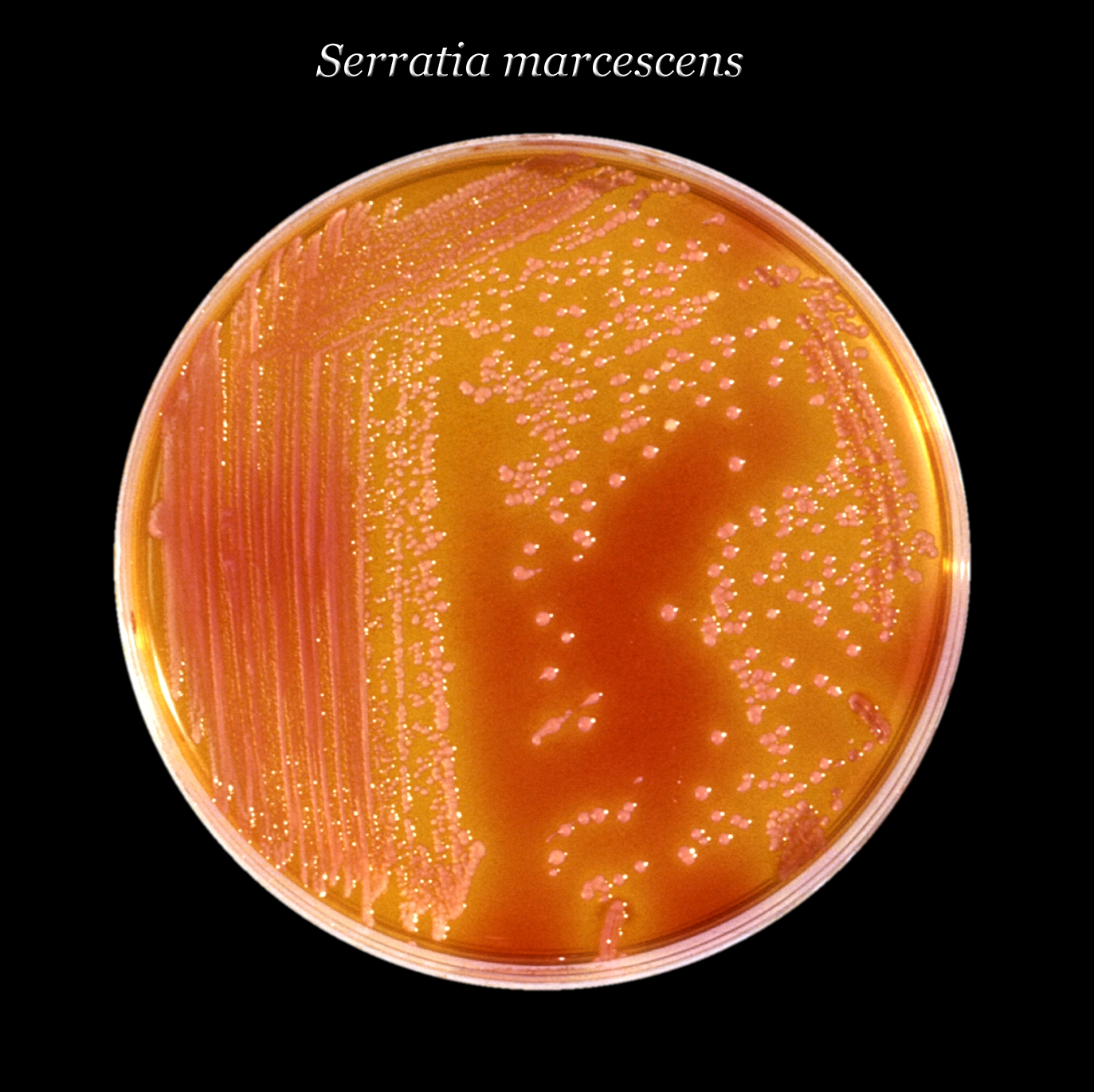
S. marcescens on an agar plate

The pathogen responsible is believed to be Serratia marcescens, a common intestinal bacterium found in humans and other animals. This is the first time it has been linked to the death of coral. The specific source of the bacteria that is killing the coral is currently unknown. As well as being a part of human and animal gut flora, S. marcescens can live in soil and water as a "free living" microbe. Research is needed to find and confirm the exact source(s) of the pathogen, possible sources include sewage treatment plant effluent, marine fish feces and seabird guano.

== See also ==
- Aspergillosis, caused by the fungus Aspergillus sydowii, affects Gorgonian soft corals commonly known as sea fans.
- Black band disease, caused by a microbial consortium dominated by the cyanobacteria Phormidium corallyticum.
- Black necrosing syndrome, or dark spots disease, probably fungal.
- Brown band disease, or red band disease, probably caused by protozoa (possibly Helicostoma nonatum) and cyanobacteria.
- Rapid wasting syndrome, possibly caused by a fungus growing on areas damaged by the feeding of the Stoplight parrotfish.
- White band disease, the cause of this disease remains unknown.
- White plague, caused by the bacterium Aurantimonas coralicida.
- Skeletal eroding band, caused by the protozoan Halofolliculina corallasia.
- Yellow-band disease, possibly caused by an unidentified species of Vibrio
