= White band disease =

Disease affecting marine corals

- Other names: Acroporid white syndrome
- White band disease affecting elkhorn coral (Acropora palmata) in Africa
- Specialty: Marine biology

White band disease is a coral disease that affects acroporid corals and is distinguishable by the white band of exposed coral skeleton that it forms. The disease completely destroys the coral tissue of Caribbean acroporid corals, specifically elkhorn coral (Acropora palmata) and staghorn coral (A. cervicornis). The disease exhibits a pronounced division between the remaining coral tissue and the exposed coral skeleton. These symptoms are similar to white plague, except that white band disease is only found on acroporid corals, and white plague has not been found on any acroporid corals. It is part of a class of similar disease known as "white syndromes", many of which may be linked to species of Vibrio bacteria. While the pathogen for this disease has not been identified, Vibrio carchariae may be one of its factors. The degradation of coral tissue usually begins at the base of the coral, working its way up to the branch tips, but it can begin in the middle of a branch.

== Appearance ==
White Syndrome in the Indo-Pacific

White band disease causes the affected coral tissue to spin off the skeleton in a white uniform band for which the disease was given its name. The band, which can range from a few millimeters to 10 centimeters (3.9 in) wide, typically works its way from the base of the coral colony up to the coral branch tips. The band progresses up the coral branch at an approximate rate of 5 millimeters per day, causing tissue loss as it works its way to the branch tips. After the tissue is lost, the bare skeleton of the coral may later by colonized by filamentous algae.

There are two variants of white band disease, type I and type II. In Type I of white band disease, the tissue remaining on the coral branch shows no sign of coral bleaching, although the affected colony may appear lighter in color overall. However, a variant of white band disease, known simply as white band disease Type II, which was found on Staghorn colonies near the Bahamas, does produce a margin of bleached tissue before it is lost. Type II of white band disease can be mistaken for coral bleaching. By examining the remaining living coral tissue for bleaching, one can delineate which type of the disease affects a given coral.

== Pathogen ==
No known pathogen has been isolated (it has only been attempted for type II) for white band disease, although there is a shift of bacterial composition in the surface layer where the band eats away as the coral tissue. The bacteria shifts from a dominant pseudomonad population to an increasingly dominant Vibrio carchariae population. Histopathological examinations of diseased tissue provide some insight into the specific pathogen or combination of pathogens that cause this disease. However, substantial samples of rickettsiales have been present in the surface layer, which causes scientists to suspect that this bacteria may be one of the factors of the disease.

The disease, however, typically begins from the base of the coral and works its way up the coral branches. As it progresses, the band leaves behind the white coral skeleton. Many of the details of how the breakdown of coral occurs due to the bacteria are unclear mainly in part to the difficulty in isolating marine bacteria. Studies have confirmed that white band disease is contagious and caused by a pathogenic bacteria. Experiments have shown that Ampicillin may be able to treat white band disease type I.

A recent study examined how coral immune systems respond to white band disease. This research investigates the relationship between microRNA expression and disease resistance in Caribbean corals infected with White Band Disease. The study exposed 12 Acropora cervicornis genotypes to the disease to identify immune responses that may contribute to resistance. Three of these genotypes showed differential immune responses in white band disease–resistant corals. The goal of this study is to understand why some corals are resistant while others are more vulnerable. The study focuses on coral cells and the corals' gene responses, highlighting the importance of internal coral mechanisms rather than external factors alone.

== Impact and range ==
Since white band disease was first reported in the 1970s, the disease has led to the devastation of approximately 95% of the elkhorn and staghorn corals in the Caribbean region. This resulted in both affected species being listed as threatened under the US Endangered Species Act and as critically endangered on the IUCN Red List. The decline in these corals has a lasting effect on both humans and the environment. Coral reefs protect coastlines from ocean currents, waves, and storms, and the death of these corals only increases the loss of coastlines in affected regions. Elkhorn and staghorn corals are two of the major reef-building corals, the foundation on which the rest of the coral reef is formed. Its loss means the loss of a habitat for many coral reef dwelling species such as lobsters, parrot-fish, snapper shrimps, and many other reef species, causing a sharp decline in the biodiversity of an affected region. Coral reefs are also home to more than twenty-five percent of all marine fish species, making them extremely biologically diverse. The loss of this coral would be particularly damaging to people living on the coast in terms of the food supply, coastal protection, economic security and more. Nearly 500 million people directly depend on coral reefs for food and income (through tourism or otherwise).

Elkhorn coral absorbs much carbon dioxide from the ocean every year, preventing ocean acidification and ocean temperature increases. Upon decomposing, Elkhorn coral releases its sequestered carbon dioxide back into the ocean, heating it and contributing to acidification. White band disease threatens more than just the coral with its lethal touch. In recent decades, the coral cover in coral reefs has been declining, providing for a transitional increase in the fleshy macroalgae cover in the Caribbean region as more and more filamentous algae colonize inside of the coral skeletons. The death of elkhorn and staghorn corals also substantially reduces coral cover and provides substratum space for further algal growth. Prospects are poor for the recovery of the elkhorn coral, given its asexual method of reproduction, which relies on coral fragments breaking off from the main body and growing in a new area. Staghorn coral also relies on asexual fragmentation as its primary method of reproduction; however, staghorn coral possesses a higher rate of sexual recruitment than Elkhorn coral.

White band disease has been reported most notably in the Caribbean region. However, white band disease has also been sighted in the Red Sea, and the Indo-Pacific region, including the Philippines, the Great Barrier Reef, and Indonesia. Unlike white band disease in the Caribbean region, white band disease in the Indo-Pacific region has been found on approximately 34 species of massive, branching and plating corals instead of just simply Elkhorn and Staghorn corals.

== Transmission ==
White band disease is highly contagious through direct contact between diseased and healthy coral tissue. It can also be transmitted by the corallivorous snail, which means that the species consumes coral, Coralliophila abbreviata. C. abbreviata, a species native to the region where Elkhorn and Staghorn corals are found, is able to act as a "reservoir" for white band disease, meaning that it is able to retain the disease pathogen for at least two weeks. However, not all corallivorous snails are able to transmit white band disease (i.e. Coralliophila caribaea). Waterborne transmission of the disease pathogen becomes possible when the coral tissue is lesioned (or otherwise injured). However, the potential for injury among the affected corals tends to be high given the many ways tissue injury may occur naturally including competition by other corals, mechanical damage, or corallivory by snails, damselfish, butterflyfish, fireworms, or other such aquatic organisms. Waterborne transmission helps to explain how the disease spread across the Caribbean so rapidly, given that direct contact between affected corals is limited to physical interaction between the diseased and healthy coral and that the corallivorous snail, C. abbreviata that carries the disease, does not travel across long distances.. In addition to direct contact and waterborne pathways, zooplankton may serve as vectors for White Band disease. Studies have shown that healthy Acropora cervicornis fragments exposed to zooplankton that had been near diseased coral got sick. In contrast, fragments exposed to zooplankton that had not contacted diseased coral stayed healthy. This suggests that zooplankton can carry white band disease and facilitate its transmission.

Insights into the nature of white band disease transmission provide understanding of how the disease might be managed and controlled to prevent major losses in coral. Waterborne transmission of white band disease may prove difficult to manage however, given the flowing nature of ocean currents. An alternative method would be to control C. abbreviata populations to reduce the incidence of white band disease by manually removing samples of the population, similar to efforts to remove Pterois from the Gulf of Mexico.

Scientists can now examine the transmission in microbial communities between healthy and diseased corals. A recent study evaluated the concordance between microbial and visual health indicators of white band disease in nursery-reared Caribbean coral Acropora cervicornis. The 2023 study indicates that the disease affects only microbes in sick areas, not the entire coral. The study suggests that early detection at the site of infection is crucial for controlling disease spread between healthy and infected corals

A 2025 study by researchers at Northeastern University tested whether treating healthy coral fragments with antibiotics could prevent white band disease. The study found that pretreated corals were much less likely to become infected. Antibiotic pretreatment reduced infection rates by about 30 percentage points compared to untreated fragments.

== Effects of climate change ==
White band disease prevalence in the Caribbean varies seasonally. It is more active in summer and less prominent in winter, suggesting that warmer water temperatures contribute to the waterborne spread of the disease to affected corals. The impacts of climate change and increasing carbon emissions only serve to heat the waters surrounding the coral reef ecosystems, which may allow for the spread of diseases such as white band disease and others. The severity of marine diseases such as white band disease increase for several reasons. Elevated water temperature can cause corals physiological stress. This possibly undermines their immune systems and makes them more susceptible to infection from white band disease or other coral diseases. Furthermore, elevated temperatures make bacterial and fungal pathogens much more virulent. However, the disease is not limited to elevated water temperatures as white band disease can still be prevalent even when water temperatures are cool.

Anthropogenic climate change is negatively impacting the world's corals and coral reef ecosystems. Over the next few decades as climate change continues, oceanic warming and acidification will accelerate and further damage the fragile reef ecosystems. Prediction of the impacts of future climate change on coral reefs can be difficult given the uncertainty in certain involved socioeconomic factors (i.e. political response, future technology, changes in human behavior, the Earth's climate system, and the realtime effects on coral reefs). Despite these uncertainties, humans could see the extinction of the coral reef ecosystem by the end of the 21st century if actions are not taken to protect them. According to forecast models of increasing oceanic temperature, mass mortality events will likely occur as early as the summer of 2030 and continue to occur on an annual basis.

== Environmental Factors ==
The expansion of the human population and development in coastal areas leads to an increase in pollution, which is threatening coral reef health. Nutrient pollution, such as fertilizer runoff or sewage, can influence coral disease, weakening coral immune responses. Fertilizer runoff or sewage contains high levels of nutrients and pathogens, which harm coral reefs and other marine life. Studies on several Caribbean coral species, including Siderastrea siderea, Orbicella annularis, and O. franksi, have found that nutrient enrichment increases disease prevalence and disease progression. These findings definitely highlight how nutrient pollution may increase the severity of the coral epidemic.

Studies have shown that extreme weather changes, such as hurricanes, may also contribute to the increase of white band disease. Following Hurricane Dean, a study was conducted in the Banco Chinchorro Biosphere Reserve in Mexico to investigate the relationship between coral disease and the hurricane. The study found that physical damage from storms can increase the vulnerability of corals to disease. These results highlight the interaction between storms and coral disease in reef ecosystems.

== See also ==
- Aspergillosis, caused by the fungus Aspergillus sydowii, affects Gorgonian soft corals commonly known as sea fans.
- Black band disease, caused by a microbial consortium dominated by the cyanobacteria Phormidium corallyticum.
- Black necrosing syndrome affects gorgonian from the Great Barrier Reef, possibly a fungal pathogen similar to aspergillosis.
- Brown band disease reported only from the Great Barrier Reef, cause is unknown although the dense brown band preceding the disease lesion contains the presence of ciliates (although not to be mistaken with Helicostoma nonatum.)
- Dark spots disease, cause currently unknown, possibly an environmental stressor rather than a true pathogenic disease.
- Rapid Wasting Syndrome, possibly caused by a fungus growing on areas damaged by the feeding of the stoplight parrotfish
- Skeletal Eroding Band, associated with the ciliate Halofolliculina corallasia.
- White plague, caused by the bacterium Aurantimonas coralicida.
- White pox disease, caused by the bacterium Serratia marcescens.
- Yellow-band disease AKA Yellow blotch disease, thought to be caused by Vibrio spp.
