= Black band disease =

Coral disease

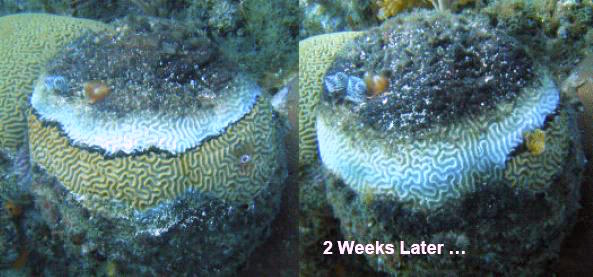
Example of black band disease progression on a colony of Diploria strigosa

Black band disease is a coral disease in which corals develop a black band. It is characterized by complete tissue degradation due to a pathogenic microbial consortium. The mat is present between apparently healthy coral tissue and freshly exposed coral skeleton.

== Appearance ==
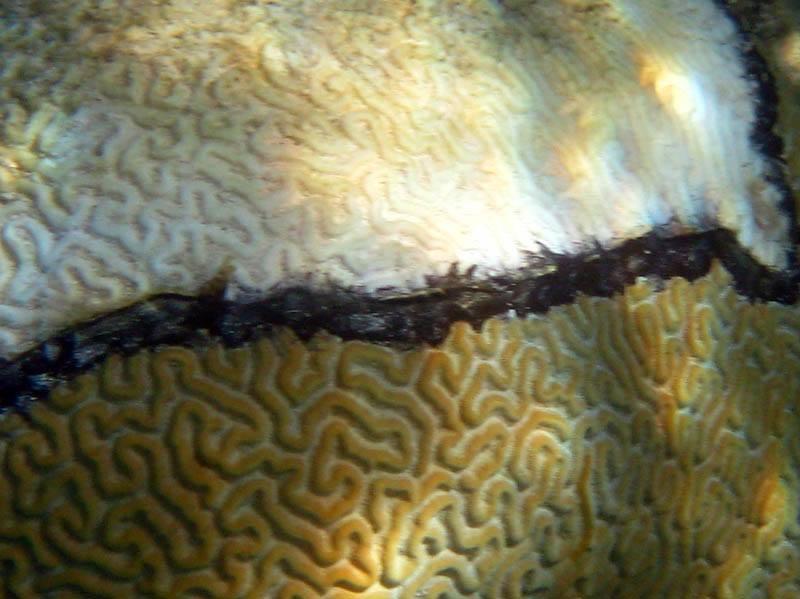
Black band disease on a brain coral in Caribbean Sea near Bahia de la Chiva on the island of Vieques, Puerto Rico

Black band disease was first observed on reefs in Belize in 1973 by A. Antonius, who described the pathogen he found infecting corals as Oscillatoria membranacea, one of the cyanobacteria. The band color may be blackish brown to red depending on the vertical position of a cyanobacterial population associated with the band. The vertical position is based on a light intensity-dependent photic response of the cyanobacterial filaments, and the color (due to the cyanobacterial pigment phycoerythrin) is dependent on the thickness of the band. The band is approximately 1 millimeter (0.04 in) thick and ranges in width from 1 millimeter (0.04 in) to 7 centimeters (2.8 in). White specks may be present on surface, at times forming dense white patches. The pathogenic microbial mat moves across coral colonies at rates from 3 millimeters (0.12 in) to 1 centimeter (0.4 in) a day. Tissue death is caused by exposure to a hypoxic, sulfide-rich microenvironment associated with the base of the band.

== Composition ==
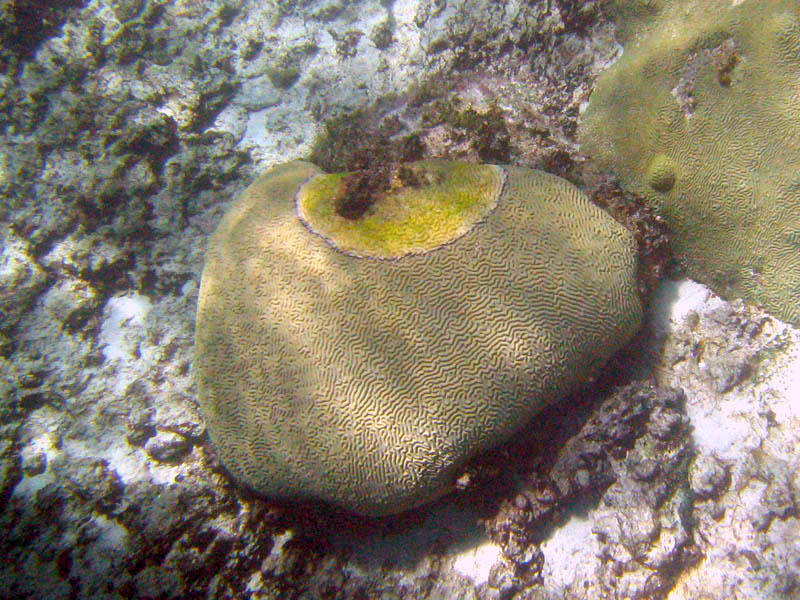
Buck Island Reef National Monument, 2010

The black band microbial consortium consists of an assortment of photosynthetic and non-photosynthetic bacteria that co-exist synergistically. The consortium has three functionally and physically dominant members as well as numerous heterotrophic members whose role in the disease is as yet unknown. The three functionally dominant members are populations of cyanobacteria and sulfide-oxidizing and sulfate-reducing bacteria. The black band disease microbial consortium is structurally and functionally identical to cyanobacterial-dominated microbial mats found in other illuminated, sulfide-rich environments

== Taxonomy ==
Several species of cyanobacteria have been found associated with black band disease, the most well-known of which is Phormidium corallyticum. Sulfide-oxidizing bacteria, dominated by Beggiatoa spp., are present in well-developed bands and exhibit visible vertical migrations within the band matrix (Richardson, 1996; Viehman and Richardson, 2006). When present on the band surface Beggiatoa appears white due to intracellular inclusions of stored elemental sulfur. Sulfate-reducing bacteria dominated by Desulfovibrio spp. are present at the base of the band and are responsible for producing high concentrations of sulfide within the band matrix. Light microscopic observation of black band reveals motile (gliding) filaments of P. corallyticum that are 4 mm wide, with one round end and one narrow (sharply tapering) end. Also present are gliding Beggiatoa filaments (1–4 mm wide) that are non-pigmented but contain highly refractive intracellular granules of elemental sulfur. Numerous gram-negative bacteria (small rods) are also present but not identifiable using light microscopy. The bacterial population has been characterized using molecular techniques and was found to contain over 500 species of bacteria that are different from bacterial communities found in the water column, healthy coral tissue, or dead coral skeleton. The functional role of this diverse population of bacteria is not known.

Black band disease affects 42 species of coral in a worldwide distribution. The only known reservoir is within cyanobacterial biofilms that are present on sediments in depressions of healthy black band disease susceptible corals.

Black band disease significantly affects boulder star coral in the reef ecosystem, allowing for more staghorn coral to grow.

== See also ==
- Aspergillosis, caused by the fungus Aspergillus sydowii, affects Gorgonian soft corals commonly known as sea fans.
- White pox disease, caused by Serratia marcescens
- Black necrosing syndrome, or Dark spots disease, probably fungal.
- Brown band disease, or Red band disease, probably caused by protozoa (possibly Helicostoma nonatum) and cyanobacteria.
- Rapid Wasting, possibly caused by a fungus growing on areas damaged by the feeding of the Stoplight parrotfish.
- White band disease, the cause of this disease remains unknown.
- White plague, caused by the bacterium Aurantimonas coralicida.
- Skeletal Eroding Band, caused by the protozoan Halofolliculina corallasia.
- Yellow-band disease, possibly caused by an unidentified species of Vibrio
