= Yellow-band disease =

Bacterial disease of coral

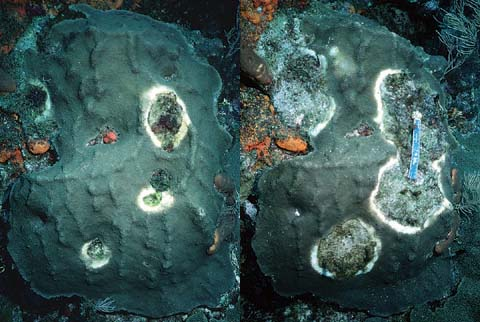
Samples of yellow-band disease. Left: a coral in the early stages of an attack. Right: same coral several weeks later

Yellow-band disease (similar to Yellow Blotch disease) is a coral disease that attacks colonies of coral at a time when coral is already under stress from pollution, overfishing, and climate change. It is characterized by large blotches or patches of bleached, yellowed tissue on Caribbean scleractinia corals.

Yellow-band disease is a bacterial infection that spreads over coral, causing the discolored bands of pale-yellow or white lesions along the surface of an infected coral colony. The lesions are the locations where the bacteria have killed the coral's symbiotic photosynthetic algae, called zooxanthellae which are a major energy source for the coral. This cellular damage and the loss of its major energy source cause the coral to starve, and usually cause coral death. There is evidence that climate change could be worsening the disease.

== Mechanism of action ==
Coral has a symbiotic relationship with zooxanthellae that provide the coral glucose, glycerol, and amino acids. Under certain water conditions, like fluctuating temperatures and increased nitrogenous waste, corals will appear stressed. Also, these conditions allow for bacteria to grow inside the coral and compete with zooxanthellae. The bacteria produces the characteristic pale yellow lesions and eventually kills the zooxanthellae by impairing its mitosis and its ability to carry out photosynthesis. Yellow-band disease is found on coral reefs in the Caribbean.

== Impact ==
Yellow-band disease has severely affected reef building corals in the Caribbean. This disease have been associated with lower coral fecundity, altered tissue composition and a lower activities of antixenobiotic and antioxidant enzymes. Compared to the late 1990s, current data suggests that the disease remains a severe epidemic. In one study, 10 meter belt transects were taken at various depths, sampling coral colonies in the Lesser Antilles. At a depth of 5 m, yellow band rings and lesions were found on 79% of the colonies per transect, and only 21% of the colonies in this depth range appeared healthy.

Recent research indicates that yellow-band disease continues to be in an infectious phases in the Caribbean. It has been found to cause infection in Pacific coral as well.

== See also ==
- Aspergillosis, caused by the fungus Aspergillus sydowii, affects Gorgonian soft corals commonly known as sea fans.
- Black band disease, caused by a microbial consortium dominated by the cyanobacteria Phormidium corallyticum.
- Black necrosing syndrome, or Dark spots disease, probably fungal.
- Brown band disease, or Red band disease, probably caused by protozoa (possibly Helicostoma nonatum) and cyanobacteria.
- Rapid wasting, possibly caused by a fungus growing on areas damaged by the feeding of parrotfish Sparisoma viride.
- White band disease, the cause of this disease remains unknown.
- White plague, caused by the bacterium Aurantimonas coralicida.
- Skeletal eroding band, caused by the protozoan Halofolliculina corallasia.
