= Bickella =

Scientific classification
- Domain: Eukaryota
- Clade: Sar
- Superphylum: Alveolata
- Phylum: Ciliophora
- Class: Heterotrichea
- Order: Heterotrichida
- Family: Folliculinidae
- Genus: Bickella; Wilbert & Song, 2008
- Species: B. antarctica

Binomial name
- Bickella antarctica Wilbert & Song, 2008

Genus of single-celled organisms

Bickella antarctica is a species of littoral free-swimming folliculinid ciliates, first found near King George Island. It has a typical Folliculina morphology barring its absence of lorica. It is the sole species in the genus Bickella.
