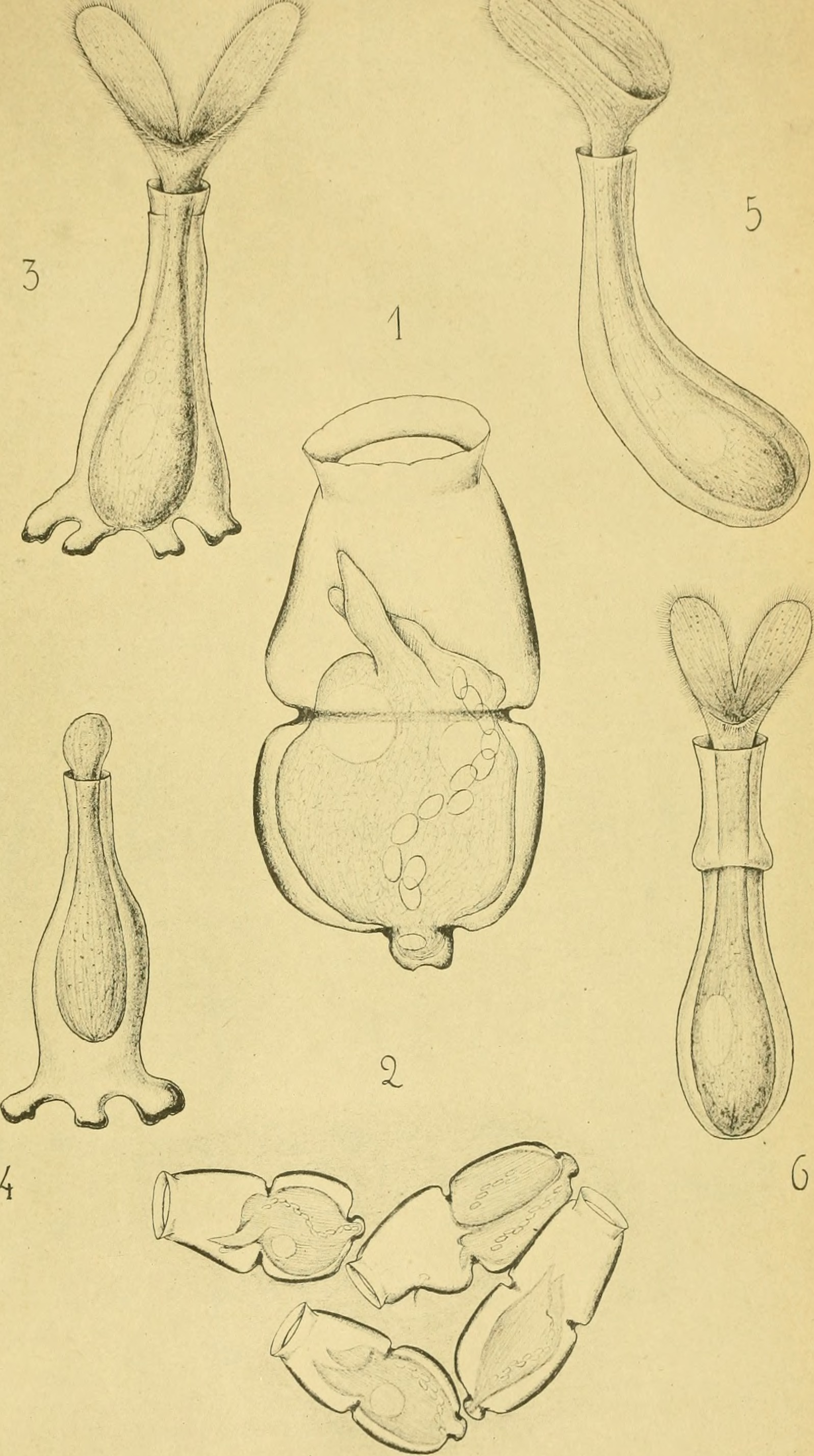
- Drawings of Folliculina limnoriae (3,4), F. abyssorum (5) and F. violacea (6)

Scientific classification
- Domain: Eukaryota
- Clade: Diaphoretickes
- Clade: SAR
- Clade: Alveolata
- Phylum: Ciliophora
- Class: Heterotrichea
- Order: Heterotrichida
- Family: Folliculinidae; Dons, 1914

Genera
- Ampullofolliculina; Ascobius; Bickella; Diafolliculina; Eufolliculina; Folliculina; Folliculinopsis; Freia (genus); Halofolliculina; Lagotia; Metafolliculina; Mirofolliculina; Orthofolliculina; Parafolliculina; Pseudofolliculina

= Folliculinidae =

Family of single-celled organisms

The Folliculinidae are a family of ciliates in the class Heterotrichea, with the common name "bottle-animalcule".

== Description ==
Folliculinids are called "bottle-animalcules" because mature individuals are sessile and live inside a bottle-shaped lorica (shell). The cell body has two wing-shaped protrusions, called peristomal wings, which carry the ciliary structures which are part of the oral apparatus, by which they feed. Mature folliculinids are often attached to substrates like algae, plants, and animal shells or carapaces. They can be found in both marine and freshwater habitats, and feed on bacteria and other eukaryotic microorganisms.

Many species are pigmented, and some species from the deep sea that live near hydrothermal vents form large and extensive mats, which are called "blue mats" because of the color from the ciliates. These blue-mat folliculinids have a symbiotic association with bacteria, which may be found within the lorica, attached to the surface of the ciliate, and also inside the ciliate cells themselves. Most of these bacteria are methanotrophs, which can use methane coming from the hydrothermal vents as a source of carbon and energy.

About 30 genera of folliculinids are known, including Folliculina and Eufolliculina. The folliculinid species Halofolliculina corallasia are argued by some to cause a disease in corals called Skeletal Eroding Band (SEB) syndrome.
