= Coral disease =

Coral diseases are transmissible pathogens that cause the degradation of coral colonies. Coral cover in reef ecosystems has decreased significantly for a diverse set of reasons, ranging from variable environmental conditions to mechanical breakdowns from storms. In recent years, diseases that infect and kill coral have shown to be a threat to the health of coral reefs. Since the first coral disease was reported in 1965, many different kinds of diseases have popped up in mostly Caribbean waters. These diseases are diverse, including pathogens of bacteria, fungi, viruses, and protozoans. Coral diseases have widespread implications, impacting entire ecosystems and communities of organisms. Researchers are working to understand these diseases, and how potential treatments could stop these pathogens from causing the widespread death of corals in a way that permanently impacts the community structure of reefs.

== Stress factors ==
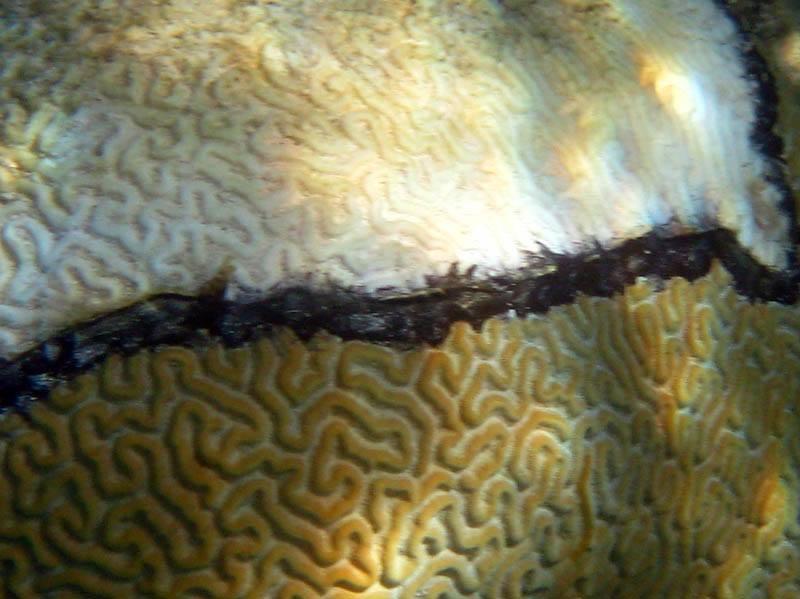
Black band disease on a brain coral in the Caribbean Sea

Like other organisms, stony corals and soft corals are subject to disease. This may not have been obvious in the past, but is becoming increasingly apparent in the twenty-first century. The rising ill health of corals is partially the result of the corals being subjected to increasing amounts of stress as the physical environment around them becomes less suited to their needs. Corals live within a precise range of abiotic environmental conditions including water temperature, salinity and water quality. Variations outside the normal range of these parameters may make the corals less able to grow and reproduce successfully, and may make them more susceptible to diseases. One of the major consequences that can occur with stress is the coral expelling its zooxanthellae, which are mutualistic algae that live inside coral. Corals without their symbionts become bleached, which effectively kills them since they are unable to gain the correct nutrients without their symbionts. Corals being sensitive to stress factors makes it difficult to study diseases, because the pathogen could impact any part of the coral-symbiont mutualism in the same ways that environmental factors do.

== Pathogens ==
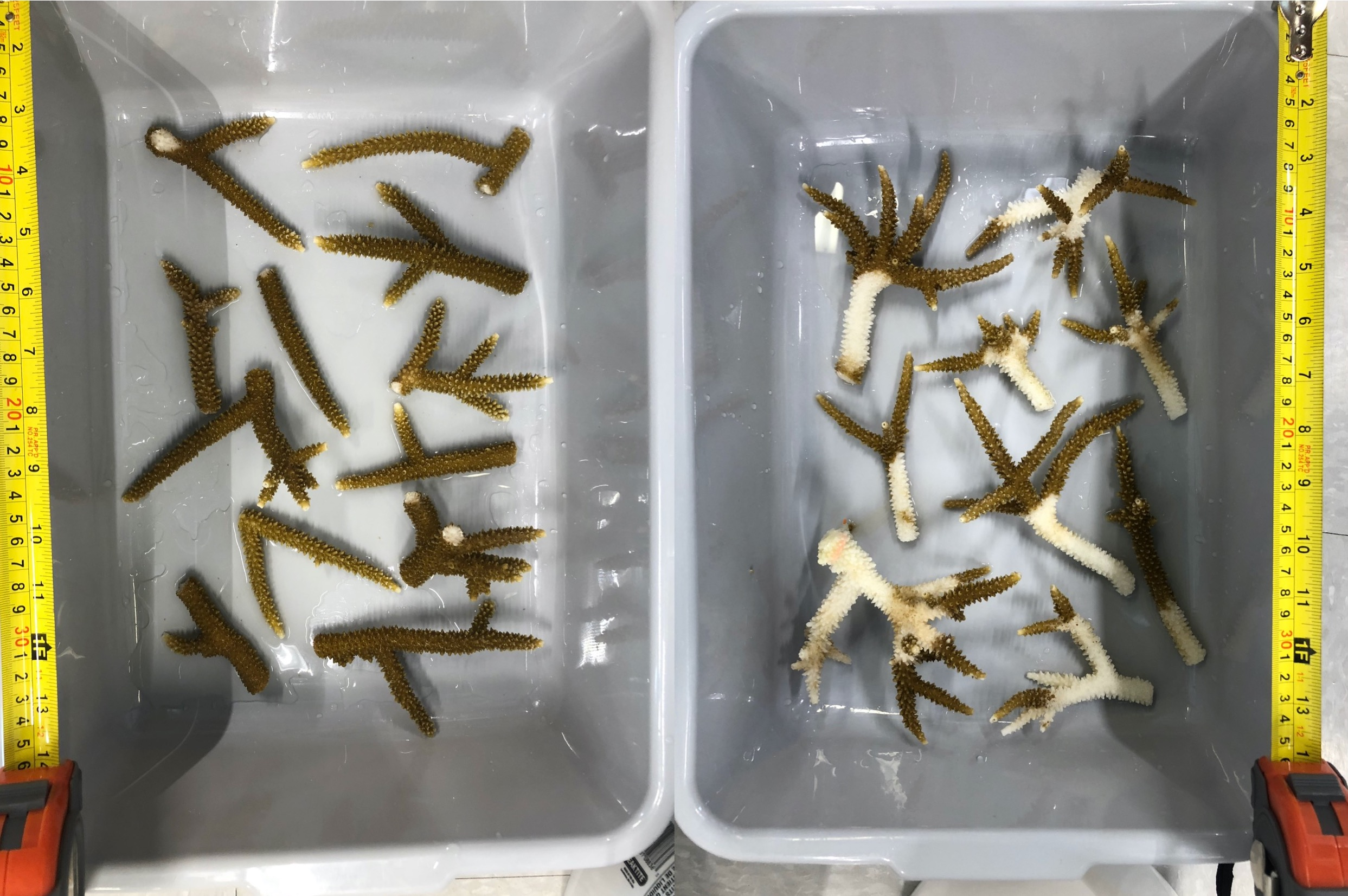
Healthy (left) and diseased (right) staghorn coral

Since corals have algal symbionts, they are considered animals and plants. This means they are impacted by both animal viruses and plant viruses. These plant and animal pathogens can come from marine environments, or crossover from terrestrial diseases.

Little is still known about how these diseases transmit, and scientists are still researching how to control diseases and protect corals. Studies do show that there is no vertical transmission in coral pathogens. This means corals do not pass diseases to their offspring through gametes, and that coral pathogens are transmitted through contagion from host-to-host.

In many instances it has not been possible to identify the pathogens responsible for the disease by culturing them in the laboratory. This is because some diseases have many different kinds of bacteria associated with them. For example, 50 different bacteria varieties have been found on sites of black band disease. Also, it is not always clear if fungi or bacteria present on dead necrotic tissues are caused by the disease, or if the bacteria is simply feeding on the dead tissues. The way that pathogens impact corals also varies depending on the type of pathogen and species of coral. For example, cyanobacteria pathogens are able to affect the coral's ability to do work, including blocking nitrogen fixing. This means that when coral symbionts try to change nitrogen into a usable form for the coral, pathogens will block this ability to do work. Another example is a small circular single-stranded DNA (ssDNA) virus being present in association with diseased tissue on white plague disease.

== Identification ==
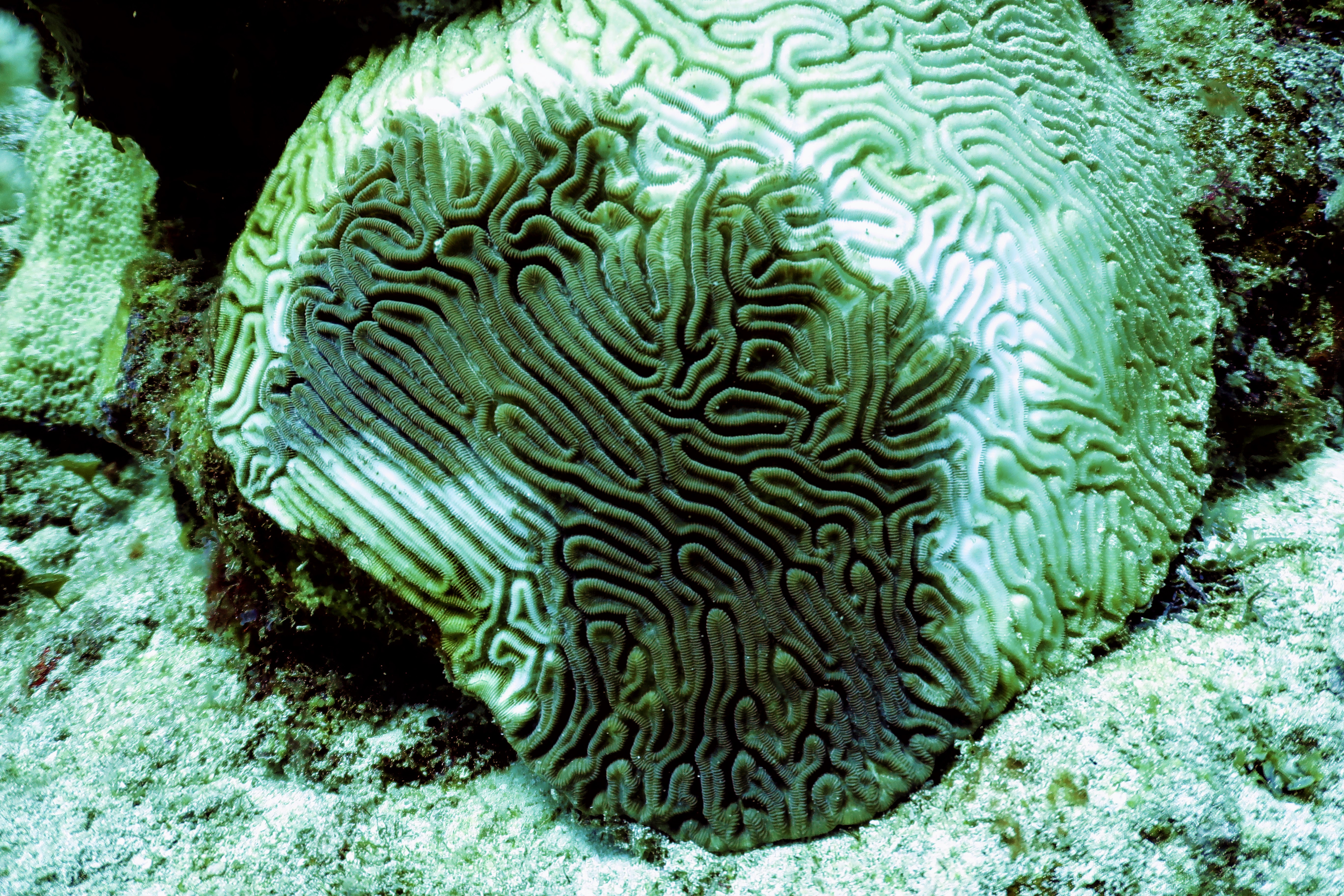
tissue loss resulting from disease in a brain coral species

There are some visible signs that a coral has a disease. This includes, but is not limited to, tissue loss, abnormal coloration, and mistakes in skeleton structure. These symptoms show that corals have diseases, but they can also be caused by environmental factors. Without an understanding of what cellular interactions are occurring, diseases can be difficult to diagnose.

The most common way to tell if a coral is healthy is by looking at its coloration. A dead or unhealthy coral will be bleached, which means they have 40%-50% or more of their pigmentation missing. Some coral diseases take the form of a narrow band of diseased tissue separating the living tissue from the exposed skeleton. The band can move across the surface of the colony at the rate of a few millimeters a day, leaving behind bleached skeletal material.

The physical coloration of coral is an easy way of identifying some pathogens, since many diseases are identified by their most obvious symptoms such as black band disease, white pox and yellow-band disease. Sometimes diseases look identical on a macroscopic level, and need to be identified in other ways. For example, multiple diseases cause a break in pigmentation, which gives the coral a white band. Since a white band is a similar symptom in different diseases, identification of those diseases can be difficult. In these cases the diseases are labeled through the rate at which they affect the coral. For white band diseases, their rates of tissue loss range from 0.1(cm/day) in white plague disease to 9(cm/d) in white band disease 2. White plague and white band disease 2 both have the same outward symptoms, but the rate at which they infect corals are drastically different, distinguishing them as different diseases.

== Resistance ==
Although not a lot is known about how corals and their symbionts resist pathogens, corals do have an innate immune system. This means that corals do have some resistance to diseases. When corals are exposed to pathogens they will produce antibiotic compounds to help protect them. This includes the secretion of mucus, which can harbor antibacterial properties. In addition to antibiotics, corals have other natural defenses against illnesses. Phagocytosis is a cellular defense that corals use in order to target pathogens. It involves healthy cells migrating to the location of the pathogen to get rid of it through the process of phagocytosis.

== Distribution ==
Although coral diseases are problematic on any reef environment, Caribbean reefs are the biggest hotspot for diseases, especially compared to Indo-Pacific reefs. Over 70% of disease reports come from Caribbean areas, affecting 75% of hard coral species found in those areas.

Coral diseases that are distributed throughout an area can have a big impact on other parts of reef communities. Not only do coral diseases impact the overall accretion and surface area of the coral, it also affects coral reproduction, the diversity and prosperity of reef species, topography of structures, and community dynamics. Disease outbreaks can also shift community dynamics in reefs, where species with previously small populations could outgrow more dominant species because of disease outbreaks. Specifically, White Pox disease in the Florida Keys have impacted the prevalence of A. Palmata corals by reducing their numbers by 70%. This shows that coral diseases not only impact individuals, but also have a ripple effect to entire reef communities.

Coral diseases also impact aquarists and coral laboratory settings. These diseases, however, are seemingly different from the diseases in the wild. Studies have found that some diseases impact aquarium corals, but are not an issue in the wild, and vice versa. For example, red bug parasites are unique to aquariums, with no wild counterparts having been documented yet. There are also some parasitic flatworm species that infest aquarist's tanks, but are not seen in the wild. These differences in diseases in the wild and aquariums is thought to be because of the varying conditions in the two environments, including water quality and captive coral breeding.

== Climate change ==
Corals and their symbionts are sensitive to environmental abiotic changes, and these environmental factors could make the corals more vulnerable to catching pathogens. Environment factors include, but are not limited to, changing ocean water temperatures, increased rainfall, more frequent storms, ocean acidification, and rising sea level. These changes in environmental factors are byproducts of climate change, which means that climate change has the potential to impact the prevalence of coral diseases.

Some coral diseases show variations depending on which season it is. Patterns show that diseases are more pervasive in warmer months during the summer. Because of this, rising ocean temperatures related to climate change could be making coral diseases more prevalent, although evidence is not conclusive because of other complex factors that connect to seasonality. Furthermore, the rise in sea temperature from climate change is expected to increase the frequency and severity of tropical storms. These storms do mechanical damage to reefs, through increased wave action, and stirring up and re-deposition of sediment. If coral reefs are damaged, they are less likely to be able to ward off diseases due to higher levels of stress.

Other stress factors related to climate change include an increase in pollution for pathogens to feed on with more rain and runoff, increased ultraviolet radiation, and a reduction in the aragonite saturation of surface seawater that is connected with ocean acidification.

== Conservation ==
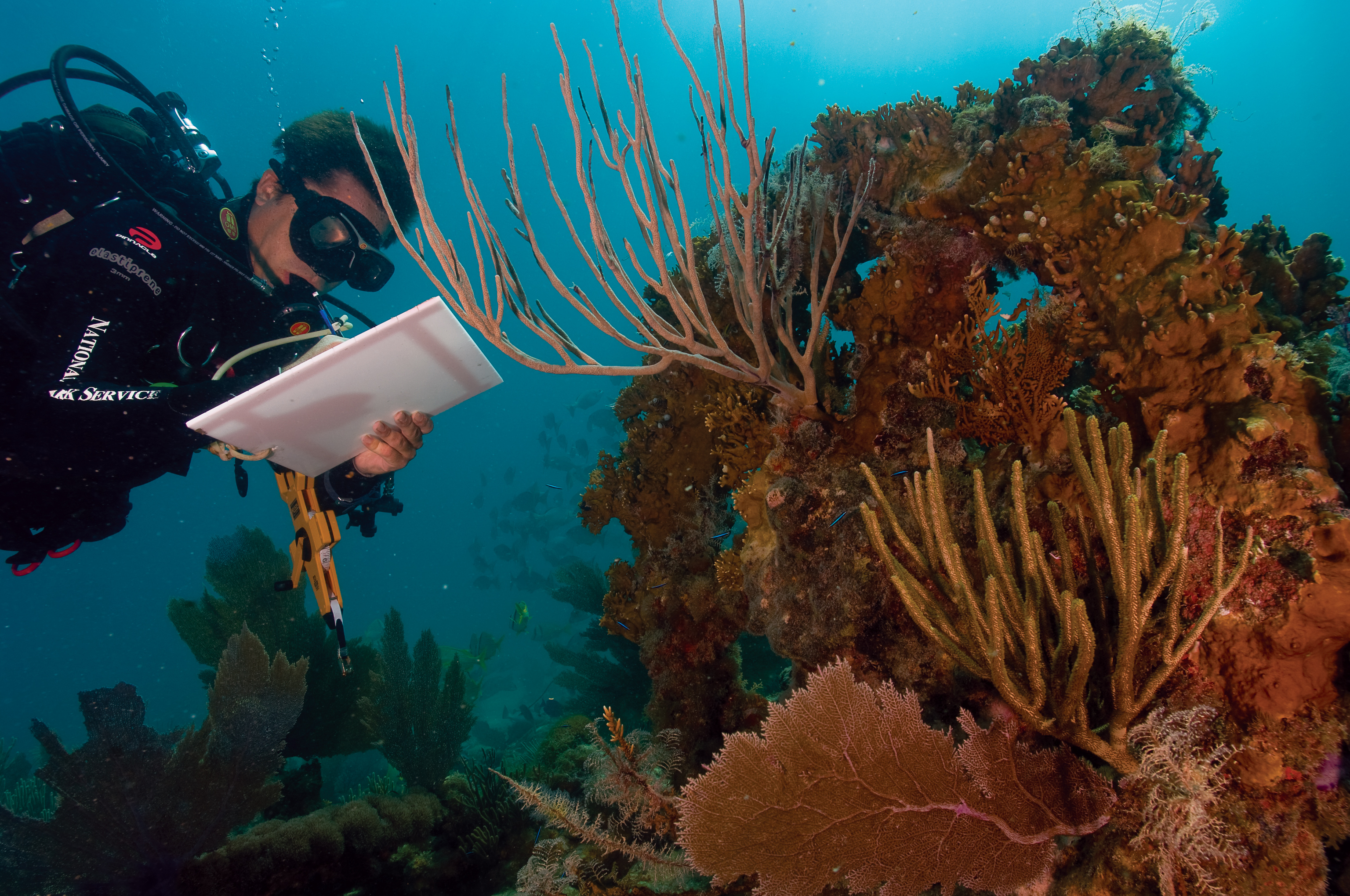
Scientist researching coral in Virgin Islands National Park

Coral diseases have the possibility to change the structures of reefs in a negative way, because one-third of corals are at risk of going extinct because of coral bleaching. This bleaching, partially caused by diseases, is linked to a decrease in coral cover and loss of biodiversity in reefs. This rapid loss of a healthy environment has pushed conservation biologists to begin focusing more on how to help conserve coral reefs for the future.

Coral diseases are also shown to impact other parts of reef communities. They not only impact the overall accretion and surface area of the coral, they also affect coral reproduction, the diversity and prosperity of reef species, topography of structures, and community dynamics. This means that coral diseases are not only an issue for individual coral colonies, but are also a danger to coral reef ecosystems as a whole.

There has been a recent push in conservation to research pathogen load on corals, as future researchers may be able to predict and prevent pathogens outbreaks in the future. Conservation biologists and researchers are still learning how corals interact with their environment and diseases, which is critical for the conservation of corals in relation to diseases.

The future conservation for coral reef diseases relies heavily on being able to quickly diagnose and implement conservation efforts towards specific coral diseases. To help with this, the Global Coral Reef Monitoring Network (GCRMN) is working to create a standardized method for identifying and labeling coral diseases. This will improve the ease of researching and publishing information on specific diseases, which would allow conservation biologists to implement conservation tactics targeting certain corals or diseases.

Since researchers are still studying how diseases impact corals, it is difficult to find a "cure" that works against coral pathogens. Work has been done for treatments that work in a lab or aquarium setting, but these treatments cannot be used in the wild due to the widespread nature of corals, the cost of treatments, and considerations of how it could impact the environment.

== Coral diseases ==
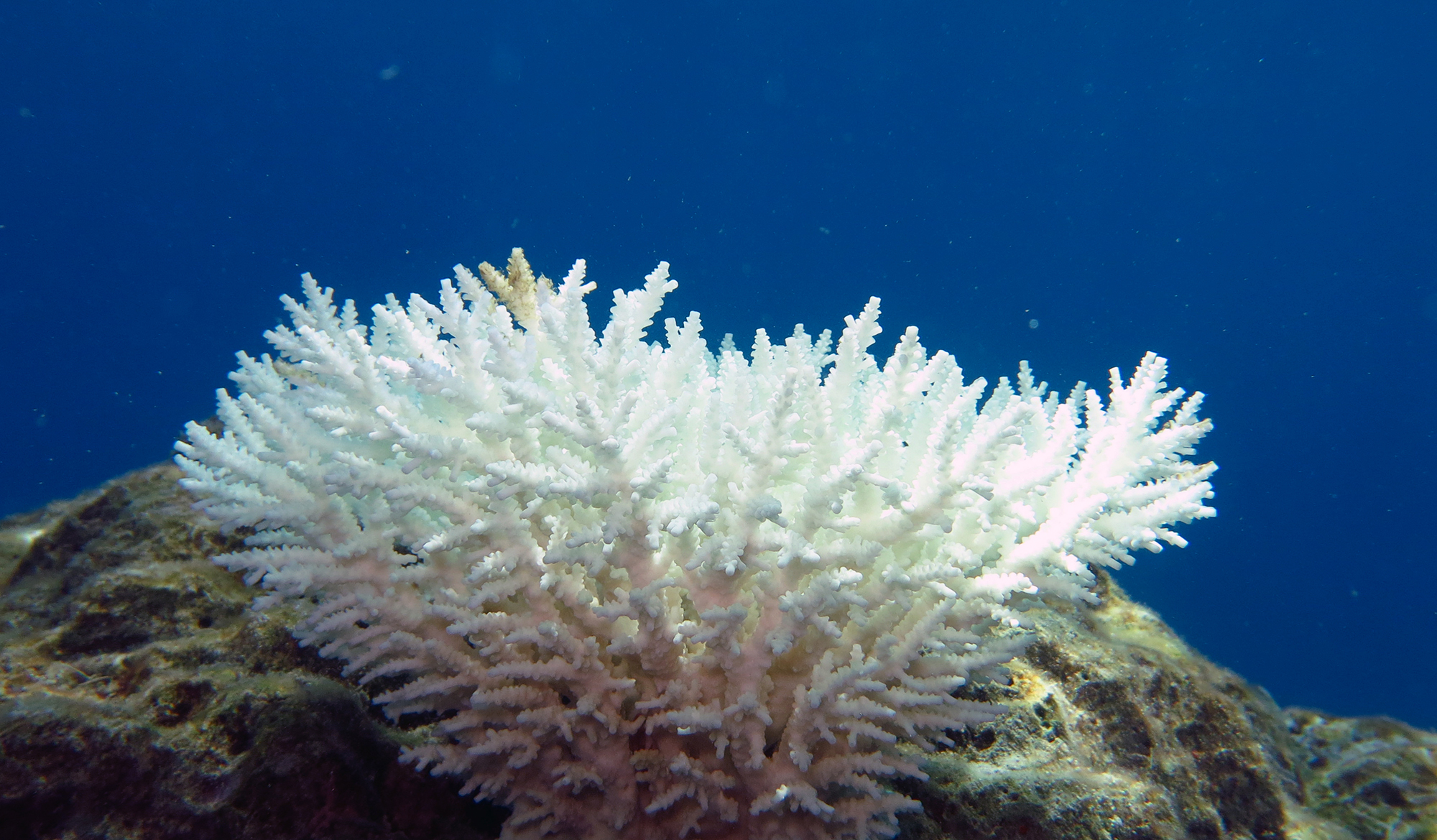
Partially bleached Acropora colony

- Aspergillosis, caused by the fungus Aspergillus sydowii, affects Gorgonian soft corals commonly known as sea fans.
- White pox disease is caused by Serratia marcescens bacteria, and can be identified by white spots on the coral.
- Black Necrosing Syndrome is a fungal disease that leads to the death of clumps of tissues on gorgonian corals.
- Black band disease impacts a variety of coral species, and is caused by cyanobacteria that degenerates the tissues of the coral skeleton.
- Brown band disease is brought about by infections caused by protozoa. It can be identified through a brown band that separates healthy portions of coral skeleton from unhealthy sections of the skeleton.
- Rapid wasting disease is caused by fungus growing on areas damaged by the feeding of parrotfish.
- White band disease is a collective term for diseases that have similar white appearances that cannot be easily differentiated from one another. White syndrome diseases include White Band Disease 1 and 2 and White Plague 1, 2, and 3.
- Skeletal eroding band (SEB) erodes away parts of the coral skeleton while building up its own loricae, which has a black appearance. It is caused by the protozoan Halofolliculina corallasia.
- Yellow-band disease is caused by a bacterial pathogen.
- Bacterial bleaching is bleaching caused by the bacterial pathogen Vibrio shiloi.
- Ulcerative white spot disease is caused by vibrio bacteria.
- Growth anomalies, like enlarged polyps, are caused by microorganisms. An example of this is a trematode infecting a finger coral (Porites compressa).
- Brown jelly disease is caused by ciliate protozoans.
- Red slime algae is a kind of cyanobacteria that can infect corals.
- Red bug disease are parasitic organisms that infest corals. This disease only occurs in aquariums.
