= Halofolliculina =

Scientific classification
- Domain: Eukaryota
- Clade: Diaphoretickes
- Clade: SAR
- Clade: Alveolata
- Phylum: Ciliophora
- Class: Heterotrichea
- Order: Heterotrichida
- Family: Folliculinidae
- Genus: Halofolliculina; Hadzi, 1951

Genus of protozoans

Halofolliculina is a genus of ciliates belonging to the family Folliculinidae.

Species:

- Halofolliculina annulata (Andrews, 1944) Hadzi, 1951
- Halofolliculina corallasia
- Halofolliculina elegans (Claparède & Lachmann, 1858) Ringuelet, 1953
