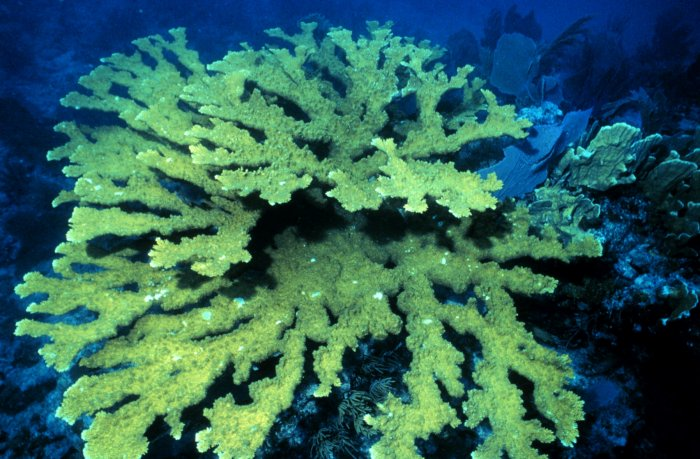

Conservation status
- Critically Endangered (IUCN 3.1)

- Critically Imperiled (NatureServe)

Scientific classification
- Kingdom: Animalia
- Phylum: Cnidaria
- Subphylum: Anthozoa
- Class: Hexacorallia
- Order: Scleractinia
- Family: Acroporidae
- Genus: Acropora
- Species: A. palmata

Binomial name
- Acropora palmata (Lamarck, 1816)

Synonyms
- List: Acropora alces (Dana, 1846); Acropora flabellum (Lamarck, 1816); Isopora muricata palmata (Lamarck, 1816); Madrepora muricata palmata Lamarck, 1816; Madrepora alces Dana, 1846; Madrepora cornuta Duchassaing & Michelotti, 1860; Madrepora flabellum Lamarck, 1816; Madrepora palmata Lamarck, 1816; Madrepora perampla Horn, 1861; Madrepora thomassiana Duchassaing & Michelotti, 1860

= Elkhorn coral =

Species of coral

Elkhorn coral (Acropora palmata) is an important reef-building coral in the Caribbean. The species has a complex structure with many branches which resemble that of elk antlers; hence, the common name. The branching structure creates habitat and shelter for many other reef species. Elkhorn coral is known to grow quickly with an average growth rate of 5 to 10 cm (2.0 to 3.9 in) per year. They can reproduce both sexually and asexually, though asexual reproduction is much more common and occurs through a process called fragmentation.

Although Elkhorn coral dominated the Caribbean in the early 1980s, the species has since dramatically declined in numbers. Scientists have estimated that between 1980 and 2006, when it was listed in the Endangered Species Act (ESA), the population declined by around 97%. This decline was due to a variety of factors, including disease, algae growth, climate change, ocean acidification, and human activity. In May 2006, Elkhorn coral was officially listed as threatened in the ESA along with another species in the Acropora genus, staghorn coral. Some conservation efforts are now in place to protect the species and promote increased genetic variability among the species. Following the 2023 marine heatwave, Elkhorn corals are now considered functionally extinct within Florida’s Coral Reef.

== Species overview ==
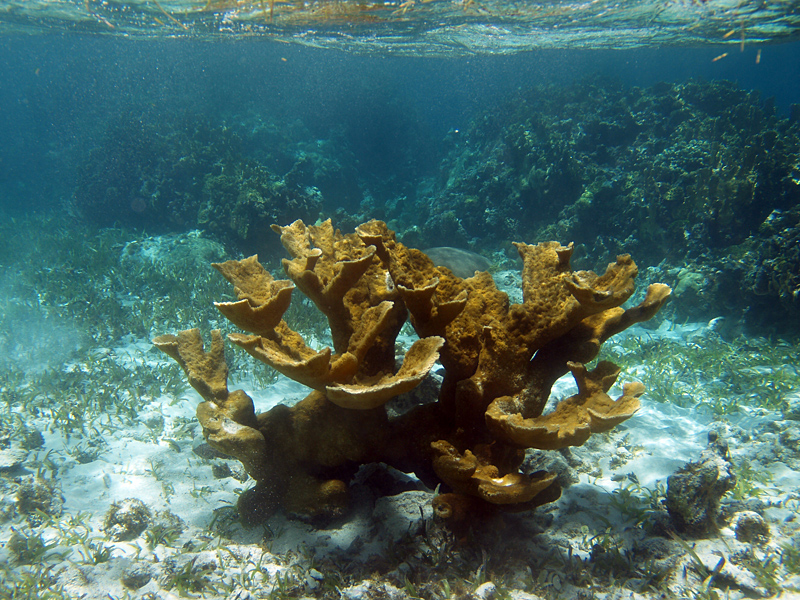
Elkhorn coral habitat

=== Appearance ===
Elkhorn coral produce hard antler-like structures composed of calcium carbonate. These structures can be over 2 (> 6 ft.) meters high and 13 meters (43 ft) wide and are a dull, brownish-yellow.

=== Diet ===
Elkhorn coral's primary source of nutrients comes from photosynthetic algae, zooxanthellae, that live inside the coral's cells. Therefore, Elkhorn coral are highly dependent on the sunlight for sustenance, leaving Elkhorn coral vulnerable to increased turbidity or water clarity. During bleaching events, or long-term periods of increased turbidity, Elkhorn coral can obtain nourishment from alternative food sources through filter feeding.

==== Zooxanthellae ====
As mentioned, Elkhorn coral have special algae living in their tissues known as zooxanthellae. Zooxanthellae meet their nutritional requirements using photosynthesis, a process that converts carbon dioxide and water into sugars and oxygen. Elkhorn coral provide habitat for these algae and, in turn, receive an abundant source of oxygen, enabling them to grow quickly.

==== Filter feeding ====
Elkhorn coral can also use filter feeding techniques to obtain food. At night, Elkhorn coral use their tentacles to snatch free-swimming zooplankton from the water. Zooplankton complete daily diel migrations. In the morning, zooplankton sink to the depths of the ocean where predators are scarce, and then come nightfall, they rise back towards the surface. By concentrating their predation activities at night, Elkhorn coral expend less energy catching large amounts of prey. However, because filter feeding is more energy intensive than relying on zooxanthellae, Elkhorn coral will only resort to this feeding method when water conditions are poor and block out sunlight.

=== Habitat ===
Elkhorn coral live in shallow habitats, which give them abundant access to light. Like all animals, Elkhorn coral requires oxygen to survive, most of which they obtain through special, photosynthetic algae living in their tissues called zooxanthellae. Therefore, in order to help zooxanthellae produce as much oxygen as possible, Elkhorn coral live in shallow regions between 1 and 5 meters deep to ensure that abundant light reaches the zooxanthellae, maximizing photosynthesis.

== Elkhorn niche ==
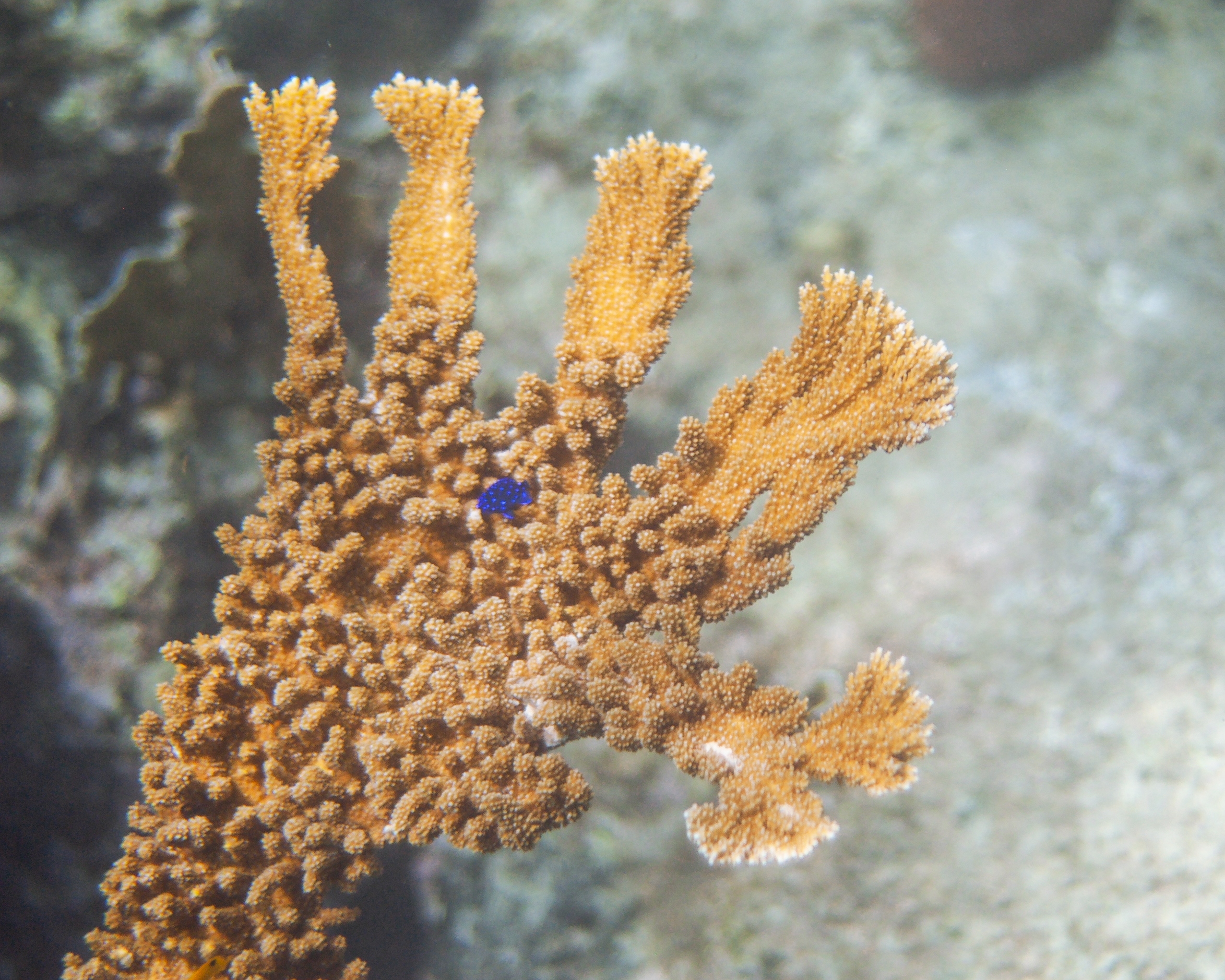
Elkhorn Coral with a Yellowtail Damselfish (Microspathodon chrysurus) in the Caribbean Sea in Curaçao

=== Niche habitat ===
These corals are found in clear, shallow water throughout the Bahamas, Florida, the Caribbean, and beyond to the northern shores of Venezuela. The most northern region occupied by Elkhorn coral is off the coast of Broward County, Florida. Characteristically found in shallow, turbulent water ranging from 1 to 5 meters (3 ft 3 in to 16 ft 5 in), Elkhorn coral thrive best in high-energy zones where wave action is frequent. This success is because wave action increases fragmentation, which allows more new colonies to form.

=== Niche evolution ===
Due to fragmentation and rapid growth rates, Elkhorn coral were the primary foundation in the development of the Caribbean coral reefs. Over the last 5,000 years, Elkhorn coral, Staghorn coral, and Star coral comprised the southeastern reefs. Research has shown that the Elkhorn coral evolved during the Mid-Pliocene epoch, 5.2–2.58 million years ago. The unstable climate during this period allowed Elkhorn coral to thrive during glacial and interglacial events. During glacial events, sea levels rise and cause an increase in wave energy. As previously mentioned, Elkhorn coral does best in environments that are shallow and experience high energy changes, which aid in the reproductive process.

== Ecosystem services ==
Through their ecosystem services, Elkhorn coral increase the commercial value of coral reefs.

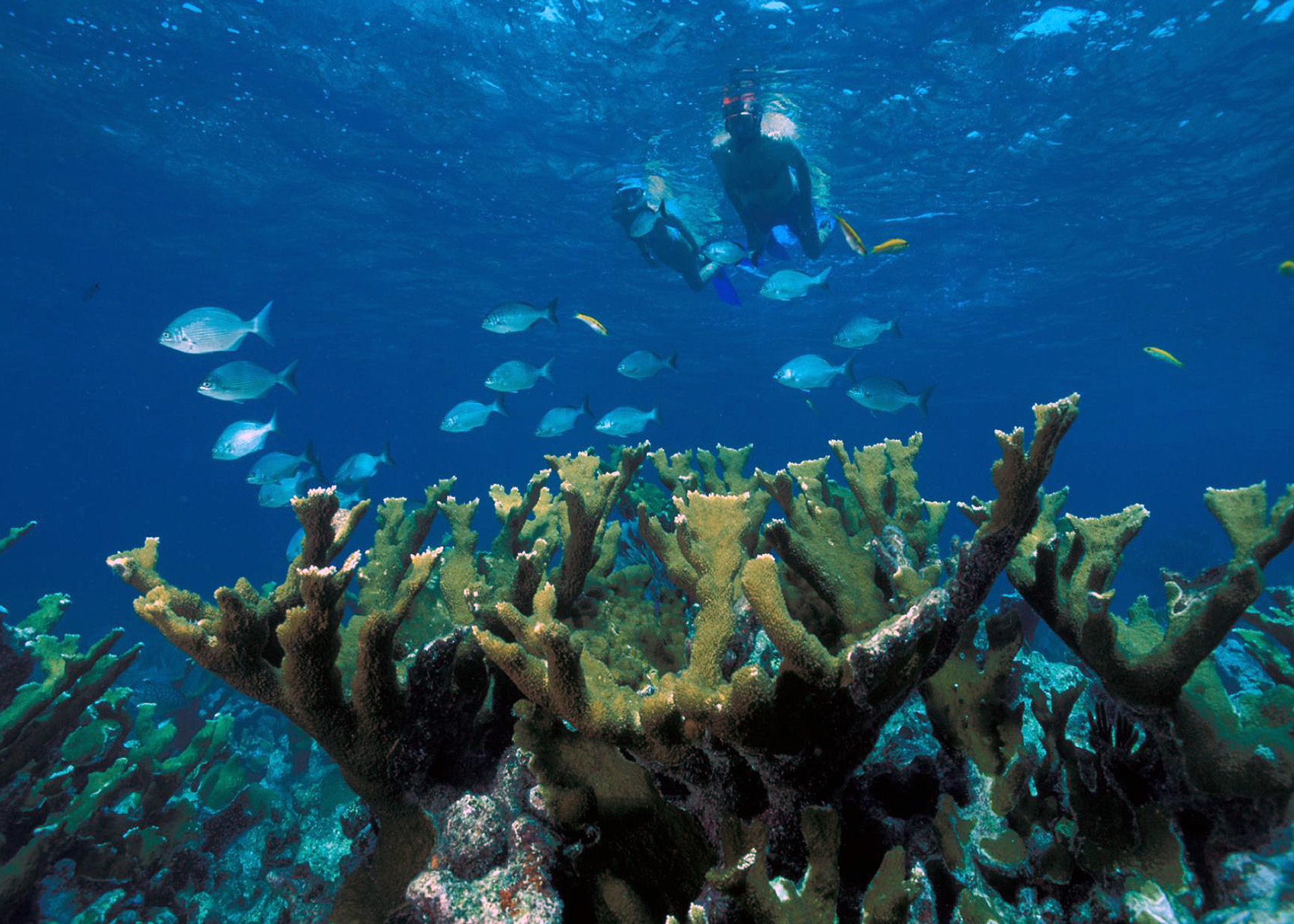
Elkhorn coral provide important reef-building services.

=== Reef-building service ===
Like the foundation of a house, Elkhorn coral support coral reef communities. Their interwoven lattice-like branches create a variety of habitats varying in topography, which in turn, support diverse fish populations. These habitats support fish nurseries and protect fish from predators, increasing reef diversity. This elevated diversity makes the reefs more appealing to tourists, thereby increasing their economic value.

=== Storm protection ===
Elkhorn coral provide insulation from storms to beaches and reefs. Their thick branches absorb the energy of storm waves, in turn, dissipating the force that crashes into beach shorelines. With less force, beachfront properties experience less damage, reducing the financial demand needed to restore the homes and livelihoods of many.

== Life history ==
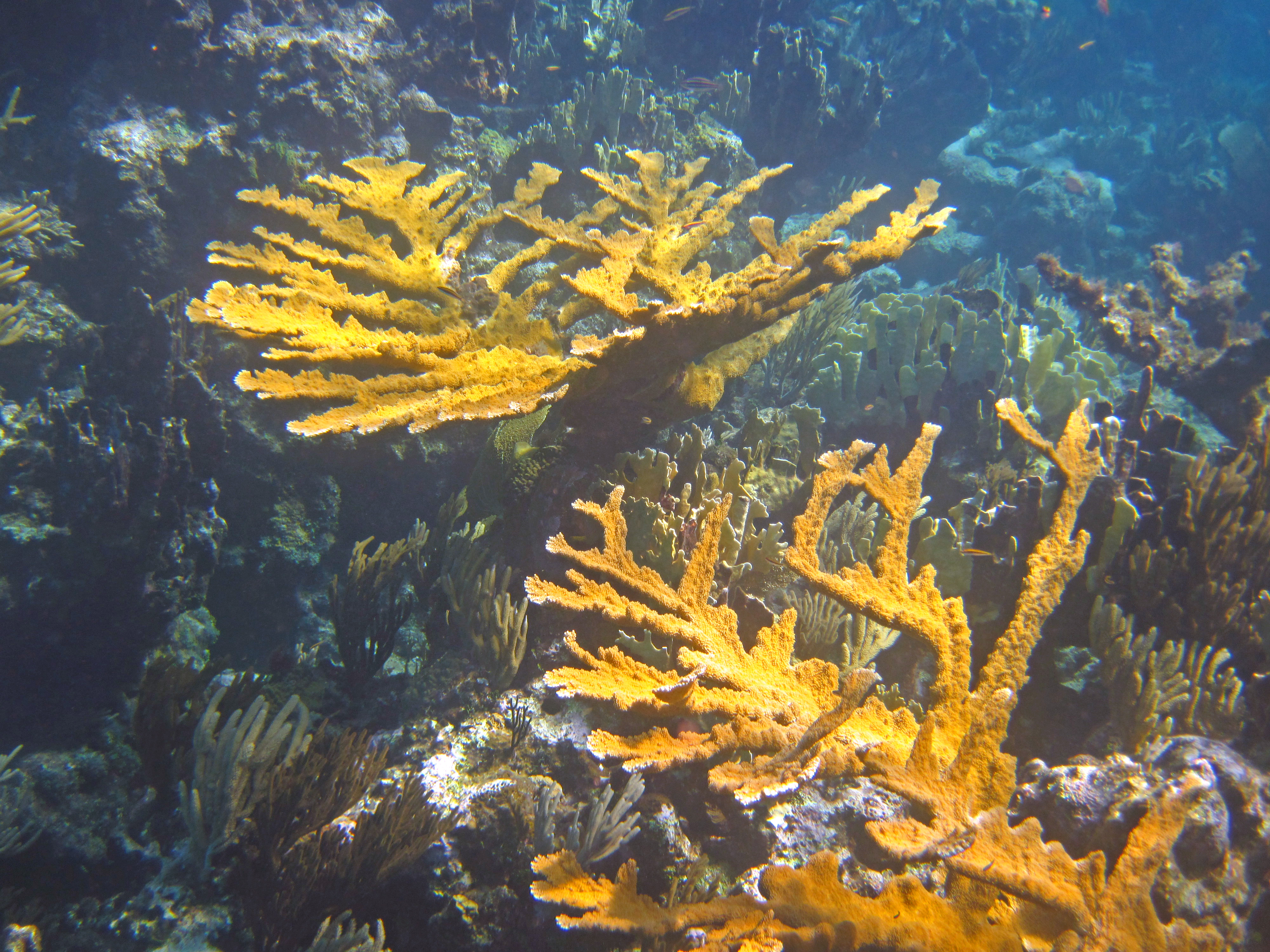
Mature Elkhorn coral individuals

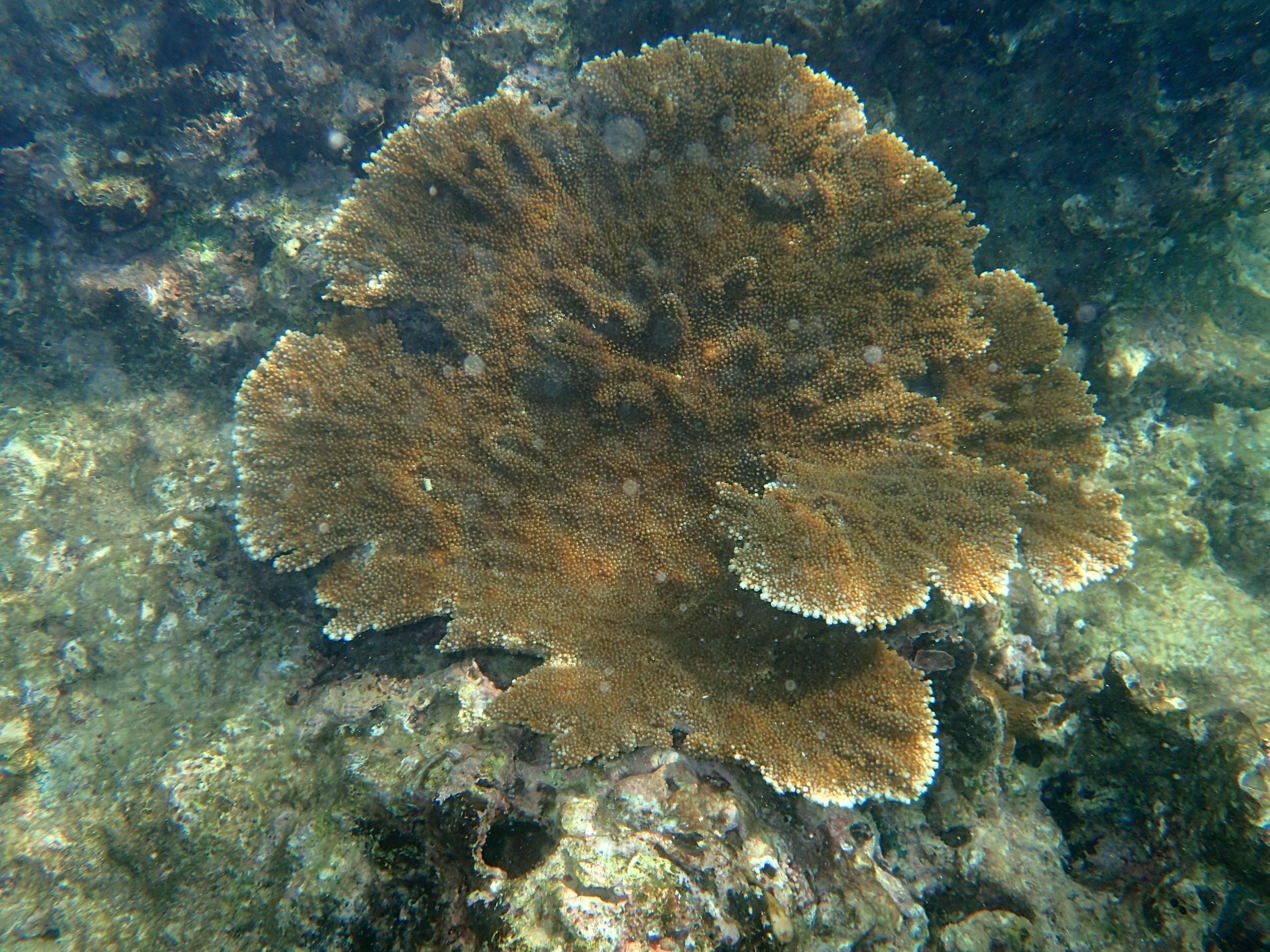
Young Elkhorn coral individual

=== Age and growth ===
Elkhorn coral colonies live for centuries. These colonies grow 5–10 cm (2–4 inches) each year, reaching maximum size in 10 to 12 years. Healthy Elkhorn coral can grow up to 13 cm (5 inches) in branch length a year, making them one of the fastest growing coral species. Elkhorn coral can span a diameter of 4 m (12 feet) wide and 2 m (6 feet) tall. Under stressful conditions, Elkhorn coral colonies and fragment growth slow down substantially. For example, the Fortuna Reefer Vessel grounding site showed no measurable growth over the last ten years due to stress. Elkhorn coral create thick, interlocking groups known as thickets. Thickets provide shelter to other marine life such as fish, crustaceans, and marine invertebrates, and consist of many identical polyps that have grown together. These dense groups provide protection to shorelines against large waves and storms.

=== Reproductive biology ===
==== Sexual reproduction ====
The Elkhorn coral is a simultaneous hermaphrodite, meaning that in each coral colony both egg and sperm are produced. Despite this, self-fertilization usually does not occur. In order for successful fertilization to take place, two genetically distinct parents are needed. Successful reproduction rates are low in Elkhorn coral which limit the growth of new colonies. The probability of successful reproduction rates are low in Elkhorn coral because only about 50% of Elkhorn corals are genetically unique individuals. The Elkhorn coral reproduction cycle occurs once per year, after a full moon in the late summer, during the months of either July, August, or September. The gametes are released for only a few nights by broadcast spawning eggs and sperm into a water column. Once fertilized, the eggs develop into larvae that settle on hard surfaces and begin the growth of a new colony.

==== Asexual reproduction ====
Most commonly, Elkhorn coral reproduce asexually, their most common type of reproduction. During storms, strong waves, or ship disturbances, fragments of coral break off and are transported to other areas where new colonies can begin. The new colonies are genetically identical to their parent colonies, while sexual reproduction results in new genotypes. Also, as opposed to sexual reproduction, fragmentation can occur at any time of the year.

=== Historical and present range ===
Quantitative data available on the distribution and abundance of Elkhorn coral is scarce. Present locations of the Elkhorn coral include the southern coasts of Florida and the northern regions of the Gulf of Mexico. Elkhorn coral are also located in the Bay Islands of Honduras.

==== Critical habitat ====
There are four critical habitats for the elkhorn coral that are essential to the conservation of this species. The specific regions designated and protected by the Endangered Species Act as critical habitats include regions in Florida (1,329 square miles of marine habitat), Puerto Rico (3,582 square miles of marine habitat), St. John and St. Thomas (121 square miles of marine habitat), and the St. Croix area (126 square miles of marine habitat).

=== Historical and present population size ===
Elkhorn coral populations once dominated the southeastern region of the Northern hemisphere. Due to bleaching events, disease, and climate change, Elkhorn population has significantly decreased since the 1980s. In total, 80–98% of the Caribbean coral reef population has been lost. A longitudinal study done from 2005 to 2015 shows that the Elkhorn coral population had a proportional decline of 0.4–0.7 times in colony density across the entirety of its occupied range. This decline indicates that despite conservation efforts, the population is still decreasing. Overall, there are no concrete estimates of current or historical population sizes due to technological limitations.

=== Life history limitations ===
Several factors limit the amount of information regarding the life history of Elkhorn coral. These factors include the necessity for additional tools to assess future population changes, sexual reproduction, and environmental disturbances.

== Endangered Species Act listing ==
=== Elkhorn coral decline ===
In Endangered Species Act (ESA) listings, Elkhorn coral is listed alongside Staghorn coral, A. cervicornia, because the corals share the same genus. While recognized as two separate species in scientific literature, they inhabit similar ranges and share many of the same characteristics.

Since the 1980s, Elkhorn coral populations have rapidly declined by an estimated 97%. Elkhorn coral was initially recognized as a candidate for ESA listing in June 1991, but was removed from the list of candidates in 1997 for a lack of sufficient evidence in regard to their status and threats. However, they were re-added to this list in 1999 due to concrete evidence of their population decline. In April 2004, they were transferred from the candidate species list to the species of concern list.

=== Petition to list Elkhorn coral ===
In 2004, the National Marine Fisheries Service (NMFS) received a petition to list the Elkhorn coral, Staghorn coral, and a hybrid species, A. prolifera, as either threatened or endangered. The NMFS determined that the petition contained substantial information and established the Atlantic Acropora Biological Review Team (BRT) to review the status of these coral species. The BRT included a diverse group of experts from many different scientific fields, including coral conservationists. The BRT published a status review on March 3, 2005, which summarized the relevant, published literature on these species, comments from the public, and an assessment regarding current conservation efforts.

=== ESA listing as threatened ===
The BRT's status review concluded that the ESA should list the Elkhorn coral as a threatened species, given the importance of its ecosystem contributions and the severity of the numerous threats impacting the species. As a formerly abundant species, its high growth rate allowed it to keep up with sea level changes. The branching morphology created homes and protection for many other reef organisms. Since its decline, no other coral species has been able to fulfill these ecosystem functions. As mentioned, the species faces many threats, which include but are not limited to disease, temperature-induced bleaching, and physical damage from hurricanes. The BRT determined that Elkhorn coral was not at risk for extinction, but could become so in the foreseeable future because its population sizes were low and the severity of threats was predicted to increase.

After reviewing the BRT's 2005 status report, the NMFS published a final rule on the status of Elkhorn coral on May 9, 2006. Effective June 8, 2006, the species was listed as threatened under the Endangered Species Act of 1973.

=== Re-classification review ===
In 2012, there was discussion surrounding the status of Elkhorn coral and whether it should be reclassified from threatened to endangered. The reasoning behind this proposed change was the continued population decline since the time of the ESA listing in 2006 as well as evidence of recruitment failure in several populations. The persisting population decline was potentially attributable to several increasing threats such as ocean acidification and levels of thermal stress.

However, many members of the scientific community and the public expressed disagreement with this proposed reclassification. Several comments referenced instances of increasing abundance and recovering populations with some citing population and genetic diversity statistics as well as population models. Many people argued that there had been significant advances in active restoration projects, and they feared that listing this coral as endangered would possibly disrupt and discourage the ongoing conservation efforts.

In September 2014, the NMFS published a final rule on the listing status of 65 reef-building coral species. This included a re-evaluation of the status of Elkhorn coral. The coral was kept listed as threatened due to concerns from the public that listing it as endangered might impact the ongoing restoration projects as people may see them as less worthwhile.

== Current threats ==
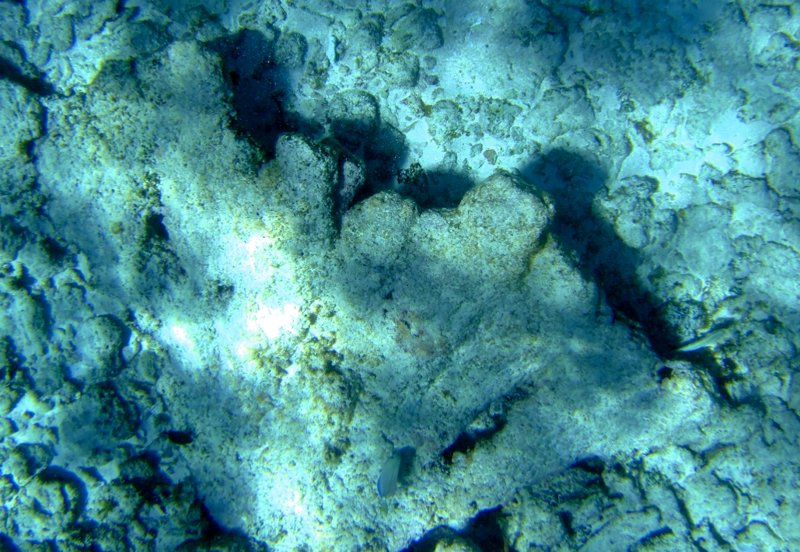
Deceased Elkhorn coral

=== Global stressors ===
Elkhorn coral face many global threats such as climate change, ocean acidification, and overfishing.

==== Climate change ====
Like other species, Elkhorn coral are threatened by climate change. Climate change refers to the general warming of earth's average temperature caused by carbon emissions. Warmer atmospheric temperatures incidentally also increase water temperature. As mentioned, Elkhorn coral have special algae called zooxanthellae, living on their tissues, which provide many benefits. However, when water temperatures warm, Elkhorn coral expel their zooxanthellae. Without their zooxanthellae, Elkhorn coral first lose their prime oxygen source, then color, and then usually die. In addition, climate change increases the severity and prevalence of storms, which can decimate Elkhorn coral populations.

==== Ocean acidification ====
Elkhorn coral are also threatened by ocean acidification, which lowers seawater pH and reduces carbonate ion availability—impairing the coral's calcium-carbonate skeleton formation. Ocean acidification refers to the growing acidity of marine water caused by the increasing presence of dissolved carbon dioxide, a result of carbon emissions. The skeleton of Elkhorn coral is made of calcium carbonate. Carbon dioxide forms chemical bonds with water and, through chemical reactions, remove carbonate ions that the corals need to make calcium carbonate. With fewer carbonate ions, the coral skeletons are weaker and break easier.

==== Overfishing ====
Like many corals, overfishing affects Elkhorn coral by reducing fish populations that feed on harmful macroalgae. Macroalgae damage Elkhorn coral by producing toxic chemicals and by decreasing the nearby available oxygen. Macroalgae can further harm Elkhorn coral by facilitating pathogen growth. Also, macroalgae reduce the amount of suitable areas where Elkhorn coral larvae attach, reducing the ability for Elkhorn reefs to recover.

=== Local stressors ===
Local water pollution, also known as wastewater, negatively impacts Elkhorn coral by increasing the prevalence of white pox disease, the abundance of macroalgae, and by increasing water cloudiness.

Elkhorn coral threatened by disease

==== White pox disease ====
Human pathogens found in untreated wastewater are especially harmful to Elkhorn coral. Serra marcescens, commonly called white pox disease, is extremely lethal and contagious. The disease first causes the coral to emit a foul smelling mucus, followed by the formation of thick lesions, which then fall off, removing coral tissue. These lesions grow quickly, and can grow up to 10.5 cm^{2} per day, causing tissue loss of 2.5 cm^{2} per day. This disease helped put the Elkhorn coral on the endangered species list in 2006 after a case of Serra marcescens wiped out 75% of the Caribbean corals in 2005.

==== Nutrient growth – algae growth ====
Untreated wastewater also contains high levels of nutrients, which increase macroalgae growth. As mentioned above, this macroalgae growth is detrimental to Elkhorn survival.

==== Turbidity – water cloudiness ====
Another stressor is an increase in water turbidity. This turbidity increase can result from a myriad of issues like untreated wastewater and beach erosion activities. Elkhorn coral live within very shallow regions, enabling their photosynthetic zooxanthellae to receive much light. When waters become turbid, or cloudy, access to this light is impeded. With less available light, less photosynthesis occurs, and thus zooxanthellae produce less oxygen. As stated earlier, most of the oxygen coral receive is from their zooxanthellae, so without this oxygen, Elkhorn coral can quickly suffocate and die.

All of these stressors independently weaken corals. Collectively they reduce the chance that corals have of surviving any single stressor.

== Conservation efforts ==
=== Existing efforts prior to listing ===
Prior to the ESA listing in 2006, there were no regulatory mechanisms in place to protect Elkhorn coral. Some documentation with regulations existed; however, no documents specifically mentioned by name the Elkhorn coral or any other Acropora corals.

Most of the existing regulation was intended to protect corals against physical impacts incurred through fishing gear, anchoring, and vessel grounding. Florida law protects Scleractinia corals as well as Milleporina corals from collection, commercial exploitation, and direct physical damage. Puerto Rico also established similar laws protecting corals and encouraging conservation. In 2001, the National Park Service established two national monuments – the Virgin Islands Coral Reef and the Buck Island Reef National Monument. The creation of these two monuments established thousands of acres of non-extractive zones.

While the United States had some policy in place before the listing, many other nations did not. Given that the range of the Elkhorn coral extends along the coasts of several different countries, the inconsistency in policy presented an issue. The official listing of Elkhorn coral allowed for the establishment of more specific protection.

=== Conservation goals ===
The NMFS published a recovery plan in March 2015, which clearly outlined the conservation goals and efforts for Elkhorn coral. This document indicated that the main goals are to increase the abundance of this species and protect the genetic diversity throughout its entire range.

This latter goal is especially important for conservation. Elkhorn coral are capable of both sexual and asexual reproduction; however, asexual reproduction is more common, which has resulted in only about 50% of Elkhorn being genetic individuals. The lack of genetic variation makes the species more susceptible to threats and is, therefore, an important focus for conservation.

=== Restoration projects ===
Most of the ongoing restoration projects for Elkhorn coral involve the creation of protected areas, which are intended to promote reproduction and growth by minimizing some of the threats to the species.

On November 26, 2008, the NMFS issued a final rule, effective December 26, 2008, which designated 2,959 square miles (7,664 sq km) as critical habitat for Elkhorn coral. The habitat described is composed of four different areas, which include the coasts surrounding Florida, Puerto Rico, the St. John and St. Thomas area, and St. Croix. These areas were specifically chosen because they contain the surface features which are necessary for the conservation of Elkhorn. In order to increase the amount of successful sexual and asexual reproduction events, the species require hard surfaces within water depths ranging from the mean high water line to about 30 meters.

In 2009, the United States government enacted the American Recovery and Reinvestment Act, which provided funding for coral conservation through the National Oceanic and Atmospheric Administration (NOAA) department. This funding allowed for the creation of a network of coral nurseries throughout the waters off the coast of southern Florida and the U.S. Virgin Islands for the recovery of Elkhorn coral. The nurseries have proven helpful in conducting genetic research in the facilitation of overall reef growth and restoration.

=== Rehabilitation ===
Even 14 years after being listed as threatened, the Elkhorn coral remains so. This failure is in part due to the time and energy-intensive procedures that were previously required to rehabilitate Elkhorn coral reefs. These procedures needed coral to be grown for months to years in nurseries before being planted in the ocean. However, new research suggests that Elkhorn coral can be planted in the ocean after just two weeks of being raised in a nursery. This decrease in nursery time makes it approximately 30 times cheaper to rear Elkhorn coral now. This cost reduction makes it financially easier for nations to restore their reefs.
