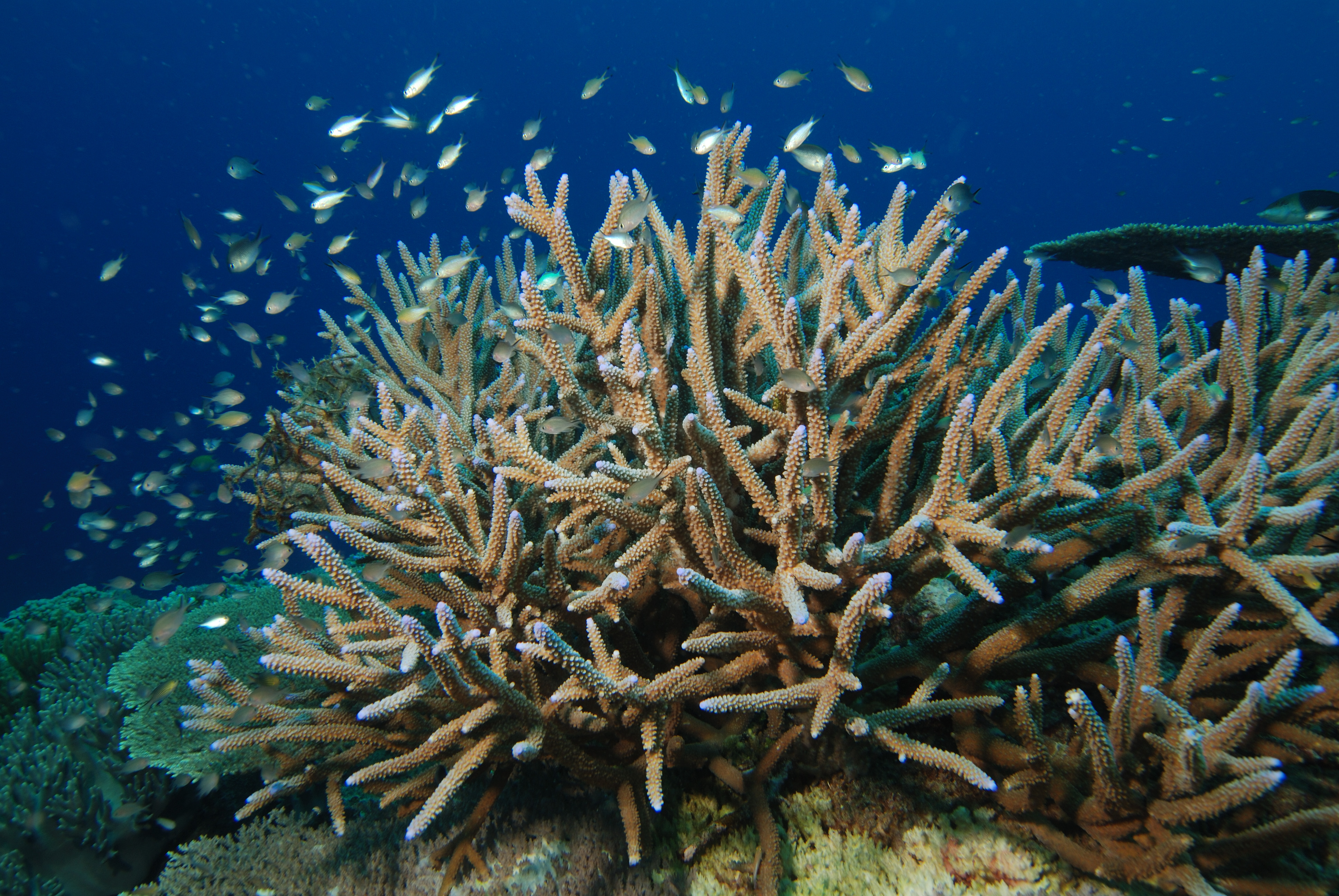

Conservation status
- Critically Endangered (IUCN 3.1)

Scientific classification
- Kingdom: Animalia
- Phylum: Cnidaria
- Subphylum: Anthozoa
- Class: Hexacorallia
- Order: Scleractinia
- Family: Acroporidae
- Genus: Acropora
- Species: A. cervicornis

Binomial name
- Acropora cervicornis (Lamarck, 1816)

Synonyms
- List: Acropora attenuata (Brook, 1893); Acropora muricata cervicornis (Lamarck, 1816); Isopora muricata cervicornis (Lamarck, 1816); Madrepora muricata cervicornis Lamarck, 1816; Madrepora attenuata Brook, 1893; Madrepora cervicornis Lamarck, 1816

= Staghorn coral =

Staghorn coral Temporal range: Messinian - recent

Species of coral

The staghorn coral (Acropora cervicornis) is a branching, stony coral, within the Order Scleractinia. It is characterized by thick, upright branches which can grow in excess of 2 meters (6.5 ft) in height and resemble the antlers of a stag, hence the name, Staghorn. It grows within various areas of a reef but is most commonly found within shallow fore and back reefs, as well as patch reefs, where water depths rarely exceed 20 meters (65 ft). Staghorn corals can exhibit very fast growth, adding up to 5 cm (~2 in) in new skeleton for every 1 cm of existing skeleton each year, making them one of the fastest growing fringe coral species in the Western Atlantic. Due to this fast growth, Acropora cervicornis, serve as one of the most important reef building corals, functioning as marine nurseries for juvenile fish, buffer zones for erosion and storms, and center points of biodiversity in the Western Atlantic.

Up until the late 1970s, much of the fore reef zones within the Atlantic around the coasts of Southern Florida and the Caribbean Islands were covered with vast, dense colonies of Staghorn coral consisting largely of single-species stands; however, a combination of white-band disease and various anthropogenic factors have reduced this coral coverage by over 95% in some areas.

As of 2006, staghorn coral is listed as Critically Endangered under the International Union for Conservation of Nature and are federally designated as a threatened species under the Endangered Species Act of 1973. Due to the 2023 marine heatwave, staghorn corals are functionally extinct within Florida's Coral Reef.

== Species overview ==
=== Geographic location ===
Staghorn coral is found throughout the Western Atlantic Ocean, from the Florida Keys and the Bahamas, to the coasts of the various Caribbean islands. It occurs in the western Gulf of Mexico, but is absent from U.S. waters in the Gulf of Mexico, as well as Bermuda and the west coast of South America; the northern limit of this species is Palm Beach County, Florida, where only small populations have been documented

=== Habitat ===
Staghorn coral is most commonly found within 20 meters (65 ft) of the water's surface, in clear, non-turbid environments consistent with fore, back and patch reefs in the Western Atlantic Ocean. In this environment, water temperatures typically range anywhere from 66 to 80 degrees Fahrenheit (19 - 27 degrees Celsius) with salinity ranging from 33 to 37 ppt (parts per thousand).

=== Structure ===
The skeleton of the Staghorn coral is made up of a specific type of calcium carbonate known as aragonite. This substance is secreted slowly by specialized calicoblastic cells, positioned in the layer directly above the coral skeleton. Over time, these calcium carbonate secretions build on one another, eventually creating large aragonite coral structures and the foundations of the world's coral reefs.

The Staghorn coral typically grows large, thick stems called "branches", which can range anywhere from 1 to 3 inches in width. These branches grow in close proximity to one another, and sometimes resemble the antlers of a stag, hence its common name, Staghorn. A fully grown and healthy colony could have potential hundreds of these branches, and achieve sizes up to and exceeding 2 meters (6.5 ft) in both height and width.

The colour of stony corals is largely dependent on the symbiotic zooxanthellae that lives within the corals tissue, and varies widely depending on the species and environment in which it lives. When it comes to the Staghorn coral specifically, tissue color can vary from light brown and beige to green, blue or purple.

=== Symbiosis ===
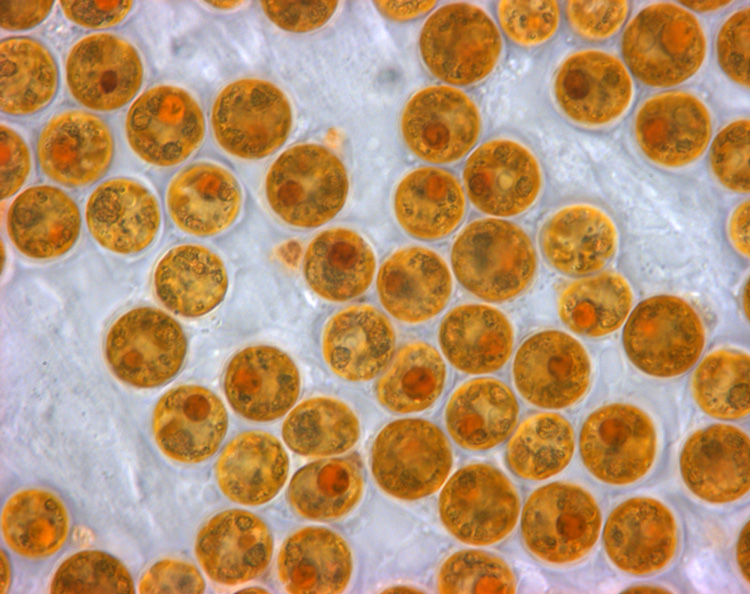
Symbiotic dinoflagellates of the genus Symbiodinium which reside in the tissue of living coral species.

Throughout millions of years of evolution, stony corals have formed a symbiotic relationship with 8 phylogenetic clades of dinoflagellate algae within the genus of Symbiodinium (also known as zooxanthellae). This symbiotic relationship has resulted in the incorporation of specialized dinoflagellates into the tissue of various coral species, including those of the Acropora genus like Acropora cervicornis (Staghorn coral).

Over time, these dinoflagellates have lost their flagella and become immobile and dependent on the coral as a host for safety and a source of carbon dioxide. At the same time, the coral has become dependent on the dinoflagellates for up to 90% of their total nutritional requirements, which includes various lipids, amino acids, and sugars as well as a source of oxygenation and waste removal. To fulfill the needs of the coral host, the zooxanthellae have become extremely densely packed within the coral tissue, in some cases up to and exceeding 1 million individual cells per centimeter squared of coral area.

This relationship has allowed corals to exist in relatively nutrient poor environments for millions of years, as almost all nutrients are recycled with very little waste.

=== Diet ===
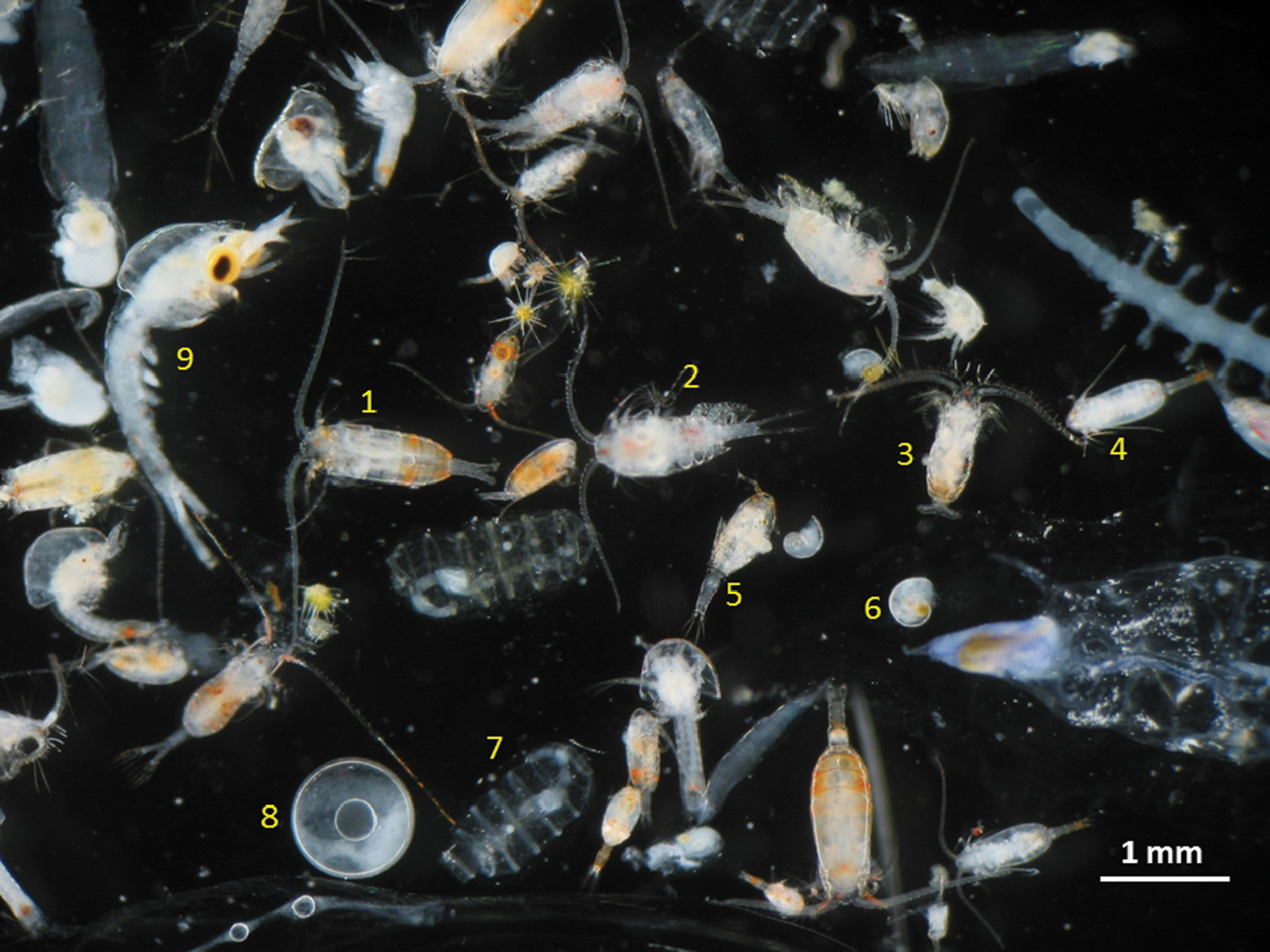
Various species of Zooplankton. Coral are able to feed on these microscopic organisms using their feeding tentacles and mouths.

Like the vast majority of coral species, Staghorn coral are both autotrophic and heterotrophic, meaning they have two main methods of acquiring the nutrients needed to sustain their growth and continued survival.

The first and most important method is autotrophic and comes from the photosynthetic symbiotic zooxanthellae that inhabit the tissue of the Staghorn. This method accounts for up to 90% of their total nutritional requirements.

The second method is heterotrophic and involves the ingestion of organisms from the polyp itself, where each individual polyp within the colony is capable of heterotrophy. This is the most common during night when photosynthesis is restricted and micro-organisms like zooplankton are feeding. Using their long feeding tentacles, polyps are able to catch passing food, stunning it with their stinging nematocysts to prevent escape, eventually orientating it towards the mouth at the center for digestion.

The contribution of nutrients gained from heterotrophy is poorly understood, however, it is thought that in stony corals, of which Staghorn is one, that it may account for anywhere from 0 to 66% of carbon fixation.

== Reproduction ==
There are two methods by which Staghorn corals can produce, asexually and sexually.

=== Asexual reproduction ===
Asexual reproduction most typically involves budding and fragmentation.

Budding is the process by which a single coral colony grows, and consists of two types of polyp budding. The first, known as intra-tentacular budding, is the formation of new polyps from the internal splitting of existing ones. The second, called extra-tentacular budding, is the formation of new polyps from tissue where none already exist, this includes the space around or between existing polyps. Budding produces genetically identical polyps to the ones that currently exist in the colony, meaning that all polyps in a colony are clones of each other.

Fragmentation is the process by which an entire coral colony gives rise to one or more new ones. This involves the breaking off of branches from existing Staghorn coral colonies and their subsequent implantation and growth on nearby substrates. In Staghorn corals, much like other stony corals, this appears to be the most common mode of reproduction and can result in a single coral giving rise to many new colonies, or sometimes entirely new coral reefs. Fragmentation can occur at anytime, and is usually the result of turbid flow from storms, nearby ships, dredging, or any disturbances in the water which would cause the breakage and successive replantation of coral branches.

Due to the nature of fragmentation, all new colonies are genetic clones of the original which can result in entire reefs of Staghorn coral being genetically identical, potentially rendering them more susceptible to disease or bleaching.

=== Sexual reproduction ===
Like the majority of stony coral species within the genus Acropora, Staghorn coral is a simultaneous hermaphrodite, meaning it produces both female and male gametes within each individual polyp. Although they technically have the ability to self-fertilize, research suggests that single colonies are either completely or partially self-sterile, therefore, for successful reproduction of coral planula, two distinct colonies or parents are needed.

Release of eggs and sperm are synchronized in a single event called broadcasting. This increases the success of fertilization and production of fertile offspring. Staghorn coral spawning is typically restricted to late summer, in the months of July and August and occurs several days following a full moon. The mechanism by which these corals choose a spawn day is still unknown, however, it is almost certainly influenced by a multitude of factors including water temperature, the lunar cycle, wave action and tidal periods.

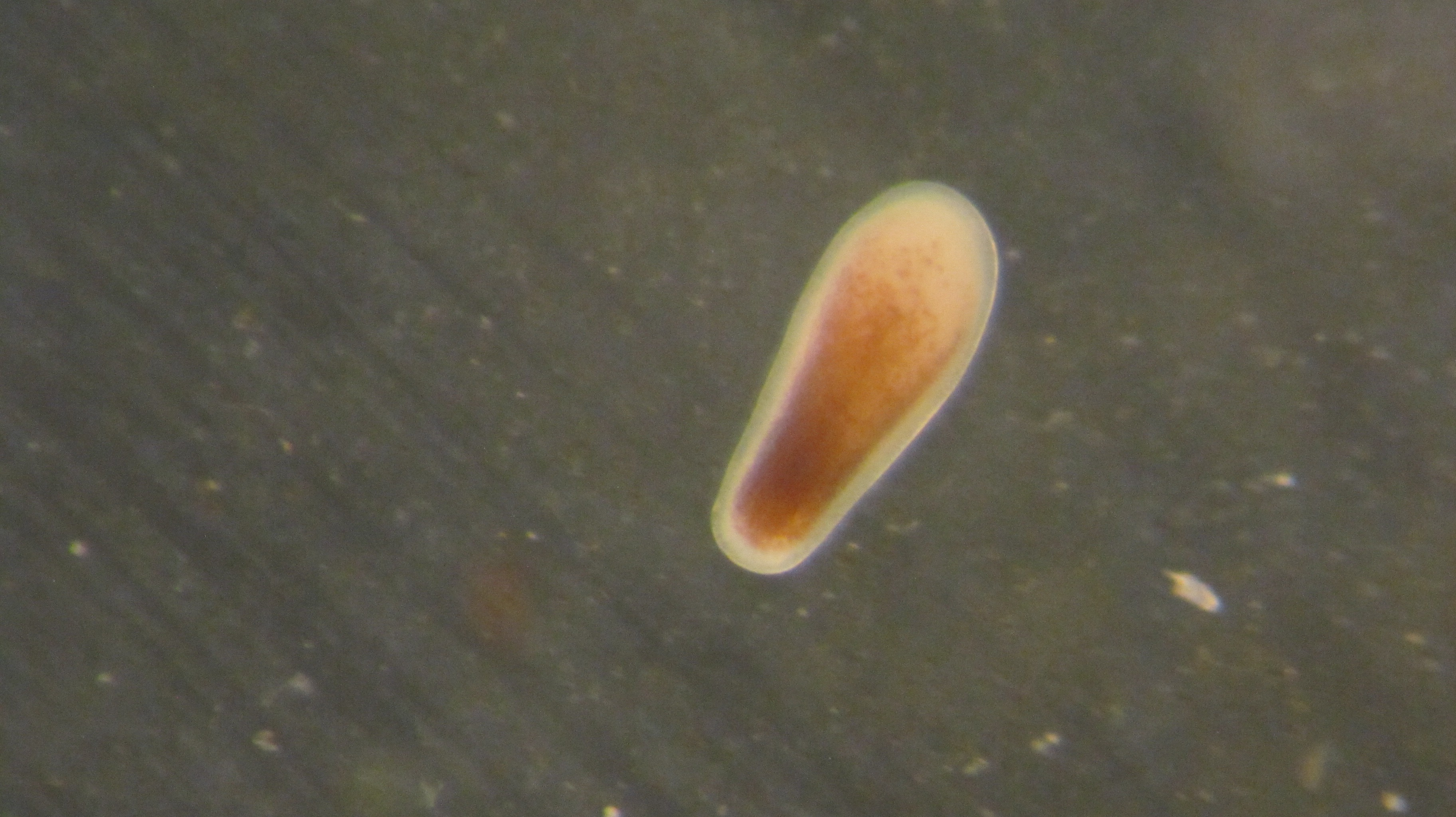
An example of a coral planula of the genus Leptoseris.

=== Coral planula ===
The method by which coral planula choose a spot on the reef to attach to is far more complex than previously thought. Instead of drifting through the water aimlessly and attaching at a random point, coral planula have developed various key adaptations to aid in their search for the perfect home. These include basic sensory abilities to avoid damaging UV radiation, as well as the ability to detect tides, water pressure, and even hear and smell environmental phenomena on nearby coral reefs. All of this together allows for the successful navigation of coral planula to nearby reefs, and the selection of a spot while avoiding harmful UV radiation, sedimentation and shading, giving the planula the best chance at survival.

== Threats ==
=== Overfishing ===
Overfishing is one of the biggest threats to coral reefs not only in the Caribbean and Western Atlantic where the Staghorn inhabits, but on many coral reefs around the world. The effects of overfishing are wide ranging, and can lead to an overgrowth of sponges by as much as 25% as their predators are systematically fished out and removed from the ecosystem. As sponges grow uninhibited, they outcompete, smother and prevent the settlement of coral planula as they become the dominant habitat forming organisms on the reef.

=== Disease ===
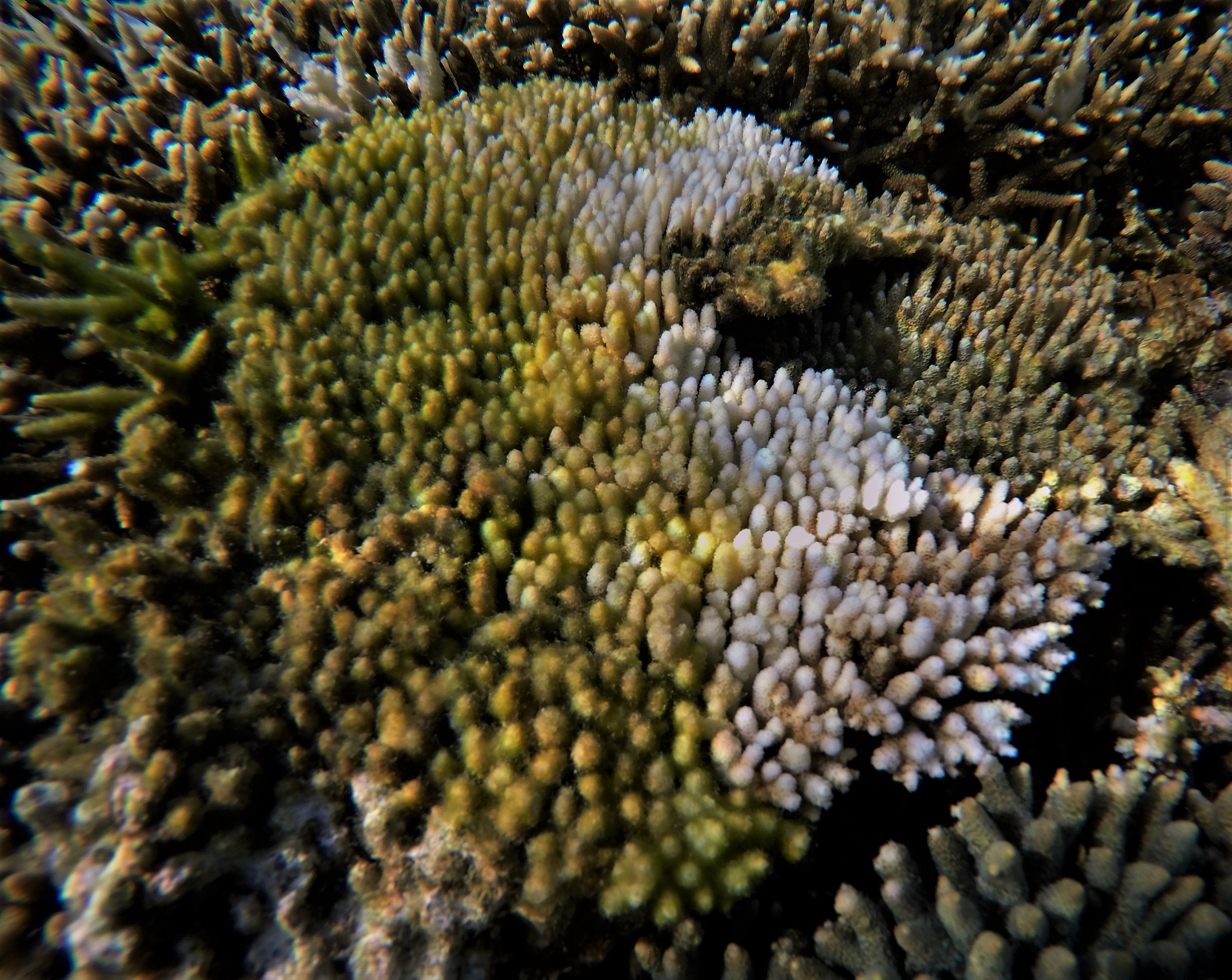
White-band disease is one of the biggest threats to the continued survival of Staghorn coral.

Bacterial infections also pose a great risk to Staghorn corals, as well as the closely related Elkhorn corals, both of which are essential reef building corals in the Western Atlantic and Caribbean, with white-band disease posing by far the greatest risk. This disease is host specific, meaning it only affects certain species of coral, the Staghorn among them. First observed in 1979, this disease is often credited with the massive population decline of shallow reef building corals, like the Staghorn and Elkhorn, contributing to as much as 95% of their decline in the past 30 years.

White-band disease is the result of potentially many very infectious bacterial pathogens, including some from the genus Vibrio, and can be transmitted via direct contact between coral colonies, through the water column into damaged tissues, and even by certain species of invertebrates, like the coral eating snail, Coralliophila abbreviata. It is characterized by thick lesions in the coral tissue that form distinctive white bands slowly spreading from the bottom of a branch to the top, leaving behind nothing but bare coral skeleton as the disease progresses. In Staghorn coral, tissue necrosis can spread up to 4 cm (40 mm) on branches daily, resulting in a total loss of tissue coverage of about 21 cm² (2100 mm²) per day. Once infected, a Staghorn colony loses on average 84% of its total tissue coverage, going from around 96% before infection, to about 12% after infection completion, with a mortality rate of approximately 28%.

=== Climate change ===
Ocean temperature has increased by approximately 1.3 °F from 1900 to 2019. This increase in temperature has accelerated over the past decade, resulting in approximately 4.5 times greater ocean warming than the previous 100 years. Ocean warming affects all marine species, perhaps none more than stony corals, like the Staghorn. Stony corals are extremely sensitive to temperature fluctuations and as ocean temperatures rise, corals become more susceptible to bleaching events. These events occur where the photosynthetic dinoflagellates (zooxanthellae) living symbiotically in the coral tissues are expelled, leaving the coral completely white and without its main nutrient source. In this state, coral is under its highest stress, and becomes more likely to contract disease, or starve, increasing its chance of mortality. If temperatures return to normal levels, the coral is able to reintegrate the zooxanthellae back into its tissues, however, as ocean warming events become more common, as a result of climate change, bleached corals are less likely to recover completely.

== Listing history ==
=== Candidate identification ===
On June 11, 1991, both Staghorn and Elkhorn coral were first identified as candidates for reclassification under the Endangered Species Act of 1973 (ESA). On December 18, 1997, both species were removed as candidates for listing due to the unavailability of evidence on their biological status or threats. On June 23, 1999, both species were again added to the candidates list for potential inclusion for listing under the ESA, as new evidence emerged of large scale population decline as compared to historic levels.

=== Petition to list ===
On March 4, 2004, the Center for Biological Diversity petitioned the US National Marine Fisheries Service (NMFS) to list Elkhorn (A. palmata), Staghorn (A. cervicornis), and fused-Staghorn (A. prolifera) coral as either threatened or endangered under the Endangered Species Act of 1973 (ESA). On June 23, 2004, NOAA Fisheries and the National Marine Fisheries Service (NMFS) found that listing these species may be warranted and initiated a formal review of their biological status by convening the Atlantic Acropora Biological Review Team to summarize the best scientific and commercial data available in the status review report.

=== Listing ===
On May 9, 2005, the National Marine Fisheries Service (NMFS) determined that sufficient evidence existed to reclassify both the Staghorn (A. cervicornis), and the closely related Elkhorn (A. palmata), as threatened under the Endangered Species Act of 1973 (ESA). They also found that fused-Staghorn coral doesn't meet the criteria for listing, as it is identified as a hybrid and therefore doesn't fall under the ESA's definition of a distinct species. In 2006, the Staghorn coral, along with the closely related Elkhorn coral, was officially listed as a threatened species under the Endangered Species Act of 1973 (ESA). The US National Marine Fisheries Service (NMFS) officially designated critical habitat for Elkhorn and Staghorn corals in 2008.

=== Listing review ===
In December 2012, the National Marine Fisheries Service (NMFS) once more suggested reclassifying the Elkhorn and Staghorn corals as endangered. However, by September 2014, they determined that both coral species would continue to be listed as threatened.

== Conservation ==
=== Goals ===
On March 6, 2015, the National Marine Fisheries Service (NMFS) alongside the National Oceanic and Atmospheric Administration (NOAA) published a recovery plan for both the Staghorn and Elkhorn coral species. The main purpose of this plan was to rebuild the population and ensure its long-term viability with the ultimate goal of removal from the Endangered Species Act of 1973 (ESA). To achieve this removal, goals were put into place, including increasing the abundance of genetic diversity among both species throughout their geographical range, while at the same time identifying, reducing and/or eliminating threats to their survival, through both research and monitoring practices. A successful recovery plan for Staghorn coral must ensure populations increase to a size large enough to include many reproductively active colonies, with branches thick enough to provide ecosystem function and maintain genetic diversity. This recovery plan sought to manage both local and global threats, while at the same time acknowledging certain threats to Staghorn coral cannot be directly managed, like disease or climate change. Population enhancement, through habitat restoration and population restocking as well as actions at the ecosystem level to improve community functioning like herbivory, and successful coral recruitment, were also outlined in the recovery plan as essential to the long term conservation goals of the Staghorn coral.

=== Protected areas ===
On December 26, 2008, the National Marine Fisheries Service (NMFS) alongside the National Oceanic and Atmospheric Administration (NOAA) officially designated large parts of the Caribbean as critical habitat for both Staghorn and Elkhorn coral. The goal of this designation was to address the key conservation objective when it came to the Staghorn coral, that is, to facilitate an increase in reproduction, both sexually and asexually.

This critical habitat comprised four specific areas: Florida, of which approximately 1,329 square miles (3,442 sq km) of marine habitat was designated critical; Puerto Rico, of which approximately 1,383 square miles (3,582 sq km) of marine habitat was designated critical; St Thomas - Saint John in the U.S Virgin Islands, of which approximately 121 square miles (313 sq km) of marine habitat was designated critical; and finally, St. Croix in the U.S Virgin Islands, of which approximately 126 square miles (326 sq km) of marine habitat was designated critical. Within this area, one military installation comprising approximately 5.5 square miles (14.3 sq km) of area was exempted due to national security interests.

In order for successful attachment of coral larvae, areas with no sediment or algae cover and only exposed rock or dead coral skeleton are needed, the four areas listed above best fit this description and were therefore designated in this rule as the best possible habitat for successful Staghorn coral reproduction.

=== Restoration ===
In 2007, the Coral Restoration Foundation in conjunction with the NOAA Recovery Plan (NRP) began the artificial restoration of Staghorn coral off the coast of the Florida Keys. Staghorn coral colonies were grown and cultivated in an offshore nursery, fixed on discs or hung from fishing lines, until they achieved 30 cm in diameter before being planted in natural coral reefs off the coast of Florida. Between 2007 and 2013, thousands of Staghorn colonies were planted, and survivorship remained high in the first few years, ranging between 23% and 72%. However, after five years, a decline in coral survivorship became evident, with survival rates of planted Staghorn colonies falling below 10%.

== Gallery ==
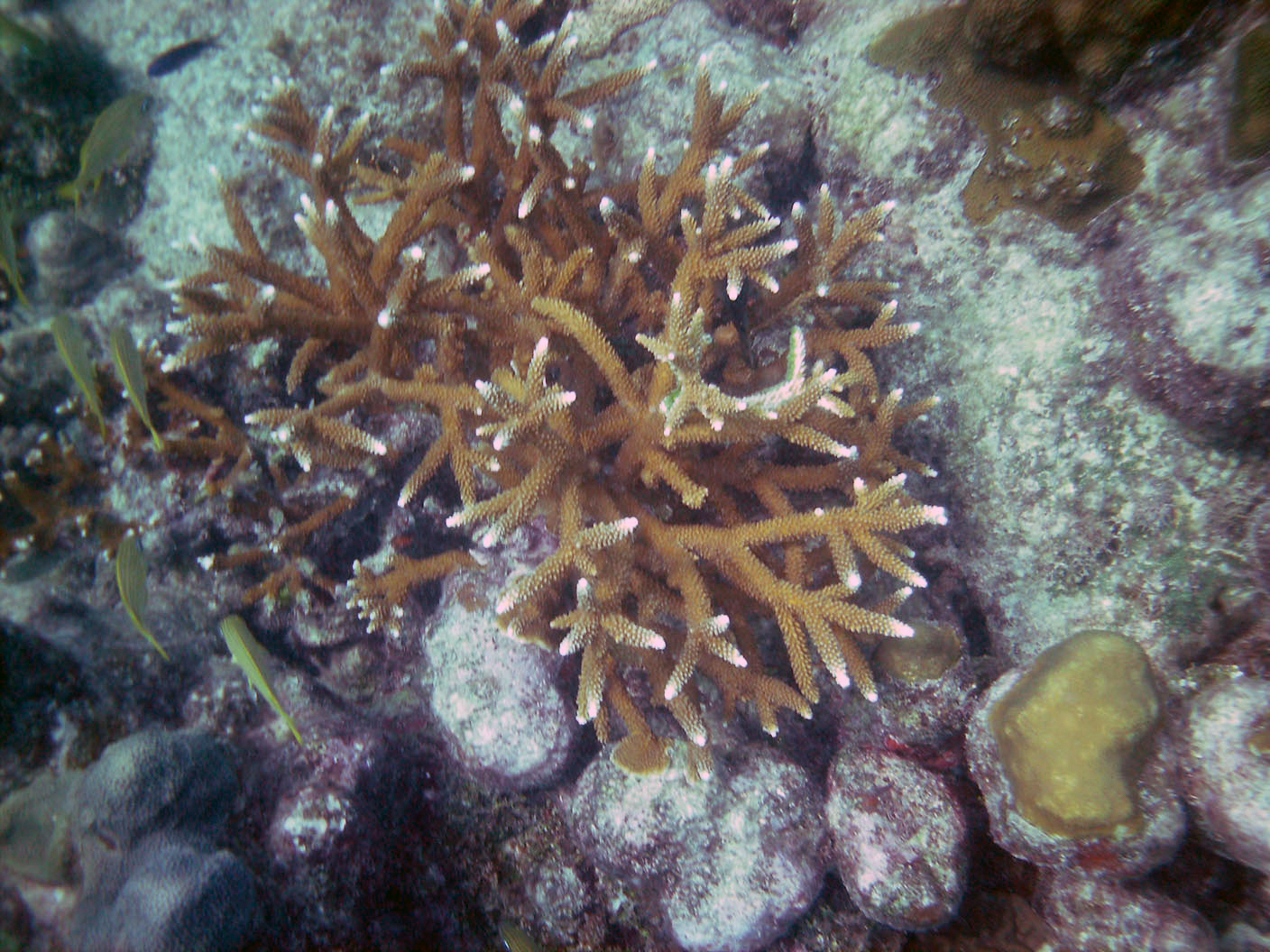
Staghorn coral alive at Looe Key, Florida Keys, July 2010

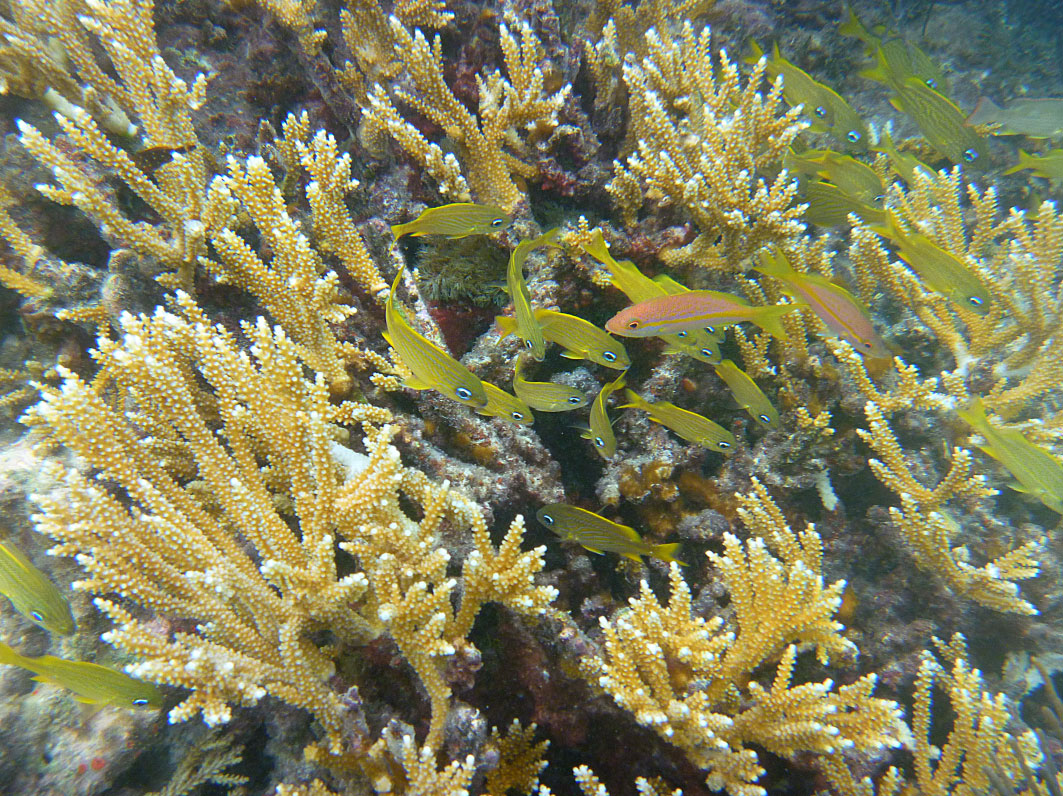
Endangered Staghorn Coral photographed off Haulover Bay, Saint John, US Virgin Islands, June 2013.
