= Halofolliculina corallasia =

Scientific classification
- Domain: Eukaryota
- Clade: Sar
- Clade: Alveolata
- Phylum: Ciliophora
- Class: Heterotrichea
- Order: Heterotrichida
- Family: Folliculinidae
- Genus: Halofolliculina
- Species: H. corallasia

Binomial name
- Halofolliculina corallasia Antonius and Lipscomb, 2001

Species of single-celled organism

Halofolliculina corallasia is a species of heterotrich ciliates identified as a cause of the syndrome called skeletal eroding band (SEB). It is the first coral disease pathogen that is a protozoan as well as the first known to be a eukaryote; all others identified are bacteria. Like other members of the folliculinid family, H. corallasia is sessile and lives in a "house" called a lorica, into which the cell can retreat when disturbed. The mouth is flanked by a pair of wing-like projections that are fringed with polykinetids, groups of cilia that work in groups to produce a current that draws food into the "mouth".

This species is so far the only known agent causing skeletal eroding band, the most common disease of corals in the Indian and Pacific Oceans, and also found in the Red Sea. A very similar disease was later discovered in the Caribbean Sea, but is caused by a different species of the same genus and occurs in a different type of environment.

== Description ==
Halofolliculina corallasia was first observed in reefs near Motupore Island in Bootless Inlet, Papua New Guinea in 1988, and named in 2001. The species name corallasia is a combination of "coral" and the Greek word lasios (λάσιος), which means "densely overgrown". H. corallasia is a member of the ciliate group of protozoans. Ciliates are among the most complex of single-celled eukaryote organisms, distinguished by three characteristics. First, it reproduces both by cell division (splitting one cell into two) and by conjugation, in which two organisms temporarily join in order to swap DNA. Second, it has two cell nuclei. The larger, called the "macronucleus", carries out the normal work of the cell by transcribing DNA into RNA, which is used to control the cell's functions. The smaller "micronucleus" is used only for reproducing the organism by cell division and by conjugation. And third, it has cilia at some stage in its life cycle.

Heterotrichs, which are among the largest protozoans, have a spiral of polykinetids around their "mouths". These are groups of cilia that work in groups to produce a current that draws food into the "mouth". Members of the heterotrich family Folliculinidae are sessile, enclosing the rear ends in a lorica (Latin for cuirass, flexible body armor) that is anchored to a surface, and into which the cells retract when disturbed. The mouth is flanked by a pair of wing-like projections that are fringed with polykinetids. H. corallasia is smaller than other members of the same genus, having a flask-shaped lorica typically 220 μm long and 95 μm wide, and "wings" that are 175 to 200 μm long when fully extended. Its lorica, which is dark gray or black and made of a chitin-like substance, has flaps that close its opening when the cell is retracted.

== Skeletal Eroding Band ==
Skeletal Eroding Band, the most common disease of corals in the Indian and Pacific Oceans and also found in the Red Sea, is the first recorded disease of corals that is caused by a protozoan, and the first caused by a eukaryote – most are caused by bacteria. The disease is visible as a black band that slowly advances over corals, leaving dead coral in its wake. It is spread by cell division of Halofolliculina corallasia, which produces a pair of worm-like larvae that settle on undamaged coral just ahead of the black band. There each secretes its lorica, at the same spinning to produce the lorica's flask-like shape. This spinning, combined with the chemicals that harden the lorica, crumble the coral skeleton and kill the polyps. The discarded loricae of the "parent" H. corallasia cells remain, leaving a spotted region in the wake of the living black band. This distinguishes Skeletal Eroding Band from Black band disease, which leaves a completely white dead area behind it. H. corallasia is the first protozoan and the first eukaryote that is known to cause a disease in corals.

A survey in the Caribbean Sea conducted in 2004 and published in 2006 reported a disease with very similar symptoms as SEB, affecting 25 species of coral within 6 families. Although the authors initially suspected H.corallasia, more detailed examination showed that the culprit was another species that was previously unknown and has not yet been formally named, although it is clearly a member of the same genus, Halofolliculina. A follow-up analysis noted that the Caribbean infestations were most common in oceanic waters, while those in the Indian and Pacific Oceans were more prevalent in coastal waters. Its authors therefore gave this new manifestation the name "Caribbean ciliate infection".
