= Lorica (biology) =

Shell-like protective outer covering of organisms

In biology, a lorica is a shell-like protective outer covering, often reinforced with sand grains and other particles that some protozoans and loriciferan animals secrete. Usually it is tubular or conical in shape, with a loose case that is closed at one end. An example is the protozoan genus Stentor, in which the lorica is trumpet-shaped. In the tintinnids, the lorica is frequently transparent and is used as a domicile. Halofolliculina corallasia has a lorica that is attached as an outer structure, and into which it retracts when disturbed.

== Formation process ==
There are three phases in the formation of lorica: agglomeration in a natural cast; helical extension; and stabilization.

=== Agglomeration ===
During agglomeration, the organism collects and assembles particles from its environment. These particles are then used to construct the initial framework of the lorica.

=== Helical extension ===
In the helical extension phase, the lorica is extended and shaped, often with a helical or spiral growth pattern. This phase involves the secretion of materials by the organism to reinforce the structure.

=== Stabilization ===
The final phase, stabilization, involves the hardening and completion of the lorica. This process ensures that the lorica is durable and capable of providing effective protection.

== Ecological role ==
The lorica serves several ecological roles:

- Protection: It offers physical protection against predators and environmental stresses.
- Buoyancy: For some planktonic organisms, the lorica can aid in maintaining buoyancy in the water column.
- Habitat: It provides a stable habitat for the organism, allowing it to carry out its life processes in a secure environment.

== Etymology ==
The original meaning of the word "lorica" is cuirass, a type of chest armor, originally made of leather, afterward of plates of metal or horn sewn on linen or the like.

== Research and studies ==
Research on loricae has provided insights into the evolutionary adaptations and ecological strategies of microorganisms. Studies have focused on the structural diversity, material composition, and the genetic mechanisms underlying lorica formation.

== See also ==
- Chitin
- Periostracum
- Tectin
