= White plague (coral disease) =

Group of coral diseases

White plague is a suite of coral diseases of which three types have been identified, initially in the Florida Keys. They are infectious diseases but it has proved difficult to identify the pathogens involved. White plague type II may be caused by the gram negative bacterium Aurantimonas coralicida in the order Hyphomicrobiales but other bacteria have also been associated with diseased corals and viruses may also be implicated.

== History ==
In 1977, a disease of scleractinian corals appeared on reefs off the Florida Keys in the United States and was termed white plague. It caused white lesions and was shown to be an infectious disease, being particularly prevalent in Mycetophyllia ferox. This disease caused little mortality and occurred sporadically, but was still present in the area in 1984. It is now known as white plague type 1.

In 1995, a new coral disease was described as an epizootic disease in the same reefs in the Florida Keys. Many species of coral found in the area were affected and the mortality rate of these was up to 38%. The pathogen involved was found to be a previously unknown species of bacterium in the order Hyphomicrobiales, which was placed in the newly created genus Aurantimonas and given the name Aurantimonas coralicida, and the disease was described as white plague type 2. The pathogen was isolated from a diseased colony of Dichocoenia stokesi and cultured in the laboratory, subsequently being used to inoculate two healthy colonies which then developed the disease. In the next few months, it had spread over 200 km (124 mi) of reef and was killing seventeen species of coral. Over the next four years, it spread further, but was most severe in different regions each year.

White plague is an enigmatic disease. Further research cast into doubt the role of A. coralicida as a causative agent by finding that bacterium on healthy parts of colonies of Orbicella annularis affected by white plague disease but absent from diseased parts. In these diseased colonies, an α-proteobacterium similar to one which causes a disease in juvenile oysters has been implicated, being found on the diseased parts of the coral but not on the sound tissues. These anomalous findings may be caused by the fact that there are two or more diseases with similar symptoms, both known as white plague.

In 1999, a third and still more virulent variant appeared in the northern Florida Keys. White plague type III mostly affected Colpophyllia natans and Orbicella annularis.

A white-plague like disease reported from the Red Sea in 2005 has been shown to be caused by a different bacterial pathogen, Thalassomonas loyana. Further research has shown that viruses may be involved in white plague infections, the coral small circular ssDNA viruses (SCSDVs) being present in association with diseased tissue. This group of viruses is known to cause disease in plants and animals.

== Description ==
As first described by College of Charleston professor Philip Dustan in 1977, white plague type 1 produces lesions on any part of the colony. These increase gradually in size, advancing at the rate of a few millimetres per day. The advancing edge exhibits a sharp boundary between the apparently healthy tissue and the bare skeleton. Type II, first appearing in 1995 is similar, but it usually starts at the base of the colony, and the edge advances at a faster rate, up to 2 cm (0.8 in) per day. White plague type III advances at a rate in excess of two centimetres per day.
