= Aurantimonas coralicida =

Scientific classification
- Domain: Bacteria
- Kingdom: Pseudomonadati
- Phylum: Pseudomonadota
- Class: Alphaproteobacteria
- Order: Hyphomicrobiales
- Family: Aurantimonadaceae
- Genus: Aurantimonas
- Species: A. coralicida

Binomial name
- Aurantimonas coralicida Denner et al. 2003

Species of bacterium

Aurantimonas coralicida is a gram-negative bacterium, and a causative agent of white plague in Caribbean corals. It is rod-shaped, with polar flagella.

== Description ==
An obligate aerobe, A. coralicida obtains its nourishment chemoheterotrophically. It tests positive for oxidase and catalase, and contains carotenoid pigments, possibly to protect against solar radiation.

== Role in Disease ==
A. coralicida is believed to be the causative agent of white plague, a disease of some corals. This was first described in 1995 in an epizootic in reefs in the Florida Keys. 17 of 43 coral species in the area were infected, and up to 38% of infected corals died.

== Genetics ==
The type strain of A. coralicida is WP1^{T}(=CIP 107386^{T} =DSM 14790^{T}), which was the original strain isolated.

== History ==
A coralicida was originally isolated as the cause of white plague in coral in the Caribbean in 1998. In 2003, the 16S rRNA sequence of the bacterium was compared to other known sequences to determine its taxonomic relationship to other bacteria. It was found to be a previously undescribed member of the order Hyphomicrobiales and was classified under the newly created genus Aurantimonas as Aurantimonas coralicida.
