= Aspergillus olivicola =

Scientific classification
- Kingdom: Fungi
- Division: Ascomycota
- Class: Eurotiomycetes
- Order: Eurotiales
- Family: Aspergillaceae
- Genus: Aspergillus
- Species: A. olivicola

Binomial name
- Aspergillus olivicola Frisvad, Zalar & Samson (2008)

Species of fungus

Aspergillus olivicola is a species of fungus in the genus Aspergillus. It is from the Nidulantes section. The species was first described in 2008. It has been isolated from fruit in Italy. A. olivicola has been shown to produce aflatoxin B1, emericellin, shamixanthone, siderin, sterigmatocystin, terrein, and varitriol.

In 2016, the genome of A. olivicola was sequenced as a part of the Aspergillus whole-genome sequencing project - a project dedicated to performing whole-genome sequencing of all members of the genus Aspergillus. The genome assembly size was 33.17 Mbp.

== Growth and morphology ==
Aspergillus olivicola has been cultivated on both Czapek yeast extract agar (CYA) plates and Malt Extract Agar Oxoid (MEAOX) plates. The growth morphology of the colonies can be seen in the pictures below.

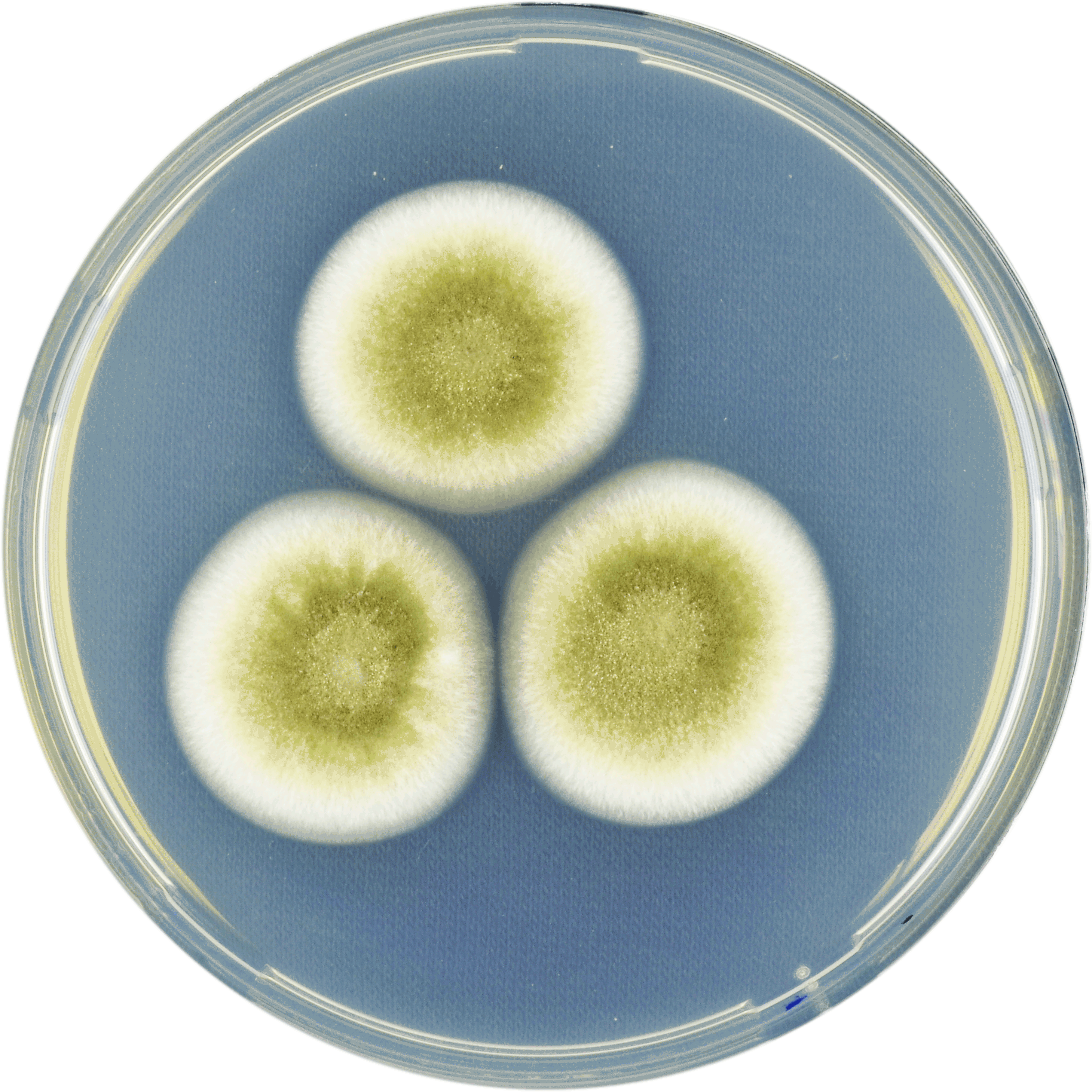
Aspergillus olivicola growing on CYA plate

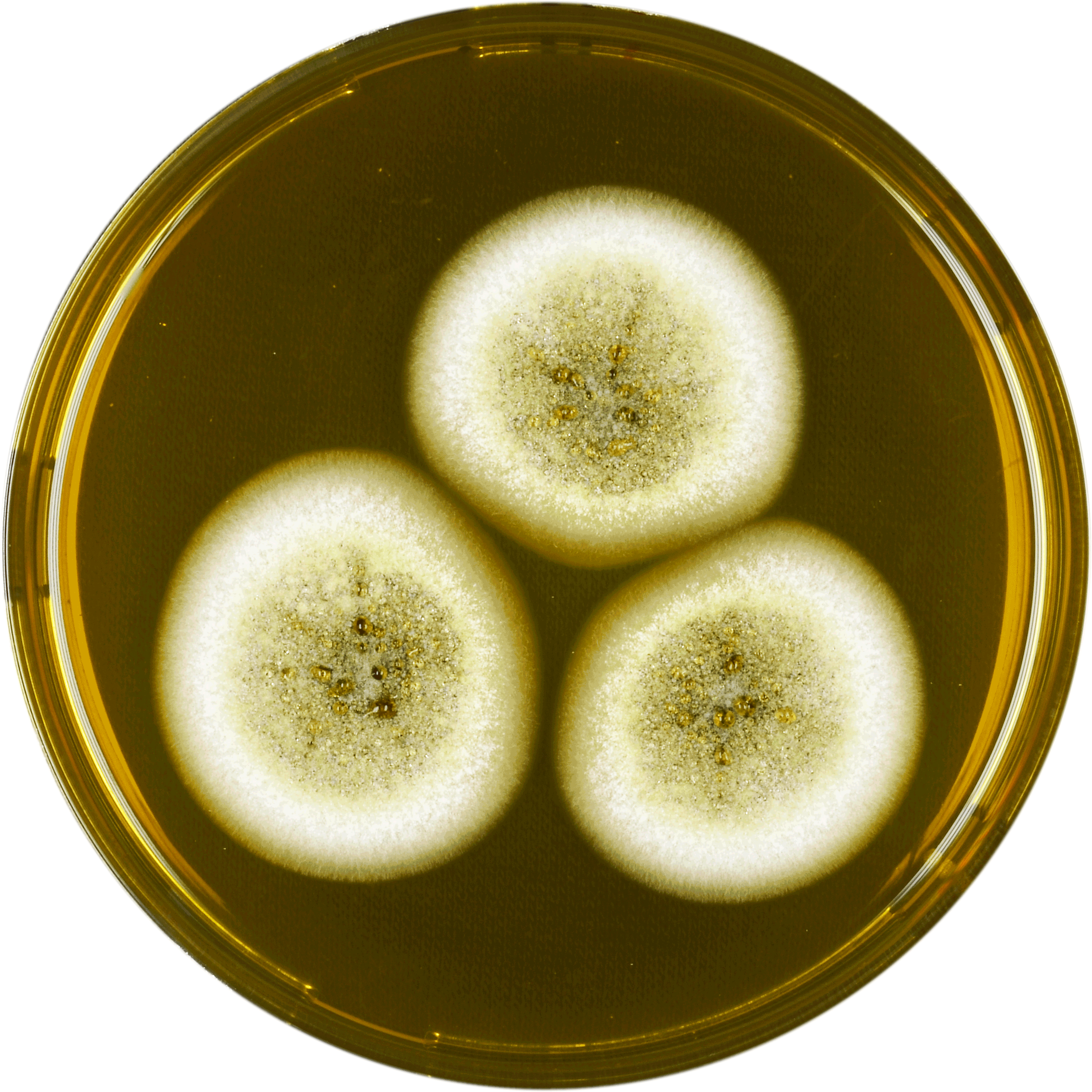
Aspergillus olivicola growing on MEAOX plate
