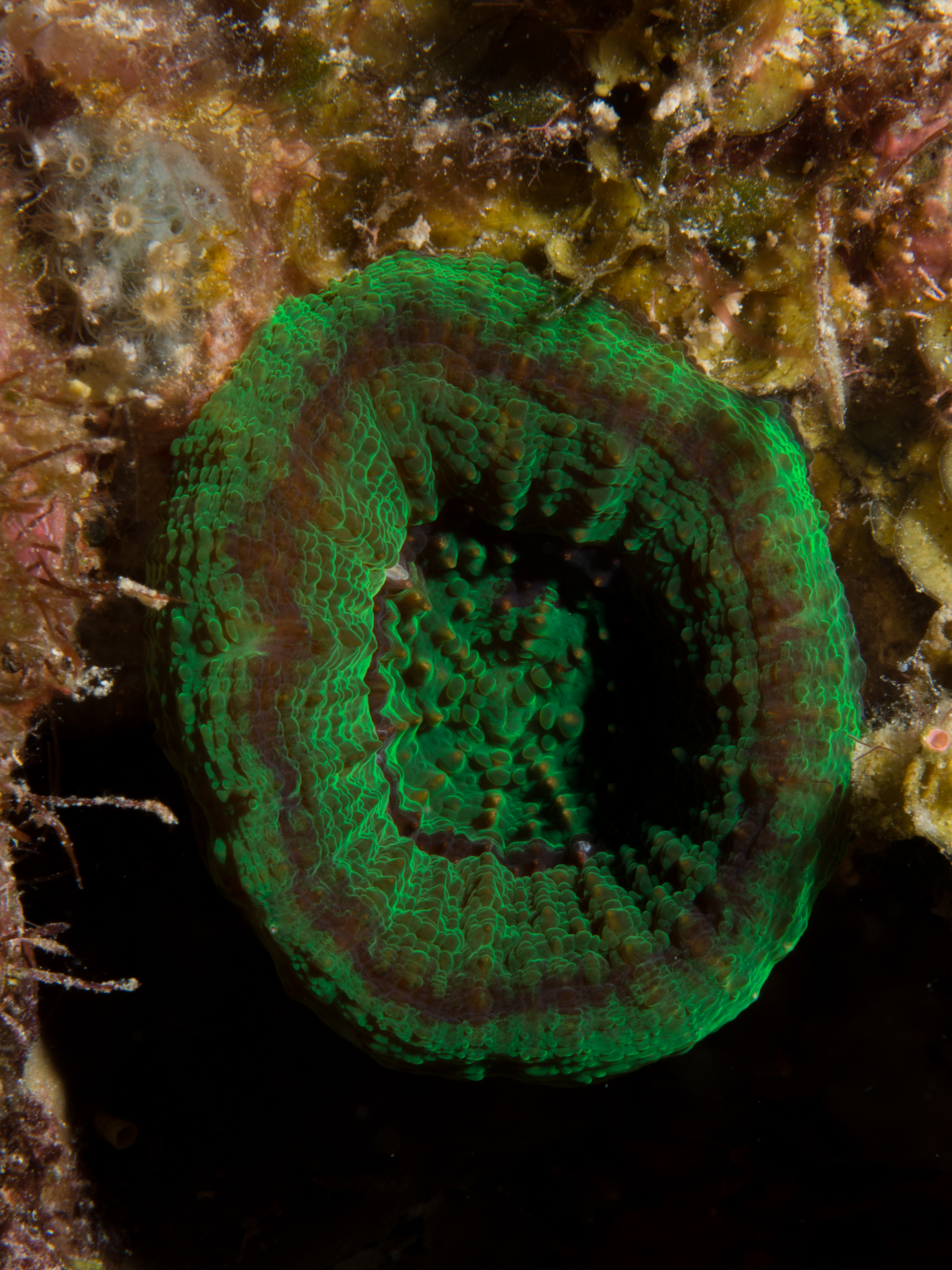

Conservation status
- Critically Endangered (IUCN 3.1)

- Vulnerable (NatureServe)

Scientific classification
- Kingdom: Animalia
- Phylum: Cnidaria
- Subphylum: Anthozoa
- Class: Hexacorallia
- Order: Scleractinia
- Family: Mussidae
- Genus: Scolymia
- Species: S. cubensis

Binomial name
- Scolymia cubensis Milne Edwards & Haime, 1849

= Scolymia cubensis =

Species of coral

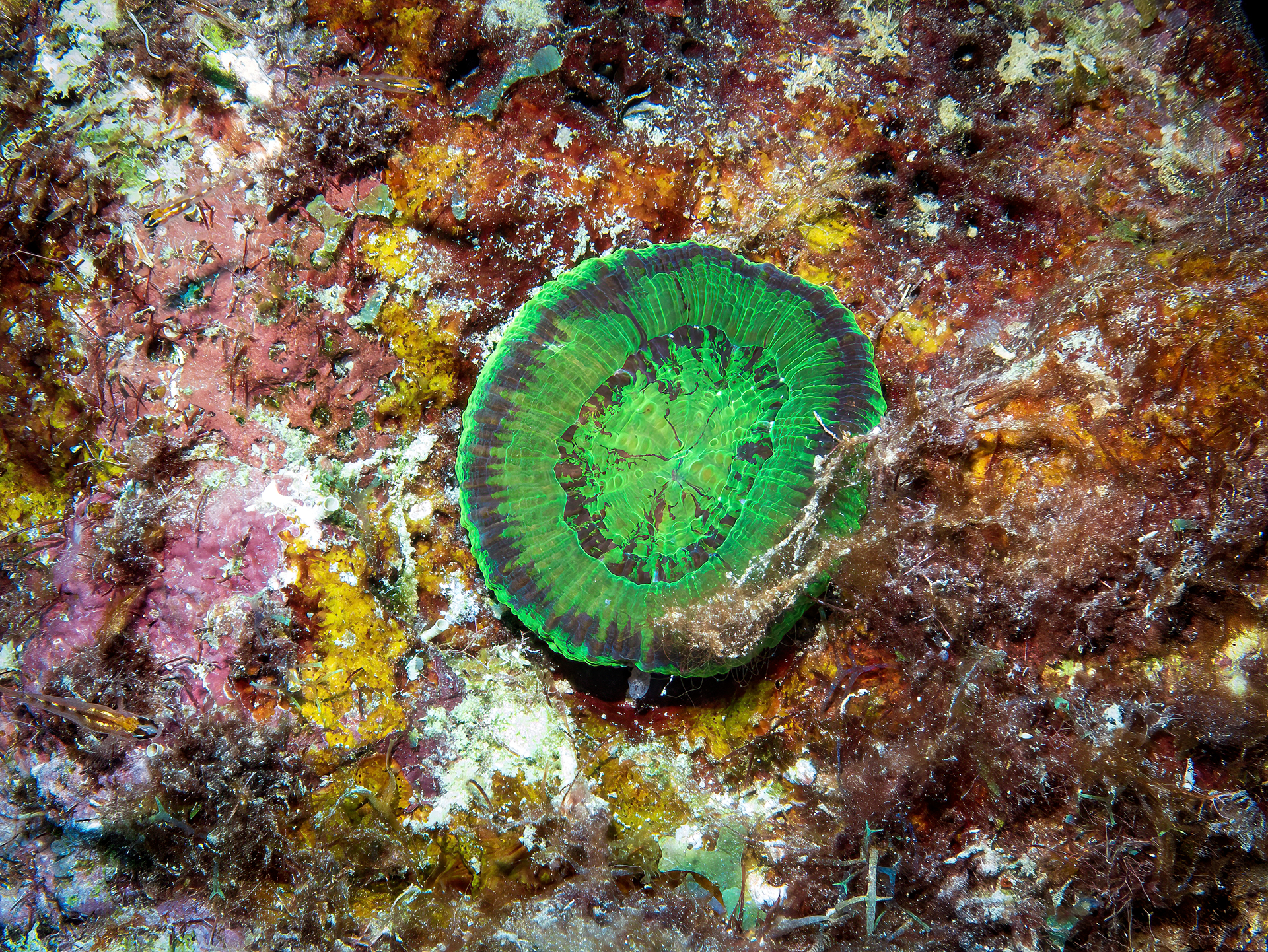
A juvenile artichoke coral. Westpunt, Curacao

Scolymia cubensis is a solitary coral that belongs the genus Scolymia. It is a smooth disk coral whose shape usually consists of a flat, concave form (patellate) or an inverted cone form. However, a cylindrical shape may occur. They have a maximum diameter of 10 cm and have a symbiotic bond with zooxanthellae. Despite this, S. cubensis do not create their own reefs. Their colors normally consist of light green, light beige or a deep rusty red.

== Distribution ==
Scolymia cubensis live on the coasts of Bermuda and Jamaica. In Bermuda they are typically situated on reefs and platforms; 6 meters to 62 meters below the surface of the water. In Jamaica, they exist on sandy channels between reefs and on muddy slopes close to river mouths. S. cubensis prefer to be in areas where sunlight can't reach. They grow more abundantly at low latitudes and on hard substrates and are seen to be more active in warm tropical waters during the warm summer months.

== Description ==
Their skeletal structure is constructed of layers of septa that surround the core of the organism. The first layer around the core consists of septa plates that are thick in diameter; 6 septa in total. The second layer around the coral is thinner when compared to the first layer and consists of 7 or more septa overlaying the first layer. Those of the third and so on will vary in thickness as the coral continues to grow. S. cubensis can have 104 to 112 septa in total that surrounding their core. S. cubensis have rough costae that are covered in spines, and a "spongy trabecular columellae". They have non-aggressive polyps which makes them vulnerable to aggressive species of coral and have been seen to grow more horizontally than vertically.

== Reproduction ==
The species reproduces sexually by broadcast spawning. S. cubensis does not own a strong intraspecific "immune-recognition system", which allows them to fuse with themselves. After fertilization, the new larva floats in open water and eventually lands on a reef deposit. If this larvae lands close enough to another adult S. cubensis they have a high probability to fuse together as the larval S. cubensis grows. When S. cubensis fuse they form a common calcareous deposit in between them. This results in di- or tri corallites or corals that are made of two or three S. cubensis corals all fused together. The subunits are genetically different as a result of the sexual reproduction but can still fuse together as if they are the same individual.

== Behavior ==
=== Self-management ===
Scolymia cubensis like to settle on reefs that have steep angles to more easily dispose of sediments that get caught around their oral disks. They get rid of the build-up of sediments by using their mucus strands along with water currents to congregate the sediments to edge of their oral disc. Once at the edge of the oral disc, their mouth will periodically undulate or move in and out to shake off the sediments. The sediments when being gathered for disposal are moved downward towards the part of the oral disc that is most downslope; so they also have the assistance of gravity to help them out. This action is easier for corals that are aligned at a steep angle than corals that are aligned horizontally.

=== Competition ===
In Jamaica, S. cubensis engage in interspecific aggression with Scolymia lacera over light and space but are outcompeted by the latter. The S. lacera are able to kill the tissue of S. cubensis by an "extracoelenteric feeding response". When the polyps of S. lacera come in contact to S. cubensis they are able to destroy and eat the tissue of the S. cubensis coral; eventually exposing its skeleton and killing it. This aggression can persist even in extreme cases of starvation and lack of sunlight. Despite this S. cubensis are considered to be the 9th most aggressive species of coral in Jamaica.
