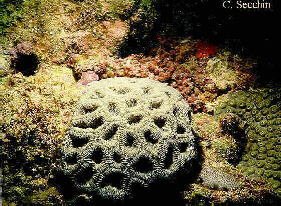
- Mussismilia hispida, brain coral

Scientific classification
- Kingdom: Animalia
- Phylum: Cnidaria
- Subphylum: Anthozoa
- Class: Hexacorallia
- Order: Scleractinia
- Family: Mussidae
- Genus: Mussismilia; Ortmann, 1890

Species
- See text

= Mussismilia =

Genus of corals

== Description ==
Mussismilia is a colonial coral. Budding is always intracalicular, occurring inside the oral disc of the polyp, within the whorl of tentacles. The corallites are phaceloid or subplocoid, with irregular teeth or one to three centres being linked. When coenosteum is present, there is a distinctive double wall. The columella is discontinuous. The septa are porous and have unique, multi-directional teeth formed of twisted threads. The columella is spongy, and the columellar teeth are different in size and shape from the septal teeth.

== Classification ==
Mussismilia is a genus of stony corals in the subfamily Faviinae of the family Mussidae. This genus is restricted to the Atlantic Ocean off the coasts of Brazil.

=== Hexacorallia ===
Hexacorallia belong to the class Anthozoa, comprising organisms that form polyps with 6-fold symmetry, which includes all of the stony and reef-building corals.

=== Scleractinia ===
Scleractinia are stony corals in the phylum Cnidaria and build themselves a hard skeleton. The individual animals are known as polyps and have a cylindrical body crowned by an oral disc in which a mouth is fringed with tentacles

=== Mussidae ===
Mussidae are a family of stony coral restricted to the Atlantic Ocean, they have a massive spheroid form with convolutions that resemble a brain. They are reef-building corals that are popular in captivity, but also the most vulnerable to coral bleaching and climate change

=== Faviinae ===
A family of stony reef-building corals that contain zooxanthellae, gaining energy from their symbionts as well as captured prey such as brine shrimp. They have massive colonies which can be in a phaceloid, plocoid, ceroid, or meandroid (rarely) shaped. They prefer intense sunlight and moderate water currents, especially since their preferred habitats are reef flats. They can tolerate dynamic environments, such as variations in salinity.

== Distribution and habitat ==
According to an analysis of the fossil record, Mussismilia used to be found all over the world. It is estimated that the genus originated between 23 million years ago to 400,000 years ago. However, currently, Mussismilia only occurs in South America’s Atlantic coastline.^{[9]}

M. hispida has the widest geographic distribution of the four species of Mussismilia. This species reaches the Brazilian states of Maranhão, Rio Grande do Norte, Paraíba, Pernambuco, Alagoas, Sergipe, Bahia, Espírito Santo, Rio de Janeiro, and São Paulo, showing how expansive its reach is. It can also be found on farther-off oceanic coral reefs, like those of Fernando de Noronha Island and the Rocas Atoll.^{[5]} The various species of Mussismilia are also found in specific geographic locations:

- M. hispida can be found in shallow water and are tolerant of turbid environments.
- M. braziliensis can be found in shallow or subtidal reef environments of Bahia State and Abrolhos reefs.
- M. harttii occurs from the coast of Ceará to Espírito Santo States, and found at depths of 2-6m; however, isolated records indicate that they can be found in deeper reefs up to 80m.
- M. leptophylla occurs along the coast of Bahia.

== Species ==
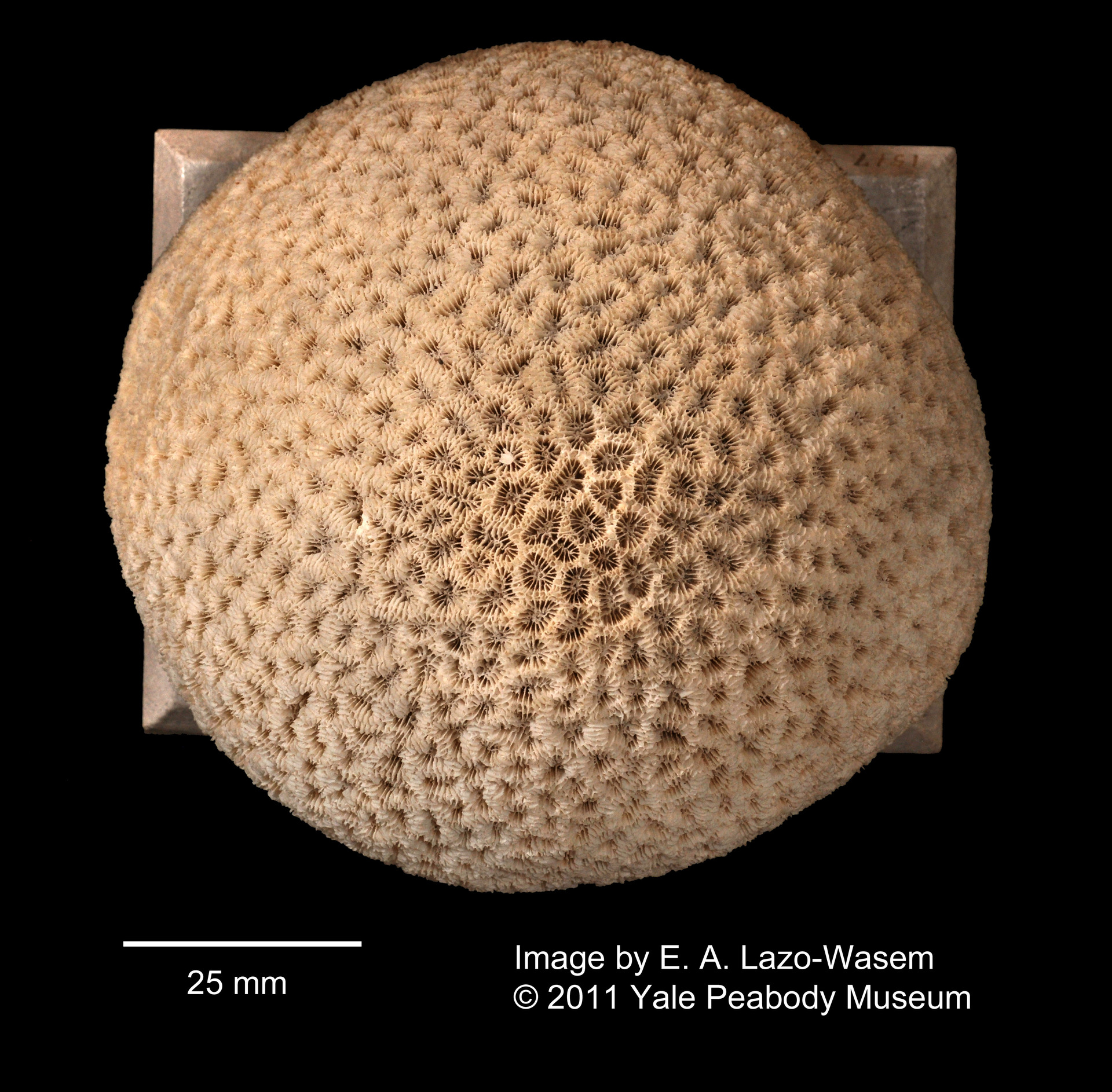
Mussismilia leptophylla (syn. Favia leptophylla

The World Register of Marine Species lists the following three species:

Mussismilia braziliensis

Mussismilia braziliensis form massive colonies, which are usually large domes on reef tops. They have a cerioid colony form with an irregular shape and are around 8–10 mm in diameter. Septa of living colonies have rounded, bead-like dentations. These species are commonly blue-grey, green, and yellow in color and live in shallow or subtidal reef environments around Brazil. Due to the unique structural composition of M. braziliensis, organisms such as T. hirsutus crabs depend on the coral for habitat compared to the other Mussismilia species.

Mussismilia harttii (Verrill, 1868)

Mussismilia harttii has a phaceloid colony form and has calice diameters of 12–30 mm with 12–14 thin septa per cm. It is observed to have a greater crustacean fauna richness compared to the other species of Mussismilia due to its large meandroid pattern, in which polyps are larger and grow apart.

Mussismilia hispida (Verrill, 1901)

Mussismilia hispida colonies are massive colonies, less than 0.5 meters across, and usually flat. They are round with thick walls, which are around 10–15 mm in diameter. Septa of living colonies have rounded, bead-like teeth. These species are brown and grey in color, usually with different colored walls and centers with radial stripes. They live in shallow water and can tolerate unstable environments, making them more adaptable to the changing climate.

Mussismilia leptophylla

Initially, this species was placed in the genus Favia because it was thought to lack multiple trabecular fan systems which are commonly found in Mussismilia. However, researchers have found that Mussismilia leptophylla do contain more than one fan system and additional features in common with Mussismilia than Favia, including its parathecal wall structure and the shape of its septal teeth and microstructure. Its mitochondrial structure also groups it more closely with Mussismilia.

== Morphology and anatomy ==
=== Macromorphology (overall physical form) ===
colony form: phaceloid or subplocoid

calice: Species of Mussismilia differ in colony form and calice size

Septa: thin and often porous near the columella

columella: continuous with trabecular linkage between centres.

corallite wall: parathecal wall

=== Micromorphology (3D geometry of teeth/septa, etc) ===
Septa: regular lacerate (twisted and multidirectional), spine-shaped porous granulation

Columella: spongy, and vary in size and shape from septal teeth

=== Microstructure (internal structure) ===
Wall: Parathecal (which is a Corallite wall formed by dissepiments or divisions in the tissue), along with calcifications in the wall

== Ecology and behavior ==
=== Feeding and diet ===
Mussismilia are mixotrophic organisms, meaning they rely on both photoautotrophy and heterotrophy for their feeding behavior, as was found through observation of fatty acid concentration and microalgae concentration in the host tissue of the species M. hispida.^{[9]} Their state of being predominantly autotrophic or predominantly heterotrophic shifted many times over the year the study was conducted. Mussismilia also lives in symbiosis with dinoflagellate, photosynthetic algae that live within their tissue. The dinoflagellate uses sunlight to make sugar which results in energy that the corals can use. Mussismilia can also be heterotrophic, capturing and digesting zooplankton.

=== Predators ===
According to a live coral predation study conducted by Francini-Filho et al. (2008), Brazilian endemic parrotfish species, Scarus trispinosus and Sparisoma amplum, preyed mainly on M. braziliensis and F. gravida.^{[5]} The study further accounted for bites that were allocated to live corals Sc. trispinosus (0.8% of bites) and Sp. amplum (8.1% of bites). Of 17 recorded predations, Sp. amplum preyed on M. braziliensis most frequently (n=15) in the Timbebas Reef of Brazil.^{[5]}

=== Symbionts and microbiota ===
The most abundant bacterium found in healthy Mussismilia corals include Alphaproteobacteria, Gammaproteobacteria, Cyanobacteria, Bacteroidetes, and Firmicute. Diseased corals were found to have a distinct microbiota, dominated by Bacteroidetes, Gammaproteobacteria, and unclassified Proteobacteria. The most abundant groups in the bare skeleton (SK) were Deltaproteobacteria, Alphaproteobacteria,, and Gammaproteobacteria, with a greater amount of Vibrios and Sulfate-Reducing Bacteria compared to healthy corals.

== Reproduction ==
Three species of Mussismilia (M. braziliensis, M. hartti, and M. hispida) exhibit annual reproduction cycles with an average length of 11 months. These species are hermaphroditic species, with gamete development occurring at varying times among the species during the same breeding season.^{[15]} These Mussismilia species are broadcast spawners, as no gonochoric colonies, embryos or planulae are observed. As broadcast spawners, Mussumilia release their gametes into the open ocean for external fertilization. Research suggests that spawner corals, specifically M hispida, can transmit their bacterial core to their offspring via their gametes, influencing the evolution of the future generations.^{[15]}

Oogenesis begins several months before spermatogenesis. The organ in which spermatozoa is produced occurs during the eighth month of ovary development. As a result, both organs matured at the same time.

Oocyte development: During each developmental stage of oogenesis, a singular mesentery contains oocytes of varying-sized diameters. Initially, the nucleus was found in the central portion of the cell; however, it migrated to the border of the cell as the oocytes attained their maximum development. Mature oocytes appear irregular, but roughly spherical.

Spermaries development: During spermatogenesis, cells are in the endoderm of mesenteries, and then begin to concentrate. Like in oogenesis, the spermatic cells develop inside the same mesenteries. The nuclei become more visible. More mature cells are centrally located while those that are not are located peripherally.

When the spermatic cysts and eggs achieve maturity, the mesentery wall ruptures, allowing the bundles of spermatic cysts, eggs, and mucus to travel through the mouth and into the gastrovascular cavity, ultimately reaching the surface.^{[15]}

Spawning: Each species has at least one spawning period, but it is possible to have two spawning periods within the reproductive cycle. The spawning period of M. hartti significantly differs from that of M. braziliensis and M. hispida. However, the period of spawning has occurred during different months across many studies.^{[10,15]}

== Life stages ==
Mature corals release their gametes into the water column allowing for external fertilization to occur (meiosis). Once the egg is fertilized, it begins to develop. The fertilized egg, a zygote, then drifts into the current. During this drift, the zygote undergoes cell division (mitosis). Two cells form after the first division, and these cells undergo mitosis. Multiple divisions occur ultimately resulting in an embryo.

A planktonic planula larva forms. The planula uses its cilia to move to find a solid substrate to settle on. Once settled, metamorphosis begins (the juvenile develops into an adult). The juvenile polyp lays down a calcium carbonate corallite. When the adult polyp is sexually mature, the life cycle repeats.^{[16]}

== Movement ==
Some corals move in time to the current, but others such as Mussimilia have rock-like skeletons, so movements are not clearly visible. Researchers used a novel analysis imaging method to shoot photos of rocky corals to track their movements. They found that most activities occurred under nocturnal conditions including movement for tissue growth and polyp movement. While Mussismilia are stationary for the entirety of their lives, they do have subtle movements required to extend their polyps and capture zooplankton prey. However, it turns out that young corals are surprisingly mobile, moving with the ocean currents, though it is not entirely certain how Mussismilia larvae move.

== Status ==
Mussismilia, like many species of coral, are threatened by climate change and are particularly in danger of becoming extinct. The overall numbers of Mussismilia are hard to determine but shifts in the Earth’s climate has caused a gradual decrease in the numbers of Mussismilia ever since roughly the late 1900s. [2] It is hard to determine the exact time that recent global change started to negatively impact Mussismilia. Coral reefs lie primarily in shallow waters which are warmer than deeper waters. The sunlight does not reach the deeper areas of the ocean. Since the sunlight causes shallow waters to increase in temperature, coral reefs risk of bleaching increases. Bleaching occurs when corals expel the algae living in their tissues which causes the coral to turn white and their chances of survival dramatically decrease. Mussismilia are subject to coral bleaching in warm waters, and as world temperatures increase, Mussismilia can die. Mussismilia are capable of surviving and reproducing during bleaching events but their survival is severely hindered.

== Bibliography ==
- Andrade Galvão de Medeiros, Seoane, J. C. S., Macedo de Mello Baptista, G., Leal, P. R., & Dekker, A. (2022). Effect of temperature and pH on the Millepora alcicornis and Mussismilia harttii corals in light of a spectral reflectance response. International Journal of Remote Sensing, 43(7), 2475–2502.
  - This article is peer reviewed and explains how our climate affects Mussismilia. This topic is very interesting and contributes to a broader discussion about the role that climate change plays in marine biology. It is also useful in establishing notability.
- Fernando, Wang, J., Sparling, K., Garcia, G. D., Francini-Filho, R. B., de Moura, R. L., Paranhos, R., Thompson, F. L., & Thompson, J. R. (2015). Microbiota of the Major South Atlantic Reef Building Coral Mussismilia. Microbial Ecology, 69(2), 267–280.
  - This article is peer reviewed and explains how Mussismilia is one of the main coral reef builders in the South Atlantic. It will be useful when explaining how Mussismilia contributes to the ecosystems it inhabits. It is also helpful when establishing notability.
- Godoy, Mies, M., Zilberberg, C., Pastrana, Y., Amaral, A., Cruz, N., Pereira, C. M., Garrido, A. G., Paris, A., Santos, L. F. A., & Pires, D. O. (2021). Southwestern Atlantic reef-building corals Mussismilia spp. are able to spawn while fully bleached. Marine Biology, 168(2).
  - This peer-reviewed article talks about coral bleaching and how it affects Mussismilia. Bleaching is an event that is occurring at a very high rate, so it is useful and interesting to understand how bleaching affects Mussismilia. Since it covers the topic in depth, it will be useful in establishing notability
- Nogueira, M.M., Neves, E. & Johnsson, R (2015). Effects of habitat structure on the epifaunal community in Mussismilia corals: does coral morphology influence the richness and abundance of associated crustacean fauna?. Helgol Mar Res 69, 221–229
  - This is a scientific article published in Helgoland Marine Research, so it should be a reliable source. They compile research from many scientific articles to study how the distinct morphology of three species of Mussismilia influences their association with crustacean species. This article is helpful when discussing specific facts, but can’t be used to establish notability.
- Oigman-Pszczol, & Creed, J. C. (2004). Size Structure and Spatial Distribution of the Corals Mussismilia Hispida And Siderastrea Stellata (Scleractinia) at Armação Dos Búzios, Brazil. Bulletin of Marine Science, 74(2), 433–448.
  - This is a peer-reviewed article describing the population size structure and spatial distribution of corals on Brazilian rocky shores. This quantitative study looks at Mussismilia hispida and Siderastrea stellata. It is important to understand the structure and distribution of these corals, and we can compare them to other coral found in the same area. Can be helpful in establishing notability as well.
