= Aspergillus stella-maris =

Scientific classification
- Kingdom: Fungi
- Division: Ascomycota
- Class: Eurotiomycetes
- Order: Eurotiales
- Family: Aspergillaceae
- Genus: Aspergillus
- Species: A. stella-maris

Binomial name
- Aspergillus stella-maris Zalar, Frisvad & Samson (2008)

Species of fungus

Aspergillus stella-maris is a species of fungus in the genus Aspergillus. It is from the Nidulantes section. The species was first described in 2008. A. stella-maris has been reported to produce emericellin and shamixanthone. It has star-shaped ascospores.

The genome of A. stella-maris was in 2016 sequenced as a part of the Aspergillus whole-genome sequencing project - a project dedicated to performing whole-genome sequencing of all members of the Aspergillus genus. The genome assembly size was 34.00 Mbp.

== Growth and morphology ==
Aspergillus stella-maris has been cultivated on both Czapek yeast extract agar (CYA) plates and Malt Extract Agar Oxoid (MEAOX) plates. The growth morphology of the colonies can be seen in the pictures below.

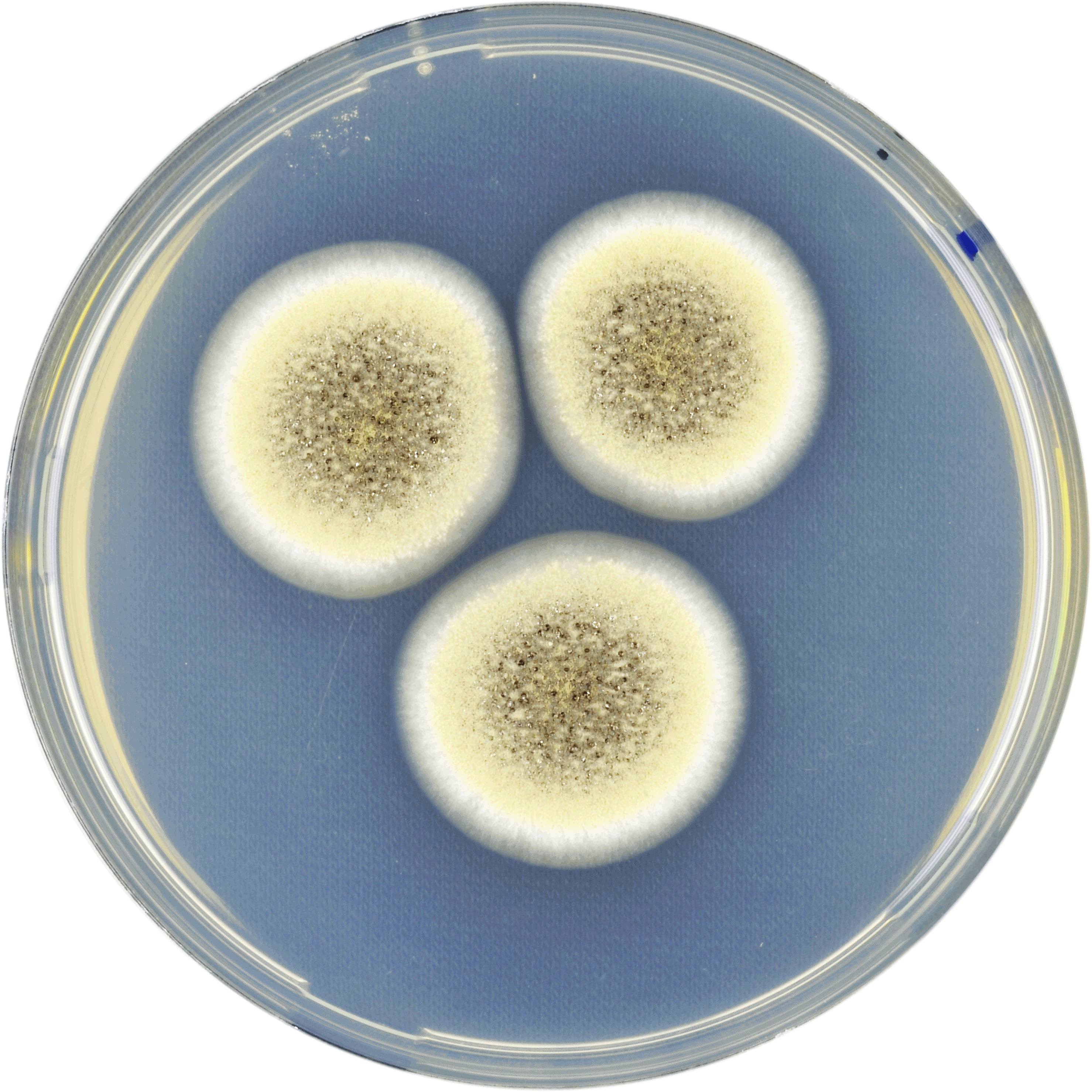
Aspergillus stella-maris growing on CYA plate

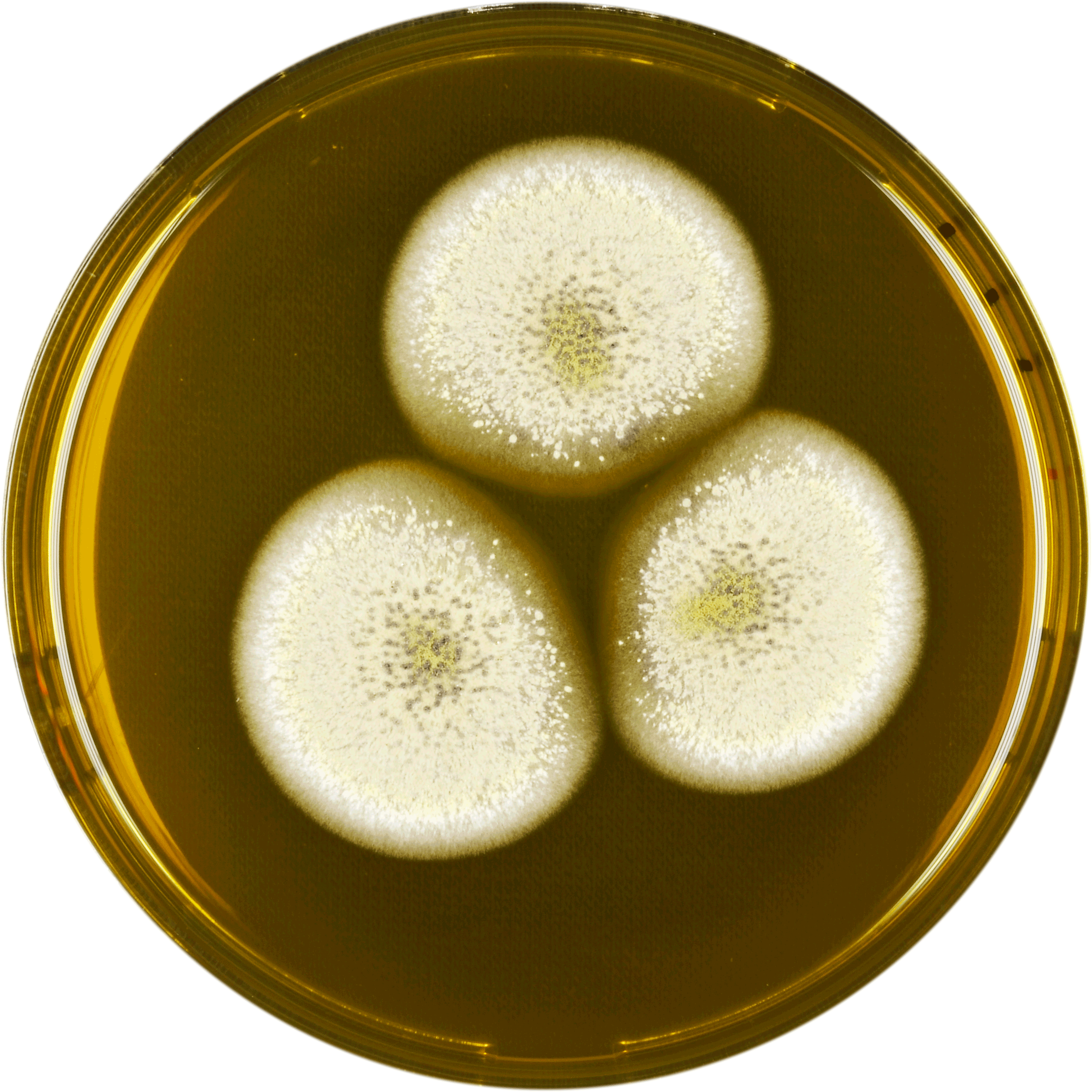
Aspergillus stella-maris growing on MEAOX plate
