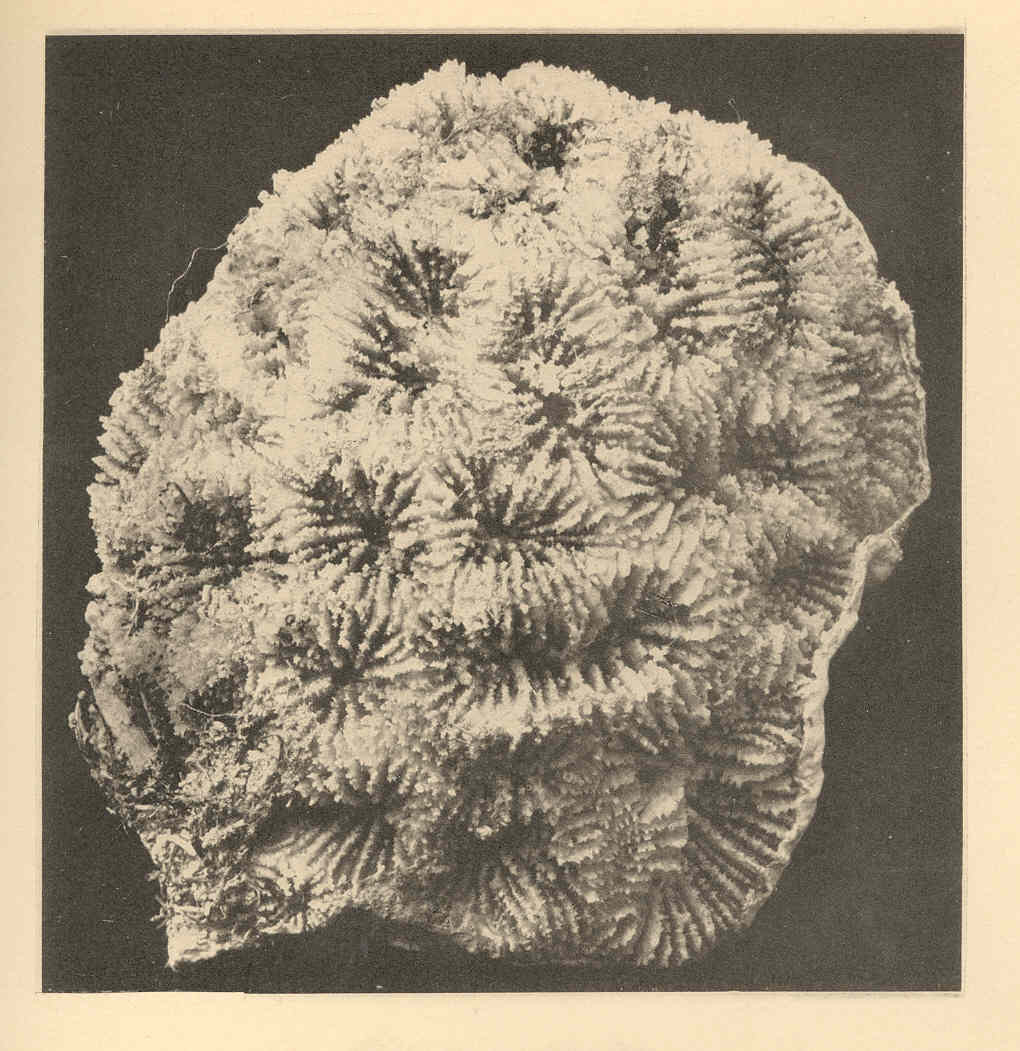

Conservation status
- Least Concern (IUCN 3.1)

Scientific classification
- Kingdom: Animalia
- Phylum: Cnidaria
- Subphylum: Anthozoa
- Class: Hexacorallia
- Order: Scleractinia
- Family: Faviidae
- Genus: Favia
- Species: F. fragum

Binomial name
- Favia fragum (Esper 1795)

Synonyms
- Astraea fragum (Esper, 1795); Madrepora fragum Esper, 1795

= Favia fragum =

Species of coral

Favia fragrum is a species of colonial stony coral in the family Mussidae. It is commonly known as the golfball coral and is found in tropical waters on either side of the Atlantic Ocean.

== Description ==
The golfball coral is small and usually hemispherical in shape with a number of large corallites packed closely together, but It can occur in groups or may occasionally grow as an encrusting coral. The corallites contain one to three polyps and are normally round but can become elongated into an oval shape when the polyps are budding and a new corallite is being formed. The corallite walls usually consist of four complete whorls of septa and do not project appreciably from the surface of the coral. The costae of different corallites are distinct from one another. The colour is usually yellow or pale brown.

== Distribution ==
The golfball coral is found in the tropical Atlantic Ocean at depths down to 30 metres (98 ft) with its range extending from the west coast of equatorial Africa to South America, the Caribbean Sea and the southern United States. It is an inconspicuous species and occurs on coral reefs, on rocks, in seagrass meadows and among seaweed. The IUCN Red List of Threatened Species lists it as being of "least concern". This is because it is widespread and common and a loss of habitat from coral reef destruction is unlikely to impact it significantly.

== Ecology ==
Where degraded reefs have abundant macroalgae, it has been shown experimentally that coral larvae will settle in as great quantities on the seaweed as it will on the rubble substrate. Researchers showed that larvae of Favia fragum settled on Halimeda opuntia, an ephemeral alga that is unsuitable for post-settlement survival, and this may have significant consequences for the recruitment of corals on degraded reefs.
