= Aspergillus haitiensis =

Scientific classification
- Kingdom: Fungi
- Division: Ascomycota
- Class: Eurotiomycetes
- Order: Eurotiales
- Family: Aspergillaceae
- Genus: Aspergillus
- Species: A. haitiensis

Binomial name
- Aspergillus haitiensis Varga, Frisvad & Samson (2010)

Type strain
- CBS 464.91

Species of fungus

Aspergillus haitiensis is a species of fungus in the genus Aspergillus. It is from the Sparsi section. The species was first described in 2010. It has been isolated from soil in Haiti. It has been reported to produce gregatins and siderin.

== Growth and morphology ==
A. haitiensis has been cultivated on both Czapek yeast extract agar (CYA) plates and Malt Extract Agar Oxoid (MEAOX) plates. The growth morphology of the colonies can be seen in the pictures below.

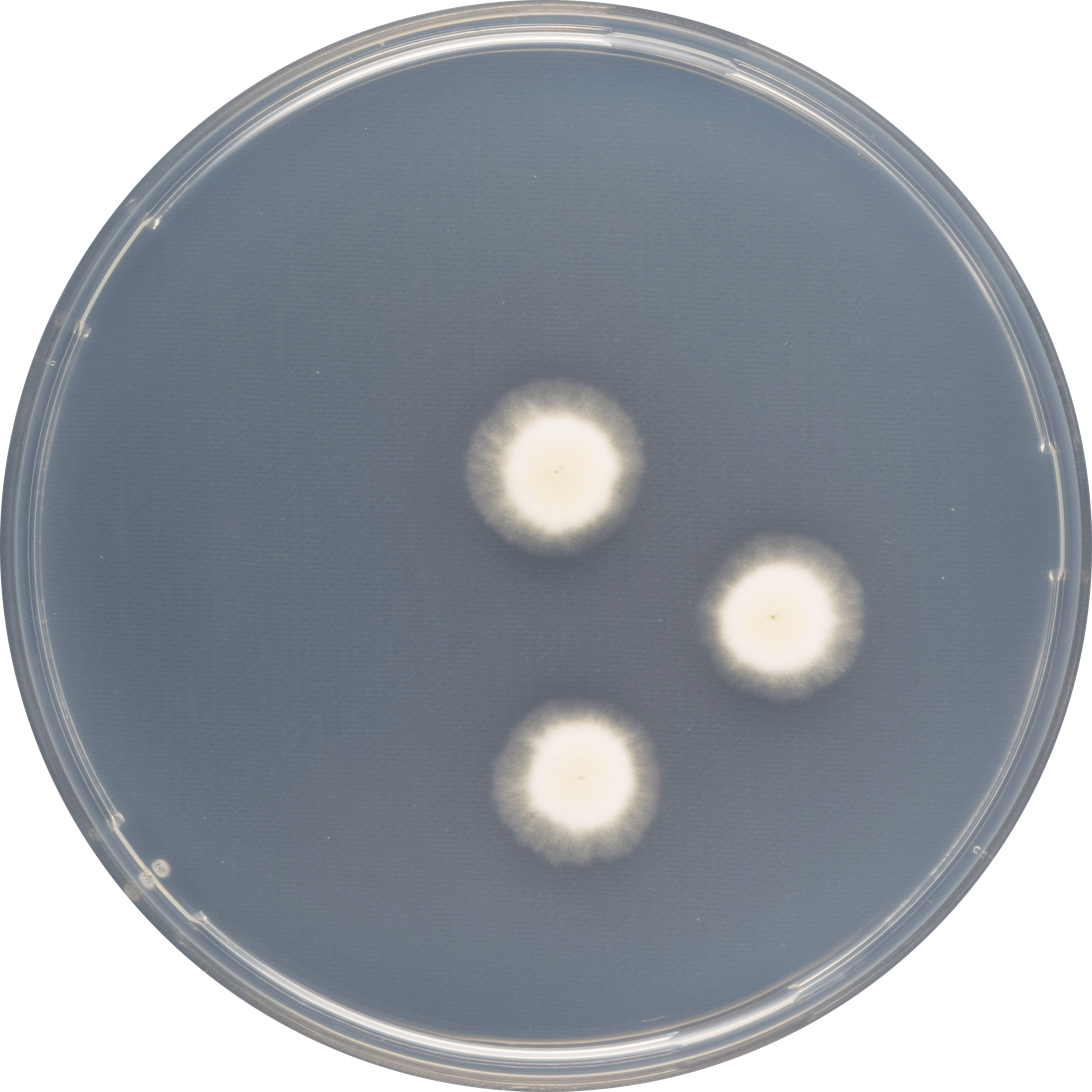
Aspergillus haitiensis growing on CYA plate

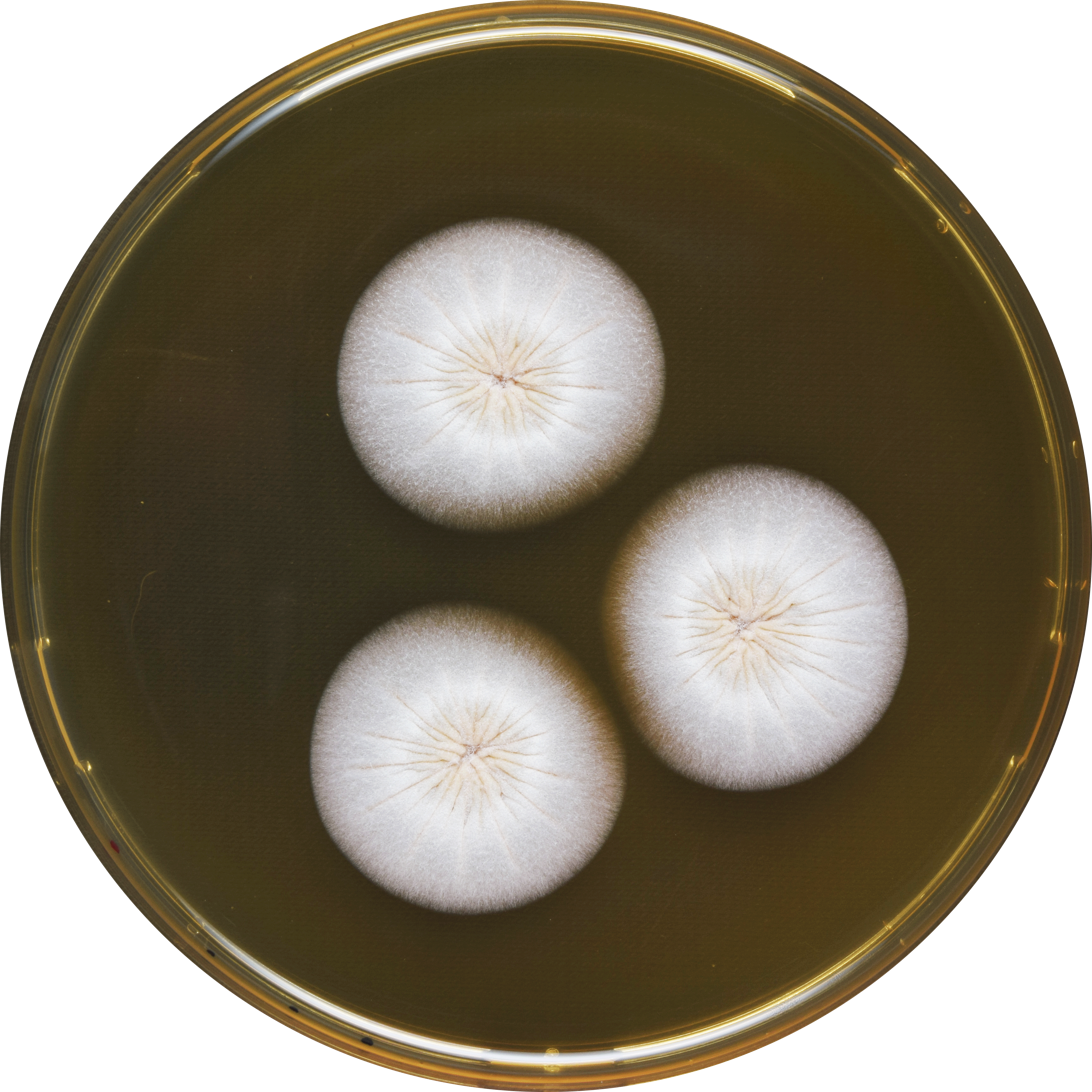
Aspergillus haitiensis growing on MEAOX plate
