= Aspergillus turkensis =

Scientific classification
- Kingdom: Fungi
- Division: Ascomycota
- Class: Eurotiomycetes
- Order: Eurotiales
- Family: Aspergillaceae
- Genus: Aspergillus
- Species: A. turkensis

Binomial name
- Aspergillus turkensis Varga, Frisvad & Samson (2011)

Species of fungus

Aspergillus turkensis is a species of fungus in the genus Aspergillus. It is from the Usti section. The species was first described in 2011. It has been isolated from soil in Turkey. It has been reported to produce an austocystin, deflectins, emerin, and a shamixanthone.

== Growth and morphology ==
A. turkensis has been cultivated on both Czapek yeast extract agar (CYA) plates and Malt Extract Agar Oxoid® (MEAOX) plates. The growth morphology of the colonies can be seen in the pictures below.

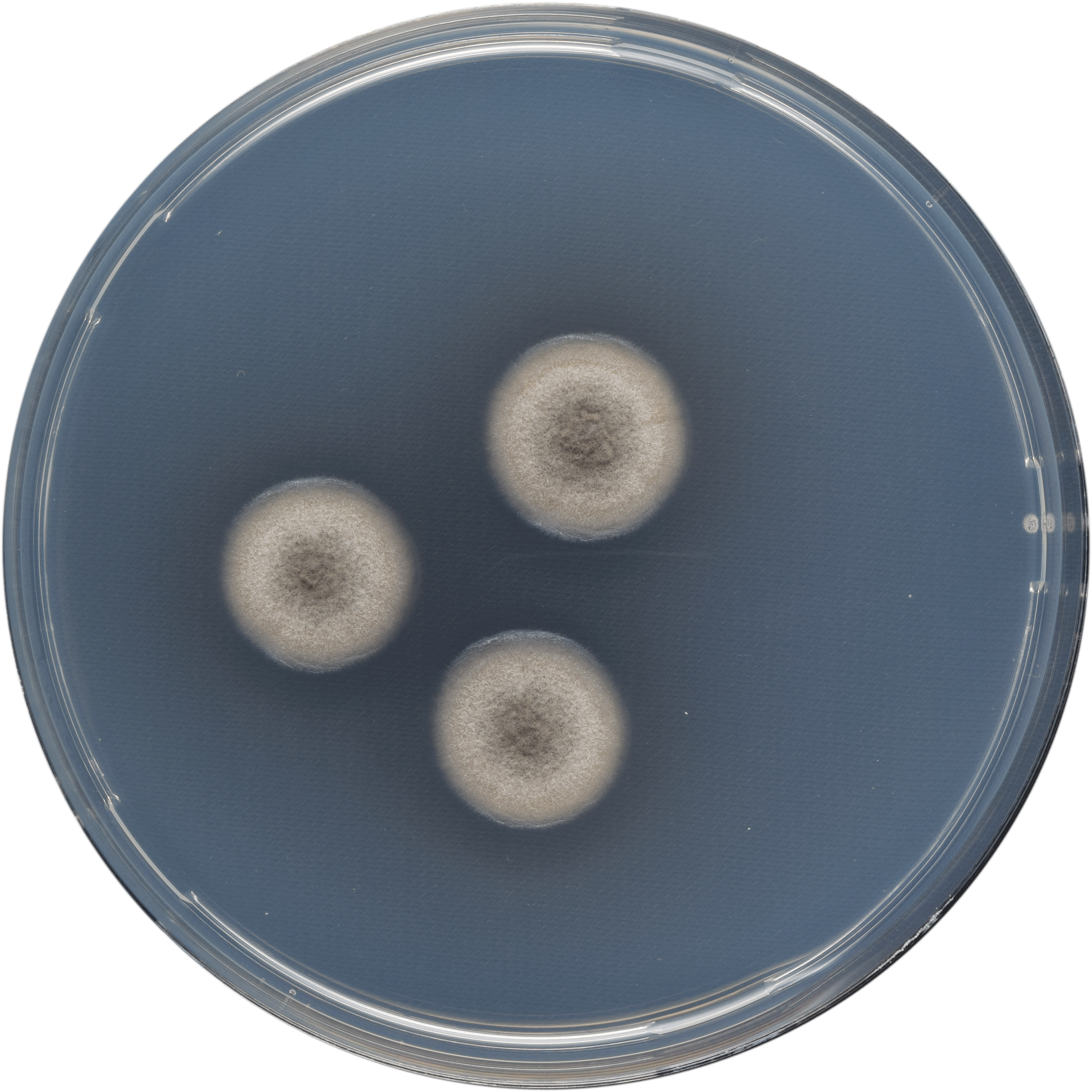
Aspergillus turkensis growing on CYA plate

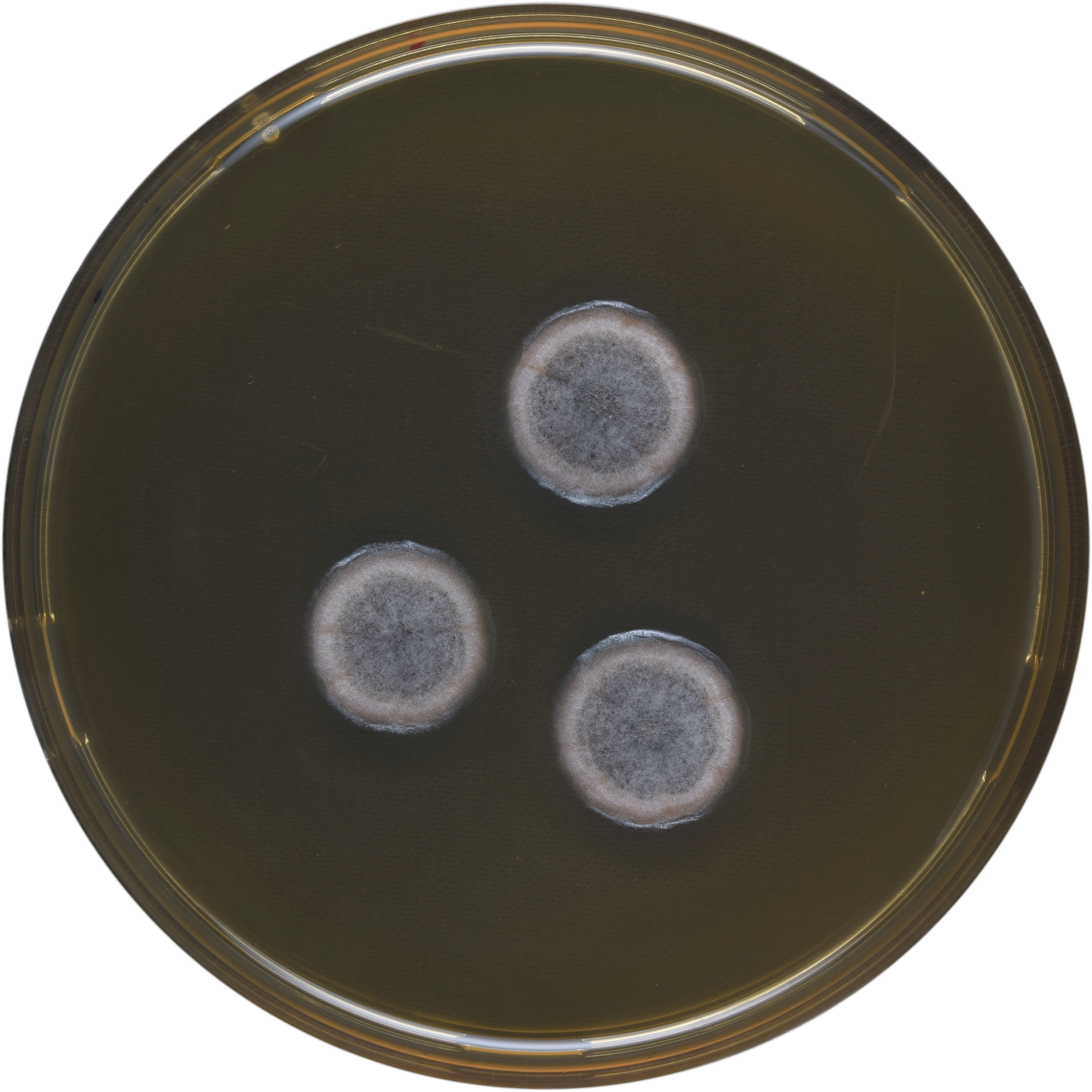
Aspergillus turkensis growing on MEAOX plate
