= C24H30O5 =

The molecular formula C_{24}H_{30}O_{5} (molar mass: 398.499 g/mol) may refer to:

- Beraprost
- Deflectin 1b
- Deflectin 2a
