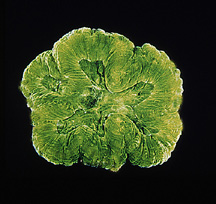

Conservation status
- Least Concern (IUCN 3.1)

- Vulnerable (NatureServe)

Scientific classification
- Kingdom: Animalia
- Phylum: Cnidaria
- Subphylum: Anthozoa
- Class: Hexacorallia
- Order: Scleractinia
- Family: Mussidae
- Genus: Isophyllia
- Species: I. sinuosa

Binomial name
- Isophyllia sinuosa (Ellis & Solander, 1786)

Synonyms
- List: Isophyllia multiflora Verrill, 1901; Madrepora sinuosa Ellis & Solander, 1786; Meandrina sinuosa (Ellis & Solander, 1786); Oulophyllia spinosa Milne Edwards & Haime, 1849

= Isophyllia sinuosa =

Species of coral

Isophyllia sinuosa, the sinuous cactus coral, is a species of stony coral in the family Mussidae. It is found in shallow water in the tropical western Atlantic and the Caribbean Sea.

== Description and habitat ==
Isophyllia sinuosa is a massive coral that forms hemispherical or dome-shaped mounds up to 20 cm (8 in) across. On the coral surface there are shallow, meandering valleys about 22 mm (0.9 in) wide separated by convoluted ridges topped with a central, pale-coloured line. The polyps are large and are situated in the valleys, often in groups of three. Although they are usually retracted into their corallites by day, they are unable to retract completely, giving the coral a fleshy feel when touched. The septa that radiate from the corallites are spiny. At night, when the polyps are fully extended, the coral has a fuzzy appearance. The ridges and valleys are usually made up of contrasting colours. These combinations include green/yellow, green/blue, purplish-blue/white and two shades of brown.

== Distribution ==
Isophyllia sinuosa is found in the tropical west Atlantic. Its range includes the southern part of the Gulf of Mexico, the Caribbean Sea, southern Florida, the Lesser Antilles, the Bahamas and Bermuda. It occurs on both back and fore reef slopes, on rocks, in lagoons and among seagrasses at depths down to about 15 metres (49 ft).

== Biology ==
At night, the polyps of Isophyllia sinuosa extend their tentacles to feed on zooplankton. This coral is a zooxanthellate species, which means that it harbours symbiotic dinoflagellates (unicellular algae) in its tissues. These contain chlorophyll and can provide the coral with organic carbon compounds by photosynthesis. These are important to the coral and provide up to 50% of its nutrient requirements. A well-lit position is essential to zooxanthellate corals and Isophyllia sinuosa is one of the most aggressive corals, defending itself from the risk of being overshadowed. It is reported to attack other corals or sponges in its close vicinity using an extracoelentric feeding mechanism in which specialised filament-like tentacles extend onto the living tissues of the neighbouring organisms, secreting enzymes which digest them in situ.

== Status ==
Isophyllia sinuosa has a wide range but is generally an uncommon species. It is considered by the IUCN Red List of Threatened Species to be of "Least Concern" as its population is believed to be stable. It is prone to bleaching, when a coral expels its zooxanthellae under stressful conditions, to black band disease, and to white plague. As a shallow water species it shares the threats posed to coral reefs in general which include a rise in sea temperatures, ocean acidification, coral diseases, storm damage, sedimentation, and human activities.
