= Barabattoai =

Scientific classification
- Domain: Eukaryota
- Kingdom: Animalia
- Phylum: Cnidaria
- Class: Hexacorallia
- Order: Scleractinia
- Family: Faviidae
- Genus: Barabattoai; Yabe & Sugiyama, 1941

Genus of corals

Barabattoai is a genus of cnidarians belonging to the family Faviidae.

Species:

- Barabattoai amicorum (Milne-Edwards & Haime, 1850)
- Barabattoai laddi (Wells, 1954)
- Barabattoai mirabilis Yabe & Sugiyama, 1941
