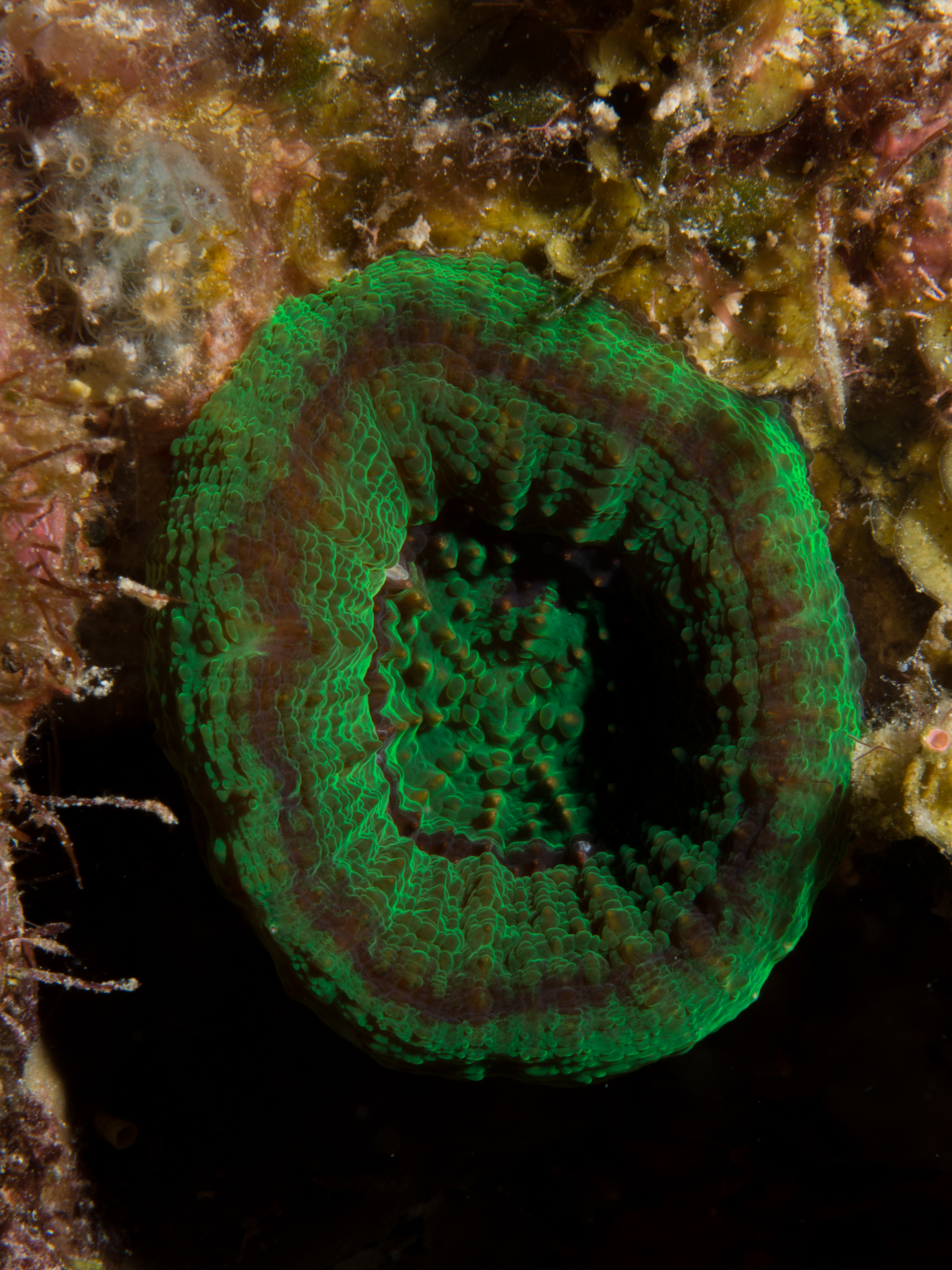
- Scolymia cubensis

Scientific classification
- Kingdom: Animalia
- Phylum: Cnidaria
- Subphylum: Anthozoa
- Class: Hexacorallia
- Order: Scleractinia
- Family: Mussidae
- Genus: Scolymia; Haime, 1852

Species
- See text

Synonyms
- Lithophyllia Milne Edwards, 1857

= Scolymia =

Genus of corals

Scolymia, commonly called scoly coral, is a genus of large-polyp stony corals (Scleractinia). These animals are believed date back to the Miocene with three extant species present in the western Atlantic Ocean, Caribbean Sea, and Gulf of Mexico.

== Description ==
Unlike most other Scleractinia, Scolymia are solitary corals. Polyps can grow up to 10 cm in diameter. Morphology is diverse with both interspecific and intraspecific variation in shape. Polyps may be concave, convex, or flat depending on the species and environmental conditions. Species are generally distinguished based on differences in septa number, thickness, and orientation. Scoly corals range from brown to bright fluorescent greens, reds, and purples.

Members of this genus are commonly found in reef aquariums because of their slow growth, however separation from other corals is necessary due to intense competition. The slow growth rate of these corals is not well understood, but researchers have proposed that cyanobacterial mats may inhibit their growth or even cause shrinkage.

== Ecology ==
=== Energy ===
Scolymia harness their energy mainly through a symbiotic relationship with zooxanthellate, a group of photosynthetic dinoflagellates. To a lesser degree, these corals can also feed heterotrophically using their tentacles to catch plankton drifting through the water at night.

=== Habitat and geographic distribution ===
All Scolymia species are located in the Atlantic Ocean along the east coast of the Americas between Florida, through the Caribbean sea and Gulf of Mexico, and as far south as Brazil. At higher latitudes, Scolymia tends to grow faster compared to at lower latitudes, likely as a result of annual mean temperature differences. Scoly corals are typically found at the base of a reef between 10-80 m deep where there are turbid waters with low-light conditions. Scolymia anchor in soft substrates where sediment continuously accumulates. They have adapted sediment-shifting abilities by growing upward on nearly-vertical surfaces in addition to a mucus exterior that prevents sedimentation from above. This adaptation has allowed Scolymia to fill an ecological niche in which other corals are not able to survive.

=== Predation ===
Scoly corals have a unique ability to avoid both disease and predation from coralivorous fishes. The reasons for this are still largely unknown, however, it is believed that their bold colors may deter predators.

=== Conservation status ===
According to the IUCN Red List, the conservation status of Scolymia cubensis and Scolymia lacera is Critically Endangered, and Scolymia wellsii is Vulnerable. While there are no specific known threats to Scolymia, corals in general are sensitive to rising temperatures brought on by climate change, resulting in coral bleaching. It is possible that Scolymia, relatively deep habitat preference helps protect it from temperature-related damage.

== Behavior ==
=== Interspecific competition ===
Some scoly corals are known to exhibit interspecific aggression by attacking both congeneric species and other corals, causing them to expel their zooxanthellates. Generally, S. lacera defeats and kills S. cubensis.

=== Reproduction ===
Scolymia reproduce sexually through broadcast spawning. Because of their lack of immune-recognition, it is possible for gametes from the same individual to fertilize each other, resulting in less genetic diversity. Fertilized planktonic larvae drift through the current before settling on a reef bed.

=== Intraspecific fusion ===
When two or more Scolymia cubensis larvae settle near one another, they usually fuse together to form one complex coral with distinct genotypes.

== Taxonomy ==
=== Species ===
The World Register of Marine Species includes the following species in the genus:

- "Artichoke coral" Scolymia cubensis (Milne Edwards & Haime, 1848)
- "Atlantic mushroom coral" Scolymia lacera (Pallas, 1766)
- "Solitary disk coral" Scolymia wellsii (Laborel, 1967)

Other species were previously classified under Scolymia but have since been reclassified to distinct genera:

- Cynarina lacrymalis - Basionym: Scolymia lacrymalis (Milne Edwards & Haime, 1848)
- Homophyllia australis - Basionym: Scolymia australis (Milne Edwards & Haime, 1848)
- Lobophyllia vitiensis - Basionym: Scolymia vitiensis (Brüggemann, 1877)
