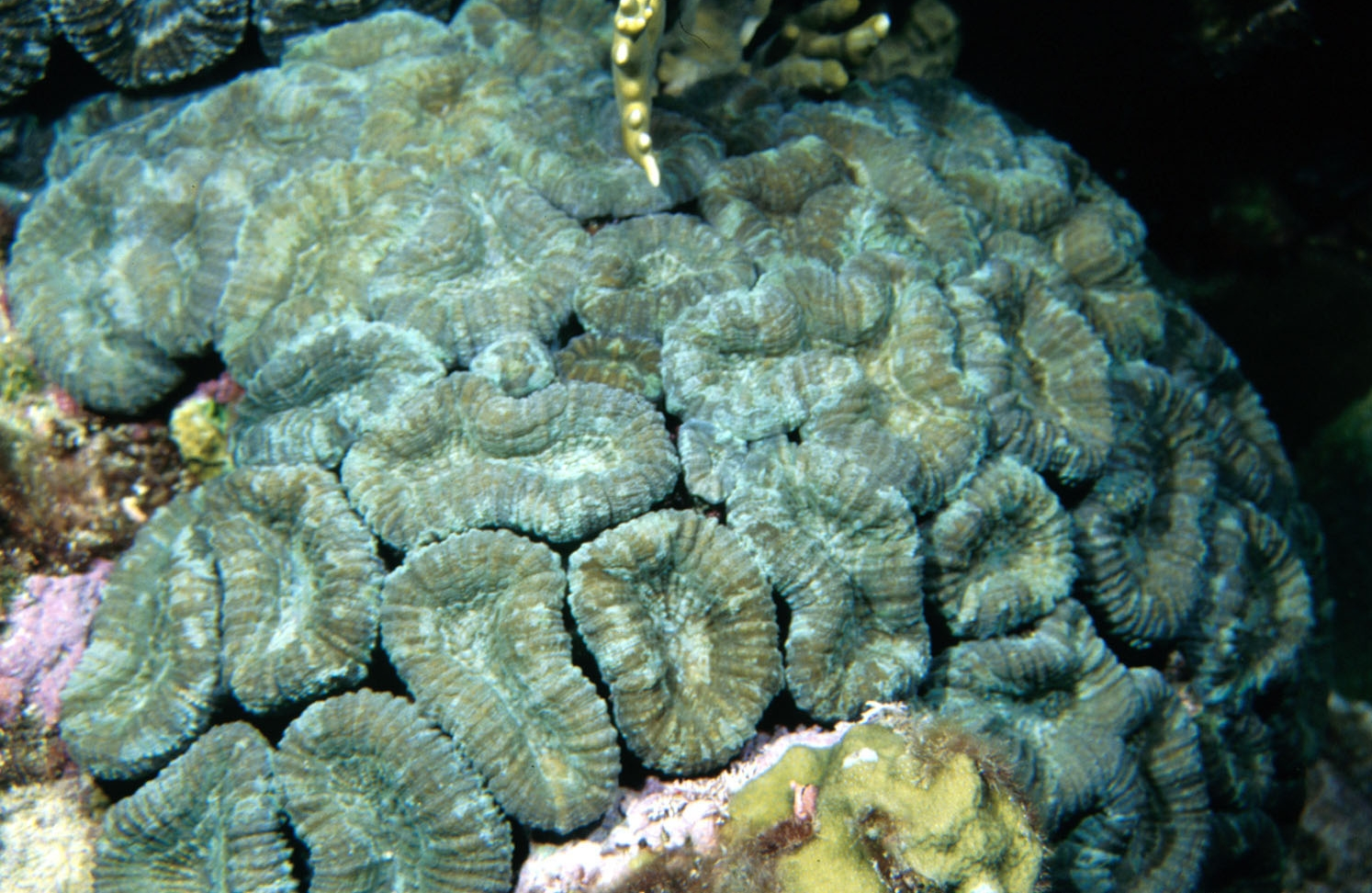

Conservation status
- Near Threatened (IUCN 3.1)

Scientific classification
- Kingdom: Animalia
- Phylum: Cnidaria
- Subphylum: Anthozoa
- Class: Hexacorallia
- Order: Scleractinia
- Family: Faviidae
- Genus: Mussa; Oken, 1815
- Species: M. angulosa

Binomial name
- Mussa angulosa (Pallas, 1766)

Synonyms
- Caryophyllia angulosa (Pallas, 1766); Lithodendron Schweigger, 1819; Lithodendrum Agassiz, 1846; Lithophyllia argemone Duchassaing & Michelotti, 1860; Lithophyllia cylindrica Duchassaing & Michelotti, 1860; Lithophyllia dubia Duchassaing & Michelotti, 1860; Lobophyllia angulosa (Pallas, 1766); Lobophyllia carduus (Ellis & Solander, 1786); Madrepora angulosa Pallas, 1766 · unaccepted; Madrepora carduus Ellis & Solander, 1786; Madrepora fastigiata Ellis & Solander, 1786; Mussa angulosa f. angulosa (Pallas, 176; Mussa carduus (Ellis & Solander, 1786); Mussa fastigiata (Ellis & Solander, 1786); Scolymia dubia (Duchassaing & Michelotti, 1860)

= Mussa angulosa =

Species of coral

Mussa is a genus of stony coral in the family Faviidae. It is monotypic, being represented by the single species Mussa angulosa, commonly known as the spiny or large flower coral. It is found on reefs in shallow waters in the Caribbean Sea, the Bahamas and the Gulf of Mexico.

== Description ==
Mussa angulosa is a colonial species and the whole clump forms a low dome that may reach 50 centimetres (20 in) across. The corallites are phaceloid, that is they have a tubular form growing from a common base, in series of one to three, or occasionally up to five. The individual corallites are large, being 25 to 45 mm (1.0 to 1.8 in) in diameter and up to 6 mm (0.2 in) high. There are four cycles of septa in each corallite, nearly equal in size; they are narrow and curved, with wide spacing. The individual polyps are very large, sometimes reaching a length of 12 centimetres (4.7 in) and a diameter of 4 centimetres (1.6 in). They completely obscure the short branches of the stony skeleton on which they occur. During the day the polyps appear fleshy, but during the night they expand further and each is fringed by a rim of short tentacles. The colour of the polyps is variable, being grey or pale brown with green, pink and purple shades. The tissues of this coral contain symbiotic single-celled algae called zooxanthellae. These are photosynthetic and absorb energy from the sun to create organic compounds which are used by the coral.

== Distribution ==
Mussa angulosa occurs in the Caribbean Sea, the Gulf of Mexico and the Bahamas, and on reefs and banks off the coast of Texas and southern Florida. It is found in water between 3 and 60 metres (10 and 197 ft) deep but most often between 10 and 30 metres (33 and 98 ft).

== Biology ==
Mussa angulosa is a reef-building species and is aggressive, attacking other fast-growing corals that start to grow close by and threaten to overgrow it or shade it. Its cnidocytes are so powerful that no other Caribbean corals can successfully attack it. It leans away from the current as it grows and reacts adversely to increased sedimentation.

== Status ==
There are no specific threats facing this coral and the IUCN Red List of Threatened Species lists it as being near threatened. It is however probably declining because of the degradation of coral reefs by mechanical damage, climate change and ocean acidification. It is susceptible to coral bleaching and the coral diseases that affect stressed corals. Off the coasts of the United States it is present in various marine parks and other conservation areas, in both of which it is protected.
