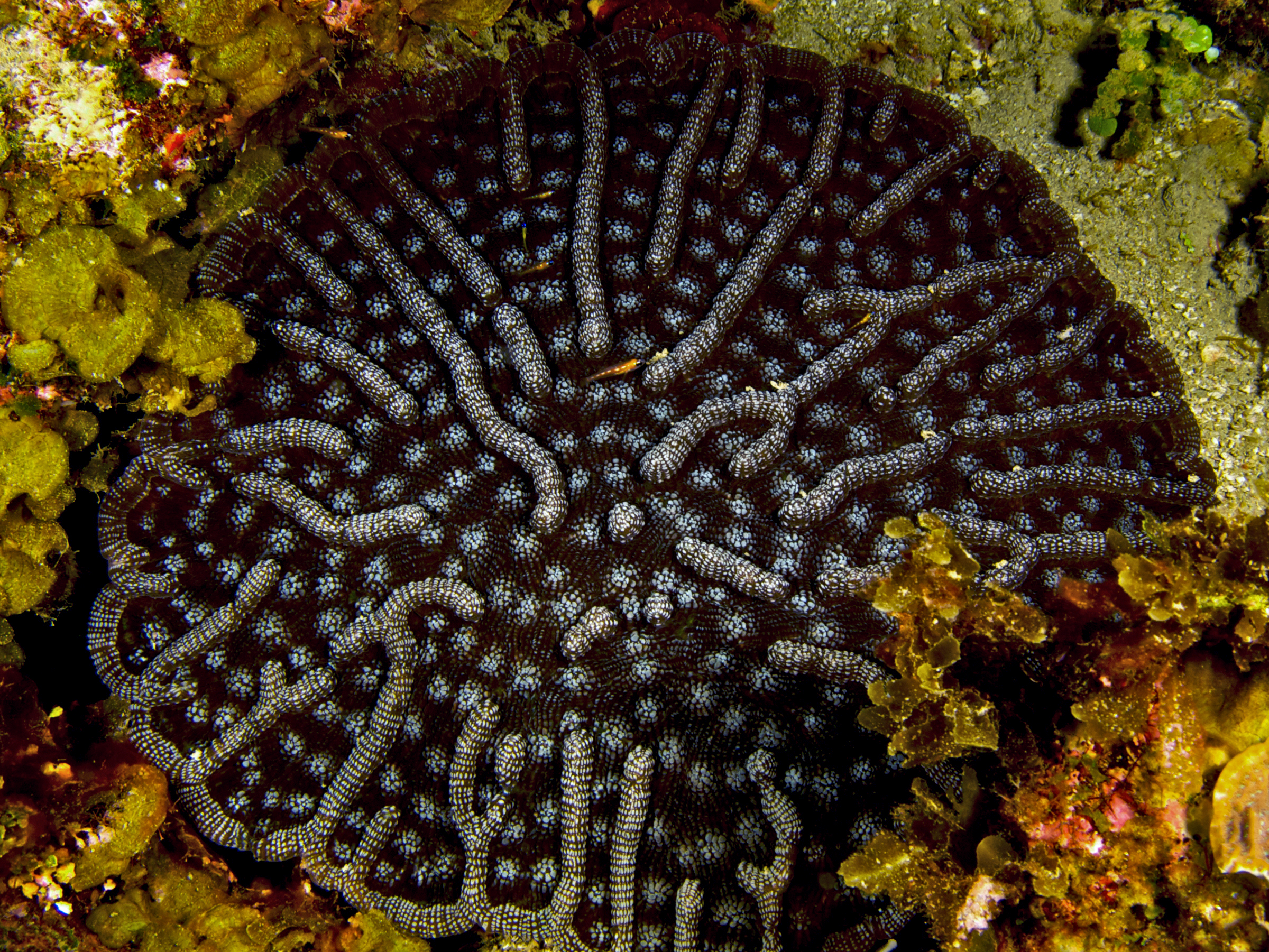
- Mycetophyllia aliciae

Scientific classification
- Kingdom: Animalia
- Phylum: Cnidaria
- Subphylum: Anthozoa
- Class: Hexacorallia
- Order: Scleractinia
- Family: Mussidae
- Genus: Mycetophyllia; Milne-Edwards & Haime, 1848

Species
- See text

= Mycetophyllia =

Genus of corals

Mycetophyllia is a genus of stony corals in the family Mussidae. The genera are native to the Caribbean Sea and sometimes kept in reef aquariums. Like all corals in the family Mussidae, Mycetophyllia are hermatypic, or reef-building corals. They receive nutrients from their symbiotic relationship with zooxanthellae, which are single-celled photosynthetic dinoflagellates. They are passive suspension feeders that feed on organic matter suspended in the water column.

== Morphology ==
These coral colonies have flat disc-like or dome structures with scalloped edges. They also have corallites which cover the surface radially towards the center. Depending on the species, they may have a pattern of valleys and ridges on their surface. They are often brown, green, or grey in color and are identified by their thin plates and irregular ridge pattern. There are five known species within Mycetophyllia each with unique morphological features. Mycetophyllia aliciae is characterized by a thin, scalloped plate. M. aliciae does not have defined valleys and ridges like other species. This species reaches a maximum diameter of 1 meter. Mycetophyllia danaana is the smallest species of the genera with a diameter of 30 centimeters. M. danaana colonies have thick plates with deep narrow ridges. M. ferox has thin plates with distinctive ridges and valleys across the surface. The maximum diameter is 1 meter. M. lamarckiana forms small, round mounds rather than a plate. Valleys stretch across the surface and the species is usually light brown or grey in color. M. reesi has the thinnest plate of the all Mycetophyllia species with no ridges and a smooth surface.

== Distribution ==
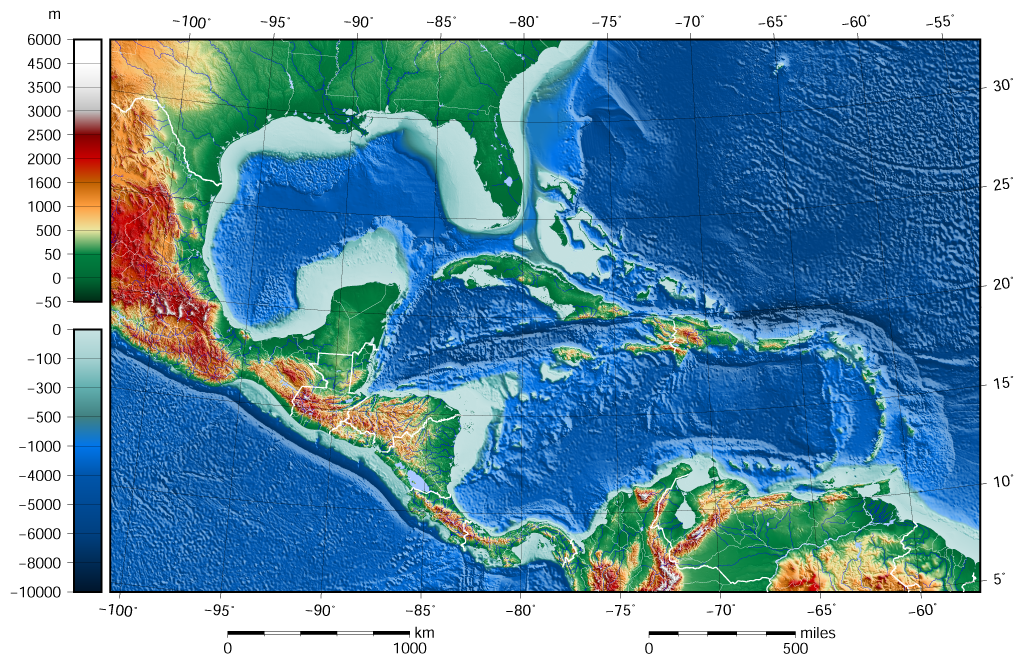
Caribbean Sea and Gulf of Mexico bathymetric map

Mycetophyllia is a genus native to the Caribbean sea, southern Gulf of Mexico, southern Florida, and the Bahamas. The geographic range is between the Tropic of Cancer and the equator at latitudes 10-25°N and longitudes 60-80°W. These stony corals occupy benthic rocky substrates and are hermatypic, or reef-building corals. These corals are most abundant at depths of 10–25 meters; however, distribution greatly varies by species. The M. reesi species occupies the greatest depths found in deep-water fore reefs from 20 to 76 meters.

== Life cycle ==
Like many stony corals, these corals are hermaphroditic, with some species possessing both male and female reproductive organs. Sexually mature corals produce gametes through meiosis. They begin their life cycle as polyps, or small, cylindrical marine invertebrates. When environmental conditions are favorable, polyps release sperm into the water column which allows new coral colonies to be fertilized through external fertilization. Coral spawning occurs once a year during a full moon. After fertilization, the egg, called a zygote, drifts through the water and undergoes cell division in mitosis. An embryo develops into a planula larva, a type of microscopic zooplankton. The coral planula moves with tiny cilia that cover the body until it finds a hard substrate suitable for settlement.

== Conservation ==
Widespread threats are causing coral populations to decline worldwide. Factors such as habitat loss, disease, warming ocean temperatures, and physical destruction are contributing to reduced coral populations worldwide. Localized threats include human development, invasive species, unsustainable fishing practices, and pollution. Stony corals throughout the Caribbean are greatly threatened by habitat loss and susceptible to disease. White band disease has led to coral deaths in this region. Scientists are still unsure on the cause of white band disease, which is identified by peeling tissue and an exposed white skeleton.

== Species ==
The World Register of Marine Species recognizes the following species in the genus Mycetophyllia:

- Knobby cactus coral (Mycetophyllia aliciae) Wells, 1973
- Low-ridge cactus coral (Mycetophyllia danaana) Milne Edwards & Haime, 1849
- Rough cactus coral (Mycetophyllia ferox) Wells, 1973
- Ridged cactus coral (Mycetophyllia lamarckiana) Milne Edwards & Haime, 1848
- Ridgeless cactus coral (Mycetophyllia reesi) Wells, 1973
