= Aspergillus deflectus =

Scientific classification
- Kingdom: Fungi
- Division: Ascomycota
- Class: Eurotiomycetes
- Order: Eurotiales
- Family: Aspergillaceae
- Genus: Aspergillus
- Species: A. deflectus

Binomial name
- Aspergillus deflectus Fennell & Raper (1955)

Type strain
- ATCC 16807, CBS 109.55, IMI 61448, NRRL 2206, QM 1904, UC4638, WB 2206

Species of fungus

Aspergillus deflectus is a species of fungus in the genus Aspergillus. It produces a group of antimicrobial chemical compounds known as deflectins. Aspergillus deflectus is in rare cases pathogenic. It is from the Usti section.

== Growth and morphology ==
A. deflectus has been cultivated on both Czapek yeast extract agar (CYA) plates and Malt Extract Agar Oxoid (MEAOX) plates. The growth morphology of the colonies can be seen in the pictures below.

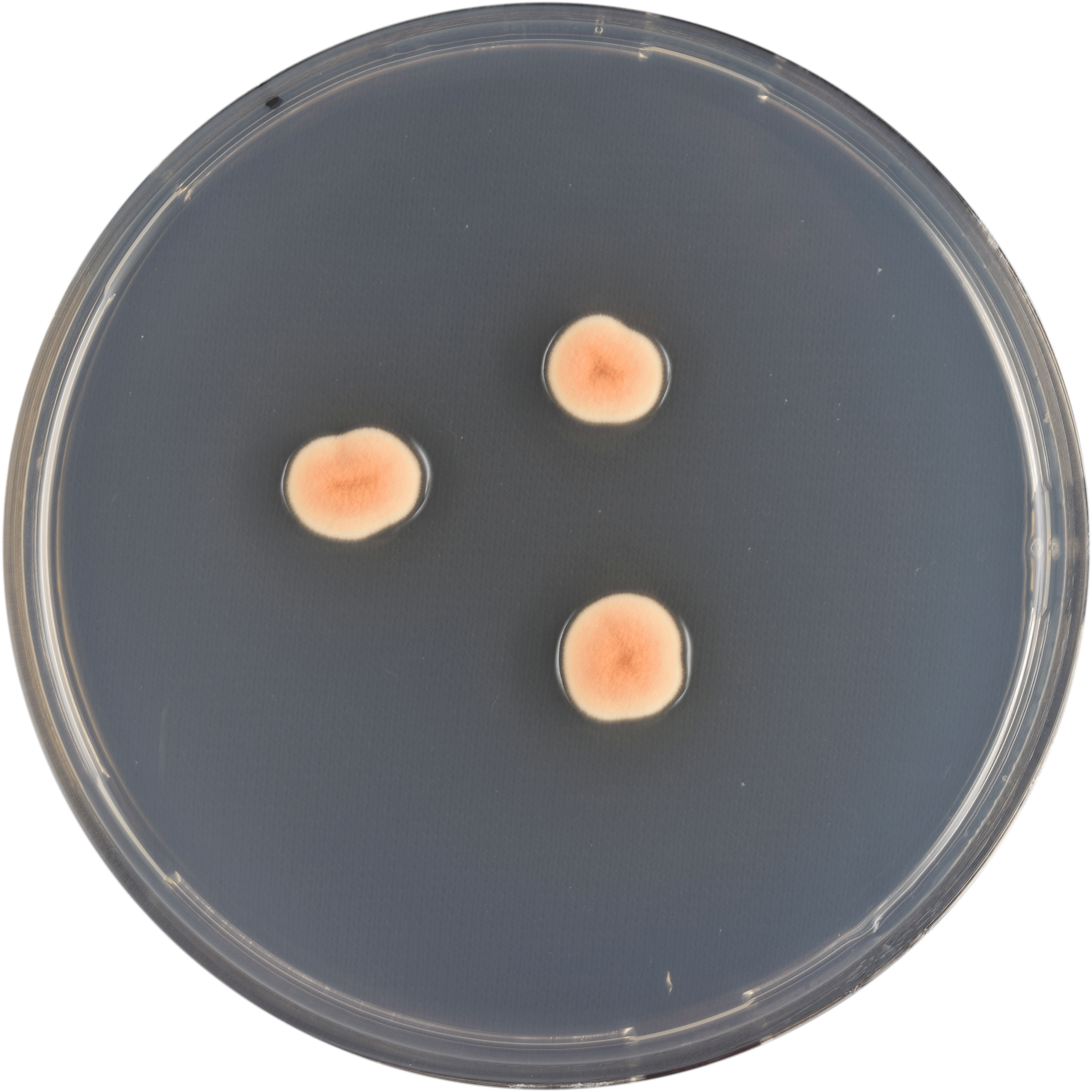
Aspergillus deflectus growing on CYA plate

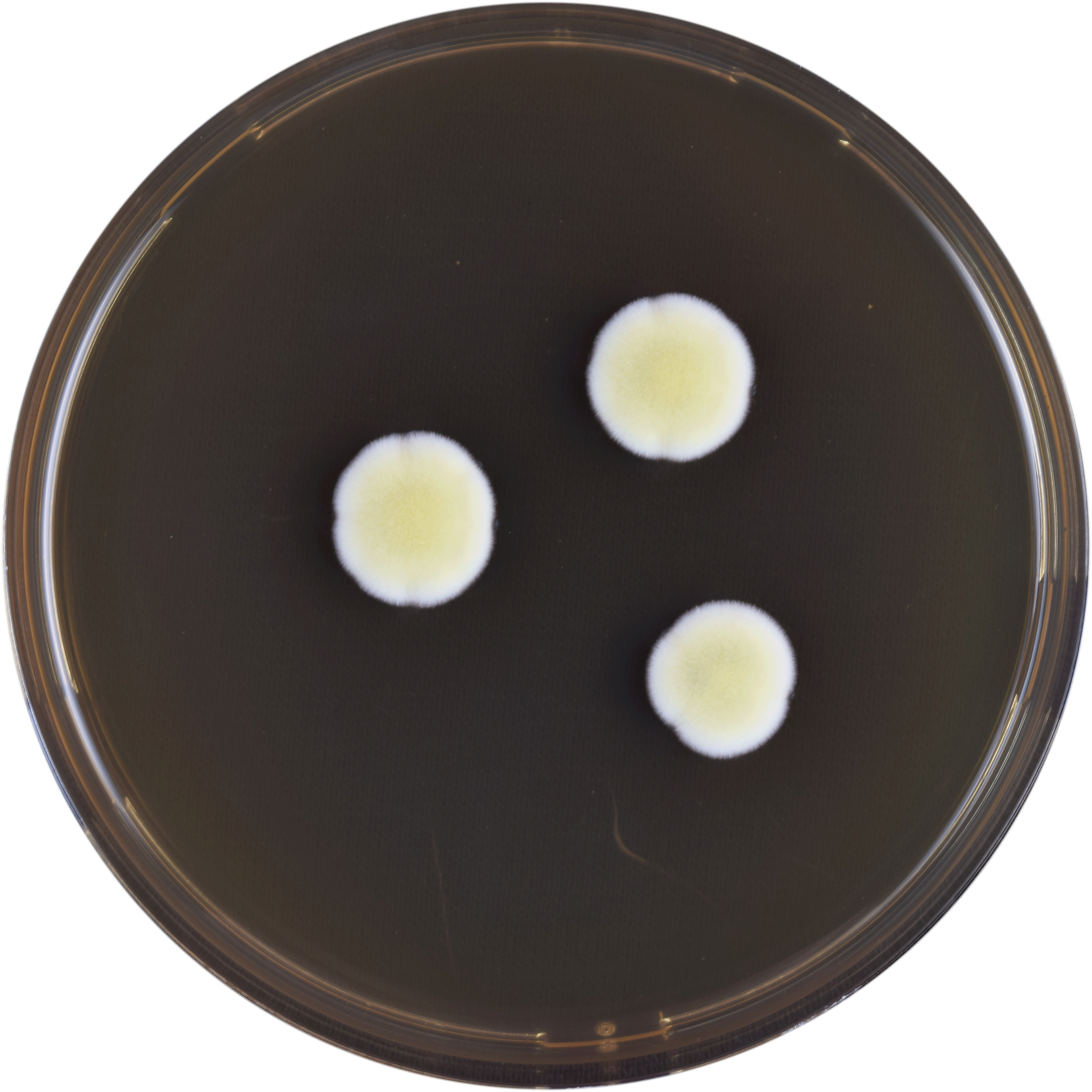
Aspergillus deflectus growing on MEAOX plate
