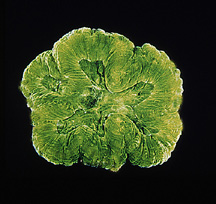
- Isophyllia sinuosa

Scientific classification
- Kingdom: Animalia
- Phylum: Cnidaria
- Subphylum: Anthozoa
- Class: Hexacorallia
- Order: Scleractinia
- Family: Mussidae
- Genus: Isophyllia; Milne Edwards & Haime, 1851

Species
- See text

Synonyms
- Isophyllastraea; Isophyllastrea Matthai, 1928; Mussa (Isophyllia) Milne Edwards & Haime, 1851

= Isophyllia =

Genus of corals

Isophyllia is a genus of stony coral in the subfamily Mussinae of the family Mussidae.

== Characteristics ==
Isophyllia is a colonial coral. Budding is always intracalicular, occurring inside the oral disc of the polyp, within the whorl of tentacles. The corallites are meandroid, that is, they are linked in a short series of up to five centres. The individual corallites are medium-sized, being 2.5 to 5 mm (0.1 to 0.2 in) in diameter and up to 6 mm (0.2 in) high. There are three or more cycles of septa in each corallite, all equal in size. A narrow costate coenosteum separates the corallites.

== Species ==
The World Register of Marine Species lists the following species :

- Isophyllia rigida (Dana, 1848)
- Isophyllia sinuosa (Ellis & Solander, 1786)
