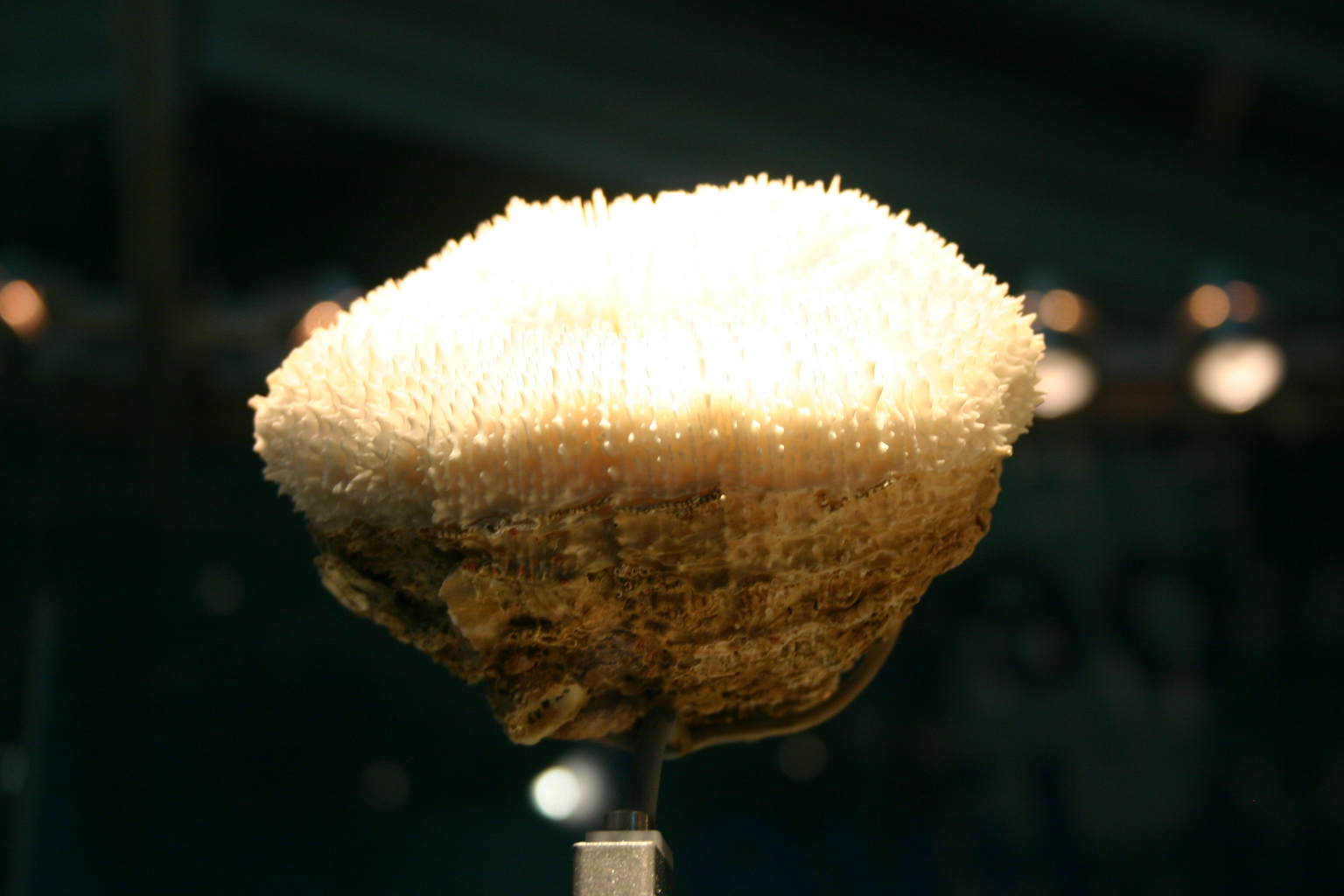

Conservation status
- Critically Endangered (IUCN 3.1)

- Vulnerable (NatureServe)

Scientific classification
- Kingdom: Animalia
- Phylum: Cnidaria
- Subphylum: Anthozoa
- Class: Hexacorallia
- Order: Scleractinia
- Family: Mussidae
- Genus: Scolymia
- Species: S. lacera

Binomial name
- Scolymia lacera (Pallas 1766)

Synonyms
- Lithophyllia lacera (Pallas, 1766); Madrepora lacera Pallas, 1766; Mussa lacera (Pallas, 1766)

= Scolymia lacera =

Species of coral

Scolymia lacera, the fleshy disk coral, is a species of stony coral in the family Mussidae. It occurs on reefs in shallow waters in the Caribbean Sea, the Gulf of Mexico, the Bahamas, Bermuda and southern Florida.

== Description ==
Scolymia lacera is a coral with a single, solitary polyp and does not increase in size by budding as do colonial species of coral. It is a small species with a diameter of up to 6 centimetres (2.4 in). The radially-running ridges in the stony cup which it secretes can be seen through the fleshy body of the polyp. Its colour is variable and is usually some shade of greenish-brown. Scolymia lacera is very similar in appearance to Scolimia cubensis which occupies much the same range. The differences are mostly in the layout of the septa, the miniature ridges in the calcareous calyces in which the polyps sit. S. lacera tends to occupy better lit positions while S. cubensis is in less well lit locations. Where the two come in contact, S. lacera is more aggressive.

== Distribution and habitat ==
Scolymia lacera is found in the Caribbean Sea, the southern half of the Gulf of Mexico, the Bahamas and southern Florida. It grows on reefs, rocky outcrops and steep reef slopes at depths of between 15 and 80 metres (49 and 262 ft).

== Biology ==
Scolymia lacera contains single-celled symbiotic algae called zooxanthellae in its tissues. These are photosynthetic and use energy from the sun to produce organic compounds from which the coral also benefits. Much of its energy needs are supplied in this way but it also extends its ring of short tentacles to catch plankton, feeding mostly at night. Scolymia lacera is an aggressive coral that attacks neighbouring corals that might deprive it of light. It does this by extruding filaments several centimetres long from its mesenteries. When these come in contact with another coral they secrete enzymes that in the course of several hours digest its soft tissues. Smaller corals may be killed by this attack while larger individuals may have the part within reach stripped back to the skeleton.

== Status ==
The IUCN Red List of Threatened Species lists this species as being critically endangered. Some of the factors affecting corals are a rise in sea temperature and consequent coral bleaching, increased severity of storms, ocean acidification, coral disease and various human impacts.
