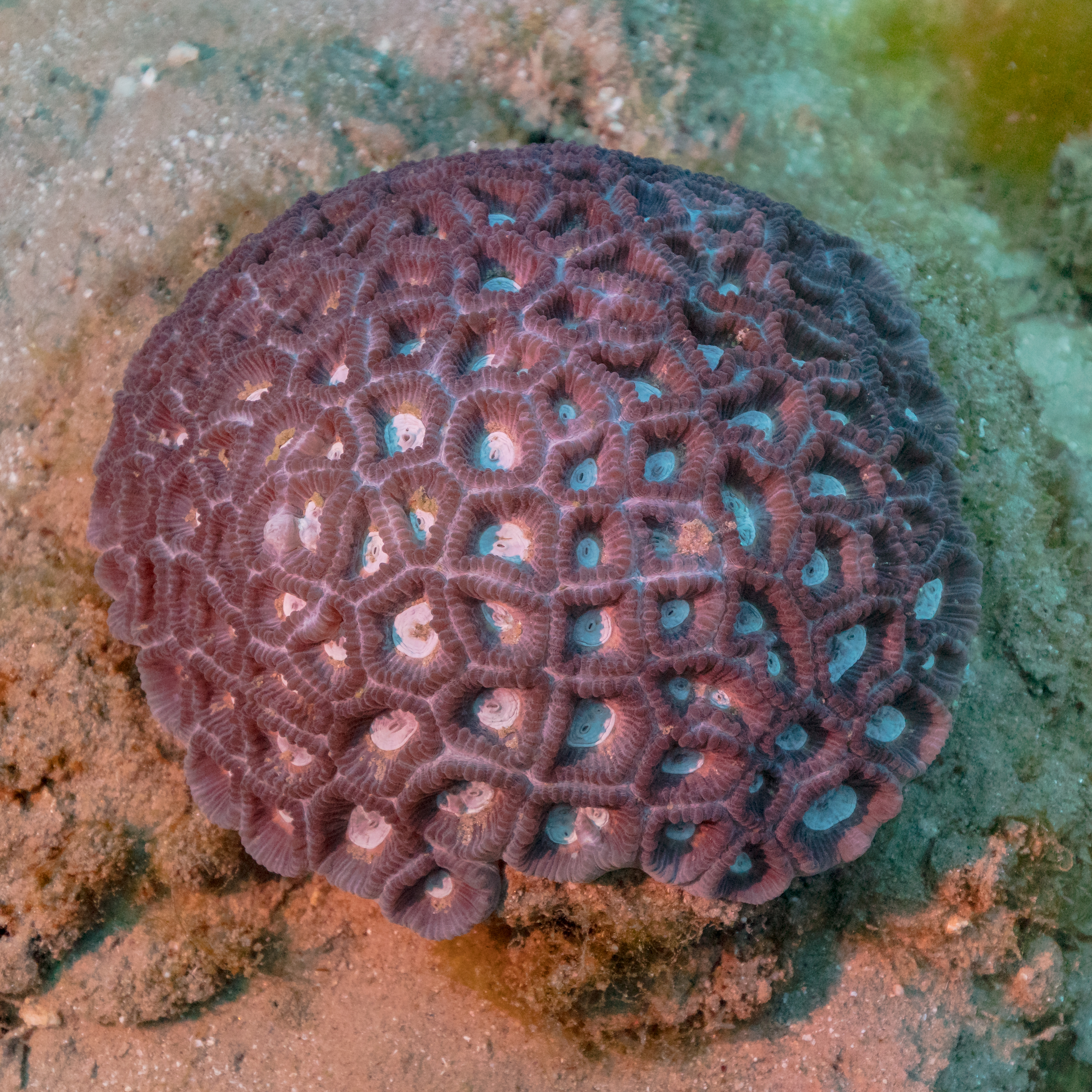
- Favia favus, Red Sea, Egypt

Scientific classification
- Kingdom: Animalia
- Phylum: Cnidaria
- Subphylum: Anthozoa
- Class: Hexacorallia
- Order: Scleractinia
- Family: Faviidae
- Genus: Favia; Milne Edwards, 1857

Species
- See text

Synonyms
- Favia Oken, 1815

= Favia =

Genus of corals

Favia is a genus of reef-building stony corals in the family Mussidae. Members of the genus are massive or thickly encrusting colonial corals, either dome-shaped or flat, and a few are foliaceous. There is a great diversity of form even among individuals of the same species. The corallites project slightly above the surface of the coral and each has its own wall. In most species, the corallites are plocoid and in some, monocentric. The septa and costae linked to the corallite wall are well developed and covered by fine teeth. The polyps only extend and feed during the night. Each one has a small number of tapering tentacles which often have a darker coloured tip; these are called stinger tentacles, or sweeper tentacles. They use these to sweep the water to see if any other coral is in its area; if so, then they begin to sting the other coral. This is commonly known as coral war. Each coral is trying to make sure it has enough room around it so it can continue to grow and have more surface area for its offspring. The columella is parietal and spongy, and there are vesicles on both the endotheca and exotheca. Members of this genus are widespread in both the Atlantic Ocean and the Indo-Pacific.

== Species ==
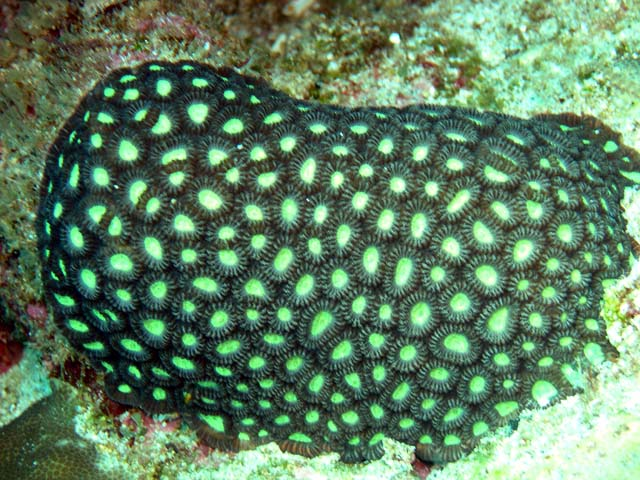
Favia sp., Pulau Aur, West Malaysia

The following species are included in the genus according to the World Register of Marine Species:

- Favia favus (Forskål, 1775)
- Favia fragum (Esper, 1795)
- Favia gravida (Verrill, 1868)
