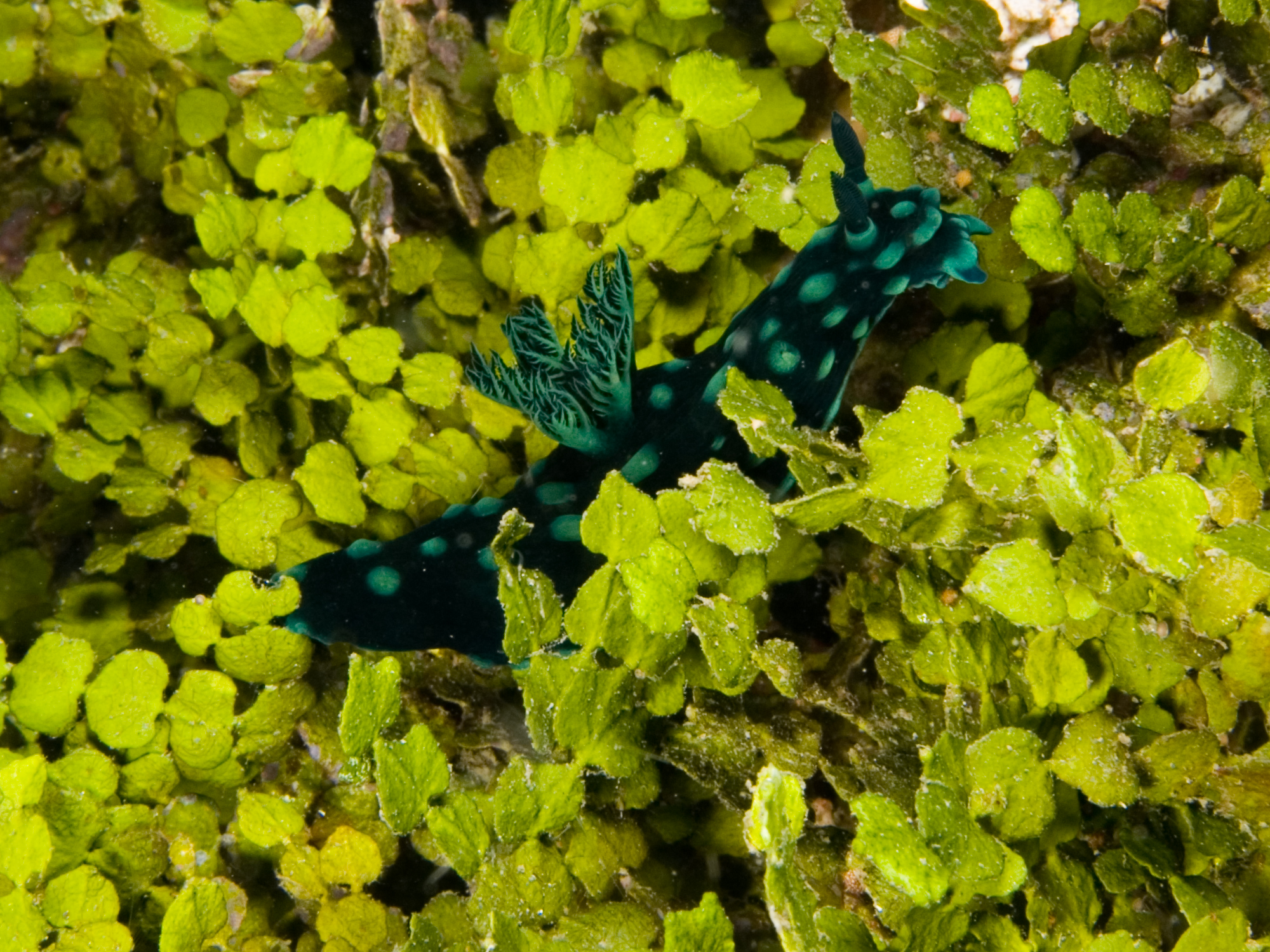
- The sea slug Nembrotha cristata on Halimeda opuntia, found in Timor Leste

Scientific classification
- Kingdom: Plantae
- Division: Chlorophyta
- Class: Ulvophyceae
- Order: Bryopsidales
- Family: Halimedaceae
- Genus: Halimeda
- Species: H. opuntia

Binomial name
- Halimeda opuntia (Linnaeus) J.V.Lamouroux, 1816

Synonyms
- Corallina opuntia Linnaeus, 1758; Flabellaria multicaulis Lamarck, 1813; Fucus prolifer M.Blanco, 1837; Halimeda cordata J.Agardh, 1887; Halimeda multicaulis (Lamarck) J.V.Lamouroux, 1816; Halimeda triloba Decaisne, 1842

= Halimeda opuntia =

Species of alga (seaweed)

Halimeda opuntia, sometimes known as the watercress alga, is a species of calcareous green seaweed in the order Bryopsidales. It is native to reefs in the Indo-Pacific region, the Atlantic Ocean and the Mediterranean Sea.

== Description ==
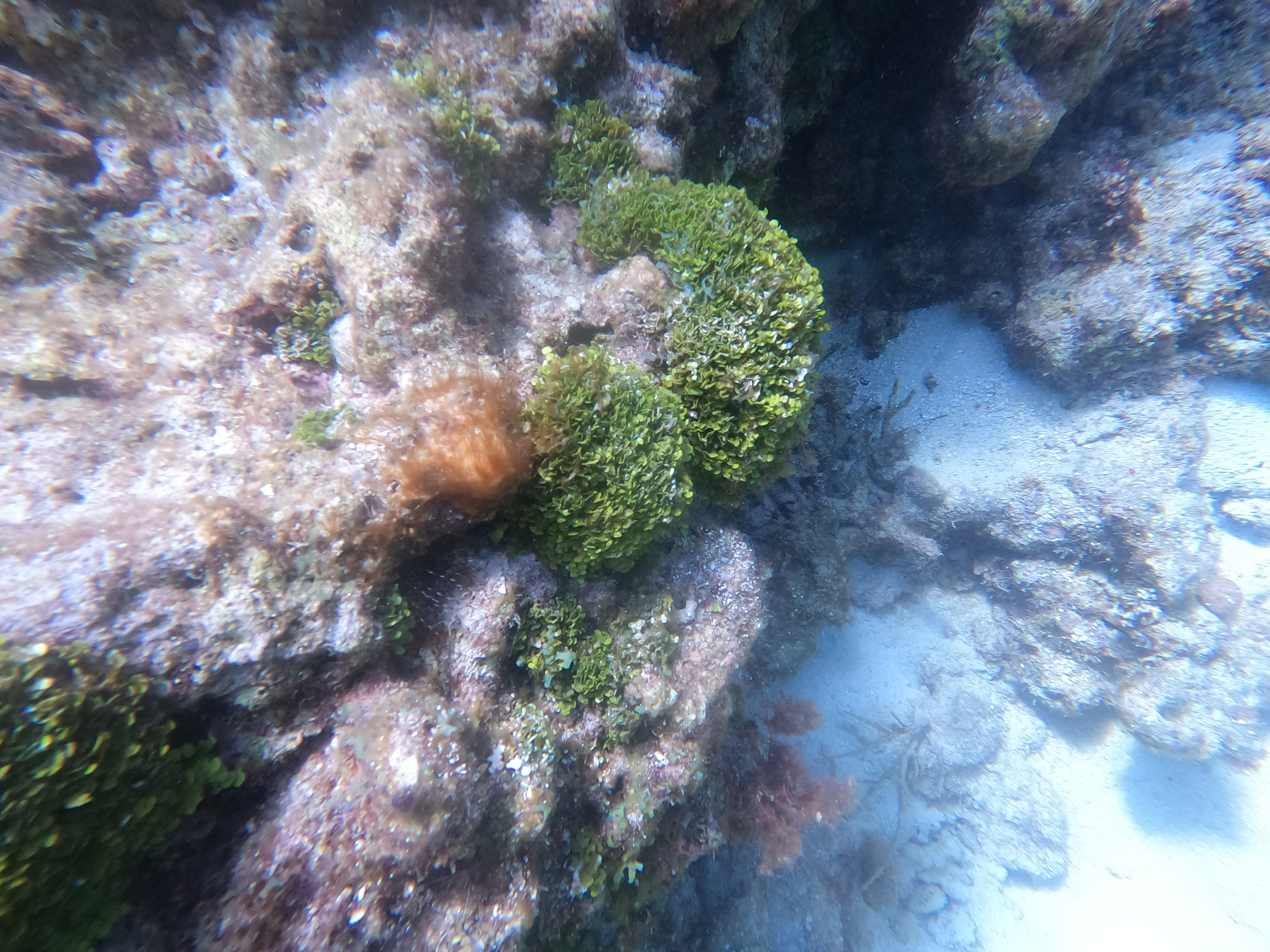
At Pickles Reef, Florida Keys

Halimeda opuntia forms thick, frequently-branched clumps of calcified, leaf-like segments up to 25 cm (10 in) high. The segments are flat and kidney- or fan-shaped, up to 8 mm (0.3 in) high and 10 mm (0.4 in) broad. They have a distinct central rib and a smooth, sinuous, or lobe-shaped, upper margin. Rhizoids grow where the segments touch the substrate. The plants are often crammed closely together forming a dense mat of herbage in which the individual plants are not easily discernible.

== Distribution and habitat ==
Halimeda opuntia is found in the Indo-Pacific Ocean, the Atlantic Ocean, the Mediterranean Sea, and the Caribbean Sea and around the coasts of Florida and the Bahamas. It grows in grooves, depressions and cracks in rocks and between coral heads in moderately protected parts of the reef, at depths down to about 55 m (180 ft).

== Ecology ==
Where degraded coral reefs have abundant macroalgae, it has been shown experimentally that the coral larvae will settle in as great quantities on the seaweed as it will on the rubble substrate. Researchers found that the larvae of Favia fragum readily settled on Halimeda opuntia, however the alga was ephemeral and therefore unsuitable for long-term survival of the coral. This settlement practice may have significant consequences for the recruitment of corals on degraded reefs.

The secondary metabolites include growth regulators such as auxins, gibberellins and cytokinins, and substances with antibacterial and antifungal properties, but these are not being harvested for commercial use.
