= Siderin =

Names
- Preferred IUPAC name 4,7-Dimethoxy-5-methyl-2H-1-benzopyran-2-one

Identifiers
CAS Number	53377-54-1
3D model (JSmol)	Interactive image
ChemSpider	161464
PubChem CID	185740
UNII	NK2BFZ89XC
CompTox Dashboard (EPA)	DTXSID30968023
- InChI: InChI=1S/C12H12O4/c1-7-4-8(14-2)5-10-12(7)9(15-3)6-11(13)16-10/h4-6H,1-3H3 Key: LLTOPKQGFAAMKH-UHFFFAOYSA-N; InChI=1/C12H12O4/c1-7-4-8(14-2)5-10-12(7)9(15-3)6-11(13)16-10/h4-6H,1-3H3 Key: LLTOPKQGFAAMKH-UHFFFAOYAR
- SMILES: O=C/2Oc1cc(OC)cc(c1C(\OC)=C\2)C

Properties
Chemical formula	C_{12}H_{12}O_{4}
Molar mass	220.224 g·mol^{−1}
- Except where otherwise noted, data are given for materials in their standard state (at 25 °C [77 °F], 100 kPa). Infobox references

Siderin is a coumarin derivative produced by Aspergillus versicolor, an endophytic fungus found in the green alga Halimeda opuntia in the Red Sea.
