= Shamixanthone =

Names
- Preferred IUPAC name (1R,2S)-1,11-Dihydroxy-5-methyl-8-(3-methylbut-2-en-1-yl)-2-(prop-1-en-2-yl)-2,3-dihydropyrano[3,2-a]xanthene-12(1H)-one

Identifiers
CAS Number	35660-46-9
3D model (JSmol)	Interactive image
ChEBI	CHEBI:64499
ChEMBL	ChEMBL469860
ChemSpider	10479697
PubChem CID	15596091
UNII	Z41V59XW4A
CompTox Dashboard (EPA)	DTXSID201045540
- InChI: InChI=1S/C25H26O5/c1-12(2)6-7-15-8-9-17(26)19-23(28)20-18(30-25(15)19)10-14(5)24-21(20)22(27)16(11-29-24)13(3)4/h6,8-10,16,22,26-27H,3,7,11H2,1-2,4-5H3/t16-,22-/m0/s1 Key: MXGMZMKTWCNKRS-AOMKIAJQSA-N; InChI=1/C25H26O5/c1-12(2)6-7-15-8-9-17(26)19-23(28)20-18(30-25(15)19)10-14(5)24-21(20)22(27)16(11-29-24)13(3)4/h6,8-10,16,22,26-27H,3,7,11H2,1-2,4-5H3/t16-,22-/m0/s1 Key: MXGMZMKTWCNKRS-AOMKIAJQBQ
- SMILES: C/C(C)=C\Cc4ccc(O)c3C(=O)c2c(cc(C)c1OC[C@H]([C@H](O)c12)C(C)=C)Oc34

Properties
Chemical formula	C_{25}H_{26}O_{5}
Molar mass	406.478 g·mol^{−1}
- Except where otherwise noted, data are given for materials in their standard state (at 25 °C [77 °F], 100 kPa). Infobox references

Shamixanthone is a chemical compound, classified as a prenylated xanthone, that has been isolated from several species of Aspergillus, including Aspergillus turkensis.
