= Deflectin =

Identifiers
CAS Number	1a: 79495-61-7; 1b: 79590-91-3; 2a: 79495-62-8; 2b: 79495-63-9
3D model (JSmol)	1a: Interactive image; 1b: Interactive image; 2a: Interactive image; 2b: Interactive image; 1c: Interactive image
ChEMBL	1a: ChEMBL1215466; 2b: ChEMBL1215536
ChemSpider	1a: 25049923; 1b: 25052503; 2a: 25052504; 2b: 25052512
PubChem CID	1a: 49864138; 1b: 102115575; 2b: 49864151
- InChI: 1a: InChI=1S/C21H24O5/c1-4-5-6-7-8-9-16(22)18-19-15-12-25-13(2)10-14(15)11-17(23)21(19,3)26-20(18)24/h10-12H,4-9H2,1-3H3/t21-/m0/s1 Key: YNVKQPJBOAUYIJ-NRFANRHFSA-N; 1b: InChI=1S/C24H30O5/c1-4-5-6-7-8-9-10-11-12-19(25)21-22-18-15-28-16(2)13-17(18)14-20(26)24(22,3)29-23(21)27/h13-15H,4-12H2,1-3H3/t24-/m0/s1 Key: FKBCHWDBWGUJBS-DEOSSOPVSA-N; 2a: InChI=1S/C24H30O5/c1-5-6-7-8-9-10-11-15(2)22(26)20-21-18-14-28-16(3)12-17(18)13-19(25)24(21,4)29-23(20)27/h12-15H,5-11H2,1-4H3/t15-,24-/m0/s1 Key: HEDXHFZUZSYLJP-OWJWWREXSA-N; 2b: InChI=1S/C26H34O5/c1-5-6-7-8-9-10-11-12-13-17(2)24(28)22-23-20-16-30-18(3)14-19(20)15-21(27)26(23,4)31-25(22)29/h14-17H,5-13H2,1-4H3/t17-,26-/m0/s1 Key: VWGYSDWIZCHBOH-QLXKLKPCSA-N; 1c: InChI=1S/C26H34O5/c1-4-5-6-7-8-9-10-11-12-13-14-21(27)23-24-20-17-30-18(2)15-19(20)16-22(28)26(24,3)31-25(23)29/h15-17H,4-14H2,1-3H3/t26-/m0/s1 Key: LDSFFACKECXQNY-SANMLTNESA-N
- SMILES: 1a: CCCCCCCC(=O)C1=C2C3=COC(=CC3=CC(=O)[C@@]2(OC1=O)C)C; 1b: CCCCCCCCCCC(=O)C1=C2C3=COC(=CC3=CC(=O)[C@@]2(OC1=O)C)C; 2a: CCCCCCCC[C@H](C)C(=O)C1=C2C3=COC(C)=CC3=CC(=O)[C@]2(C)OC1=O; 2b: CCCCCCCCCC[C@H](C)C(=O)C1=C2C3=COC(=CC3=CC(=O)[C@@]2(OC1=O)C)C; 1c: CCCCCCCCCCCCC(=O)C1=C2C3=COC(=CC3=CC(=O)[C@@]2(OC1=O)C)C
- Except where otherwise noted, data are given for materials in their standard state (at 25 °C [77 °F], 100 kPa). Infobox references

A deflectin is one of a family of antibiotic chemicals produced by Aspergillus deflectus which contain a 6H-furo[2,3-h]-2-benzopyran-6,8(6aH)-dione core.

Deflectins are yellow coloured crystalline substances when pure. They react with ammonia, by replacing an oxygen atom in the six-membered ring with an NH group. They are weak acids. On adding a strong base to an alcoholic solution of deflectin, it show a red colour for a short time. Deflectin 1a contains a 1-oxooctyl side chain. It has a melting point of 161 °C. Deflectin 1b contains a ten carbon side chain and melts at 152 °C. Deflectin 1c has a 12-atom side chain and melts at 141 °C.

Deflectin 2a melts at 122 °C. It has a 10 carbon atom side chain with a 2-methyl branch. Deflectin 2b is similar but the side chain is 2 atoms longer. It melts at 111 °C.

== Chemical structures ==
Deflectin 1a	Deflectin 1b	Deflectin 1c	Deflectin 2a	Deflectin 2b
