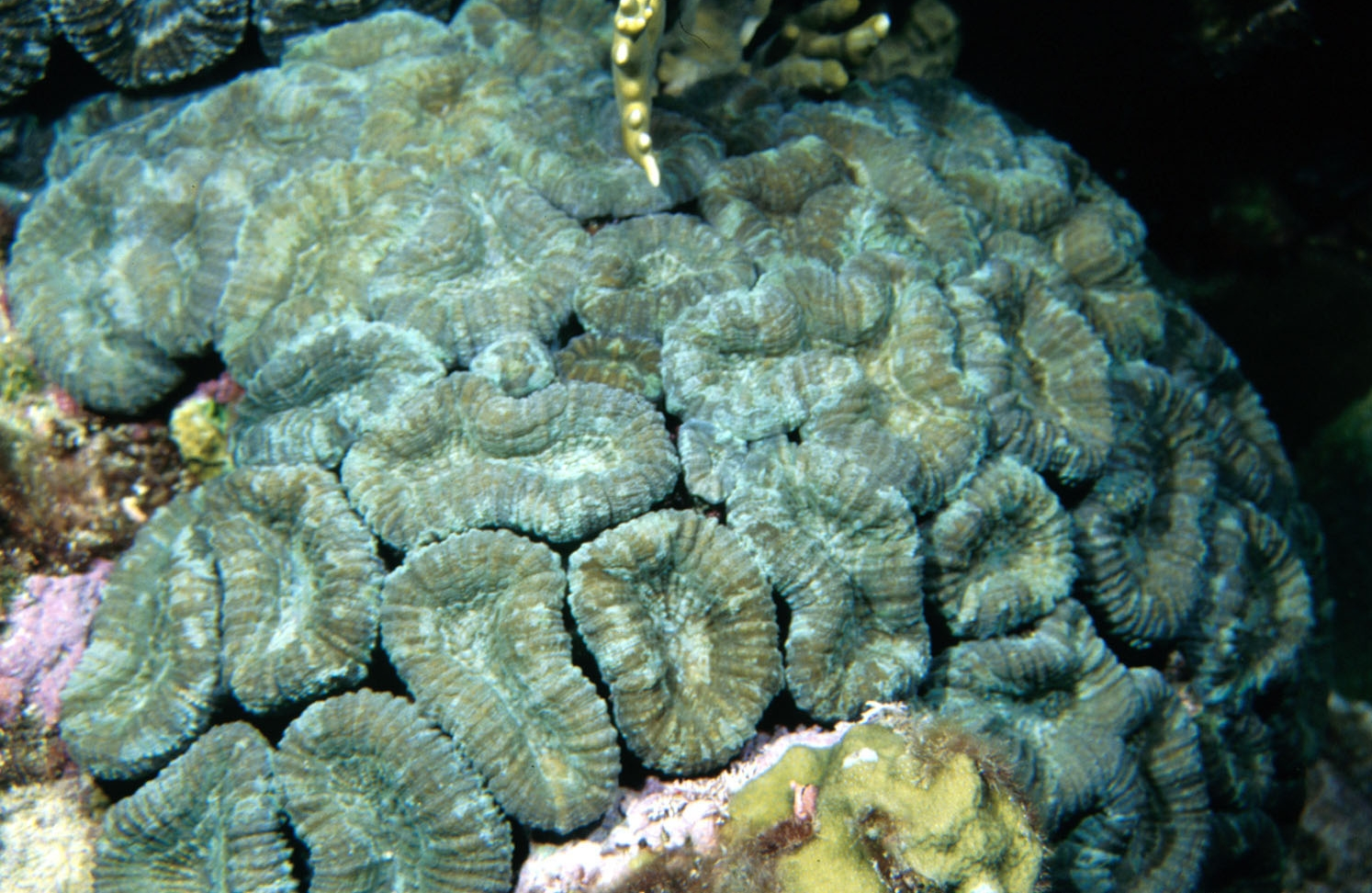
- Mussa angulosa

Scientific classification
- Kingdom: Animalia
- Phylum: Cnidaria
- Subphylum: Anthozoa
- Class: Hexacorallia
- Order: Scleractinia
- Suborder: Faviina
- Family: Mussidae; Ortmann, 1890

Synonyms
- Faviidae Gregory, 1900

= Mussidae =

Family of corals

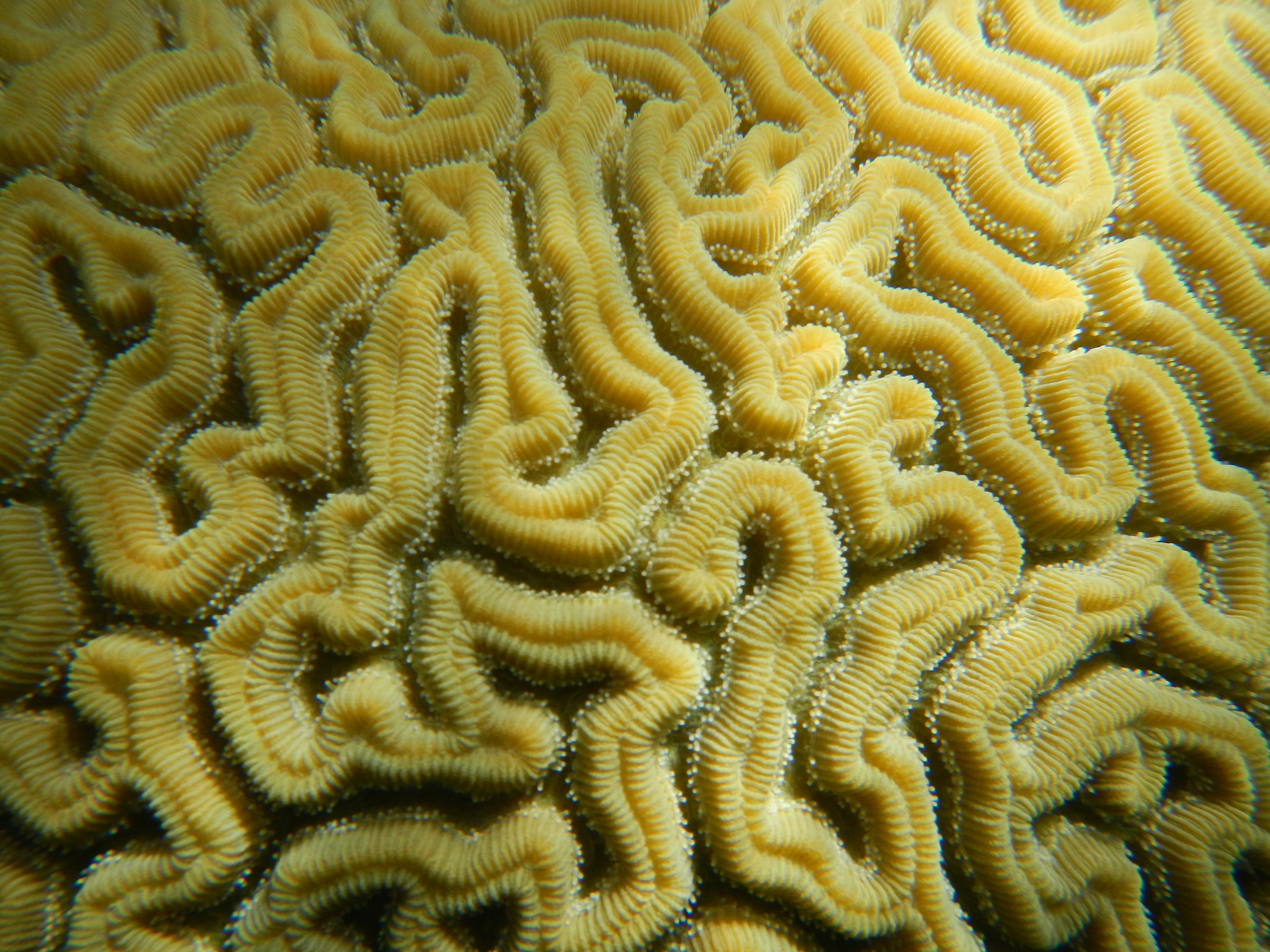
Close up of Diploria labyrinthiformis, Vieques, Puerto Rico

Mussidae is a family of stony coral in the order Scleractinia. Following a taxonomic revision in 2012, the family is now restricted to species found in the Atlantic Ocean, with Pacific species transferred to the new family Lobophylliidae. Many species are referred to as brain coral because their generally spheroid form and grooved surface resembles the convolutions of a brain.

Members of this family are found in the reef aquarium trade. Though popular in captivity, they are under threat from environmental destruction like coral bleaching. The Mussidae is one of the coral families most vulnerable to climate change.

== Taxonomy ==
The family Mussidae has long been recognised on morphological grounds but recent molecular analysis has shown that it, and several other related families, are polyphyletic, the similarities between the species having occurred through convergent evolution. Additionally, some traditional genera such as Favia and Scolymia have been found to be polyphyletic, with the Atlantic faviids and scolymids being more closely related to each other than they are to their Pacific relatives. A revised classification, proposed in 2012, places the Pacific species in a new family, Lobophylliidae and retains the taxon Mussidae for the Atlantic species. The family Faviidae is reduced to a subfamily of Mussidae, Faviinae.

=== Genera ===
The World Register of Marine Species includes the following genera in the family:

- Subfamily Faviinae Gregory, 1900
  - Colpophyllia Milne Edwards & Haime, 1848
  - Diploria Milne Edwards & Haime, 1848
  - Favia Milne Edwards, 1857
  - Manicina Ehrenberg, 1834
  - Mussismilia Ortmann, 1890
  - Pseudodiploria Fukami, Budd & Knowlton, 2012
- Subfamily Mussinae Ortmann, 1890
  - Isophyllia Milne Edwards & Haime, 1851
  - Mussa Oken, 1815
  - Mycetophyllia Milne Edwards & Haime, 1848
  - Scolymia Haime, 1852
  - Variabilifavia Barta-Calmus, 1973 †

== Description ==
Mussids are hermatypic or reef-building corals and can be either solitary or colonial. They are generally massive corals with robust, dense skeletons. The corallites (stony cups secreted by the polyps in which they sit) are large, with the septa (stony ridges) decorated by long teeth. The polyps are large and fleshy, and in certain species, the body cavity becomes inflated with water during the day, partially revealing the underlying skeleton. All species are zooxanthellate, that is, they contain symbiotic, single-celled photosynthetic dinoflagellates that live in the tissues and provide the coral with nutrients produced by photosynthesis during the day. At night, the tentacles of the polyps expand and capture zooplankton.

Budding in mussids is always intracalicular, that is to say occurring inside the oral disc of the polyp, within the whorl of tentacles. The corallites are either separate, or arranged in series, and when the coenosteum is present, it extends beyond the wall of the septa ("costate"). The septal teeth are pointed and even, either arranged transversely to the plane of the septa or in random directions. With the exception of Scolymia lacera, the teeth are the same size in each cycle of septa.

The columella is "trabecular", in that it lacks discrete individual corallites, because the budding of new polyps within the tentacles on the oral disc results in a series of mouths surrounded by a continuous whorl of tentacles; such intramural budding results in "trabecular" mouths, which are not individually encircled by tentacles. The resulting corallites that merge form the meandering valleys between costate septa typical of brain corals.

== In aquaria ==
Mussids are sometimes kept in reef aquaria but are very slow growing. They need to be kept well separate from other corals but are easy to care for. They are voracious feeders.
