= Great Barrier Reef =

Coral reef system in Queensland, Australia

UNESCO World Heritage Site
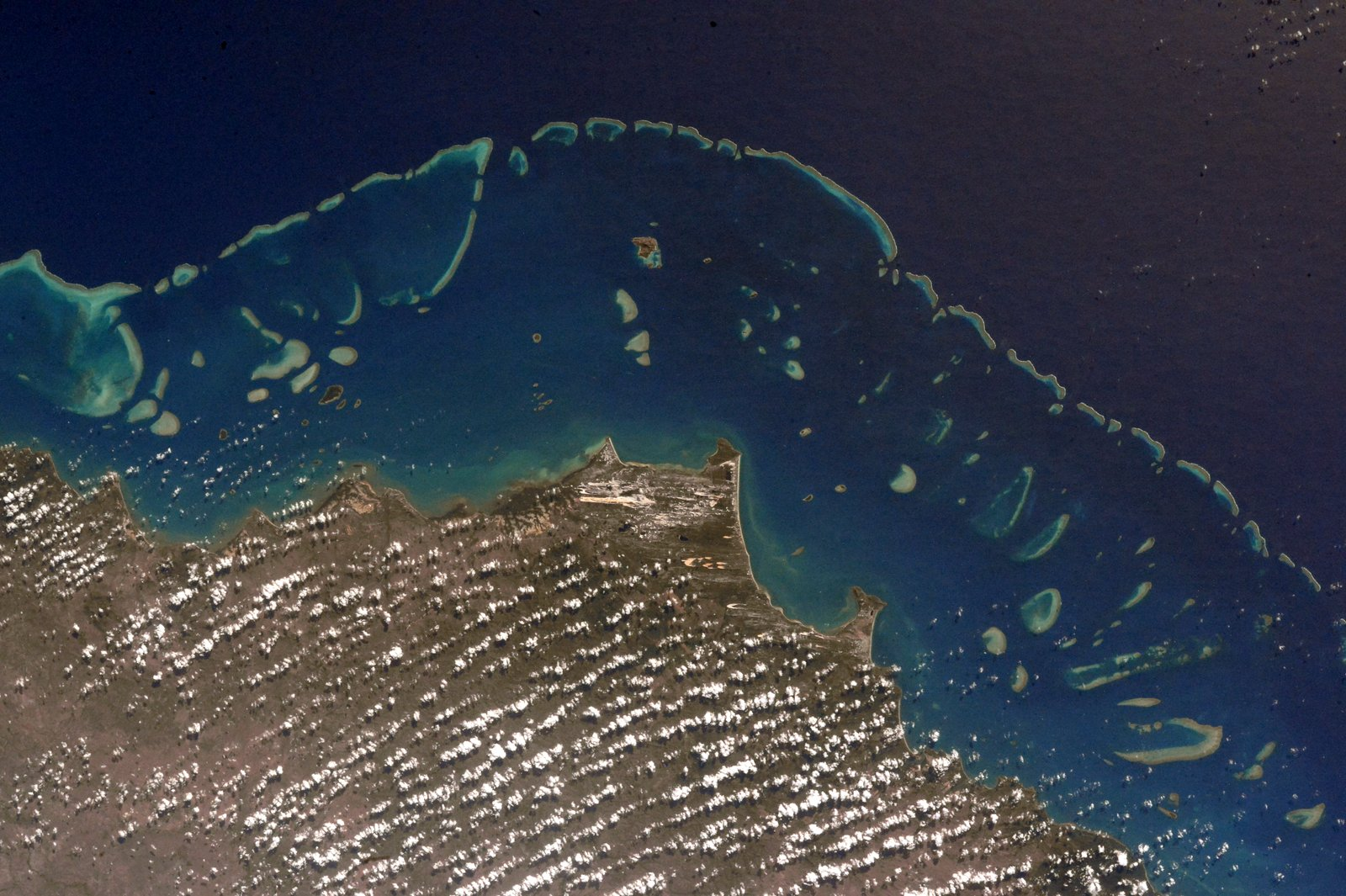
- Image of part of the Great Barrier Reef adjacent to Queensland, taken from the International Space Station
- Interactive map of Great Barrier Reef
- Location: Off the east coast of the Queensland mainland, Australia
- Criteria: Natural: vii, viii, ix, x
- Reference: 154
- Inscription: 1981 (5th Session)
- Area: 34,870,000 ha (86,200,000 acres)
- Website: www.gbrmpa.gov.au
- Coordinates: 16°24′S 145°48′E
- Locator map of the protected area

The Great Barrier Reef is the world's largest coral reef system, composed of over 2,900 individual reefs and 900 islands stretching for over 2,300 kilometres (1,400 mi) over an area of approximately 344,400 square kilometres (133,000 mi^{2}). The reef is located in the Coral Sea, off the coast of Queensland, Australia. It is separated from the coast by a channel 160 kilometres (100 mi) wide in places and over 61 metres (200 ft) deep. The Great Barrier Reef can be seen from outer space and is the world's biggest single structure made by living organisms. This reef structure is composed of and built by billions of tiny organisms, known as coral polyps. It supports a wide diversity of life and was selected as a World Heritage Site in 1981. CNN labelled it one of the Seven Natural Wonders of the World in 1997. Australian World Heritage places included it in its list in 2007. The Queensland National Trust named it a state icon of Queensland in 2006.

A large part of the reef is protected by the Great Barrier Reef Marine Park, which helps to limit the impact of human use, such as fishing and tourism. Other environmental pressures on the reef and its ecosystem include runoff of humanmade pollutants, climate change accompanied by mass coral bleaching, dumping of dredging sludge and cyclic population outbreaks of the crown-of-thorns starfish. According to a study published in October 2012 by the Proceedings of the National Academy of Sciences, the reef has lost more than half its coral cover since 1985, a finding reaffirmed by a 2020 study which found over half of the reef's coral cover to have been lost between 1995 and 2017, with the effects of a widespread 2020 bleaching event not yet quantified.

The Great Barrier Reef has long been known to and used by the Aboriginal Australian and Torres Strait Islander peoples, and is an important part of local groups' cultures and spirituality. The reef is a very popular destination for tourists, especially in the Whitsunday Islands and Cairns regions. Tourism is an important economic activity for the region, generating over AUD$3 billion per year. In November 2014, Google launched Google Underwater Street View in 3D of the Great Barrier Reef.

A March 2016 report stated that coral bleaching was more widespread than previously thought, seriously affecting the northern parts of the reef as a result of warming ocean temperatures. In October 2016, Outside published an obituary for the reef; the article was criticised for being premature and hindering efforts to bolster the resilience of the reef. In March 2017, the journal Nature published a paper showing that huge sections of an 800-kilometre (500 mi) stretch in the northern part of the reef had died in the course of 2016 of high water temperatures, an event that the authors put down to the effects of global climate change. The percentage of baby corals being born on the Great Barrier Reef dropped drastically in 2018 and scientists are describing it as the early stage of a "huge natural selection event unfolding". Many of the mature breeding adults died in the bleaching events of 2016–17, leading to low coral birth rates. The types of corals that reproduced also changed, leading to a "long-term reorganisation of the reef ecosystem if the trend continues."

The Great Barrier Reef Marine Park Act 1975 (section 54) stipulates an Outlook Report on the Reef's health, pressures, and future every five years. The last report was published in 2019. In March 2022, another mass bleaching event has been confirmed, which raised further concerns about the future of this reef system, especially when considering the possible effects of El Niño weather phenomenon.

The Australian Institute of Marine Science conducts annual surveys of the Great Barrier Reef's status, and the 2022 report showed the greatest recovery in 36 years. It is mainly due to the regrowth of two-thirds of the reef by the fast-growing Acropora coral, which is the dominant coral there.

== "Discovery" and naming ==
The Great Barrier Reef has long been known to and used by the Aboriginal Australian and Torres Strait Islander peoples, and is an important part of local groups' cultures and spirituality.

The first European to discover the Great Barrier Reef was James Cook in 1770, who sailed and mapped the east coast of Australia. On 11 June 1770, Cook's ship, HMS Endeavour, ran aground on a shoal south of the present-day location of Cooktown, requiring seven weeks to repair.

It was Matthew Flinders who named the Great Barrier Reef, after his more detailed mapping of it in 1802. Flinders used various terms to describe the reefs comprising what we now call the Great Barrier Reef including "great reef", for one such reef, "barrier reef", for any reef preventing a sailing vessel in, or waves from, the open sea, from reaching the coast, and "Barrier Reefs", for the collection of such reefs.

== Geology and geography ==
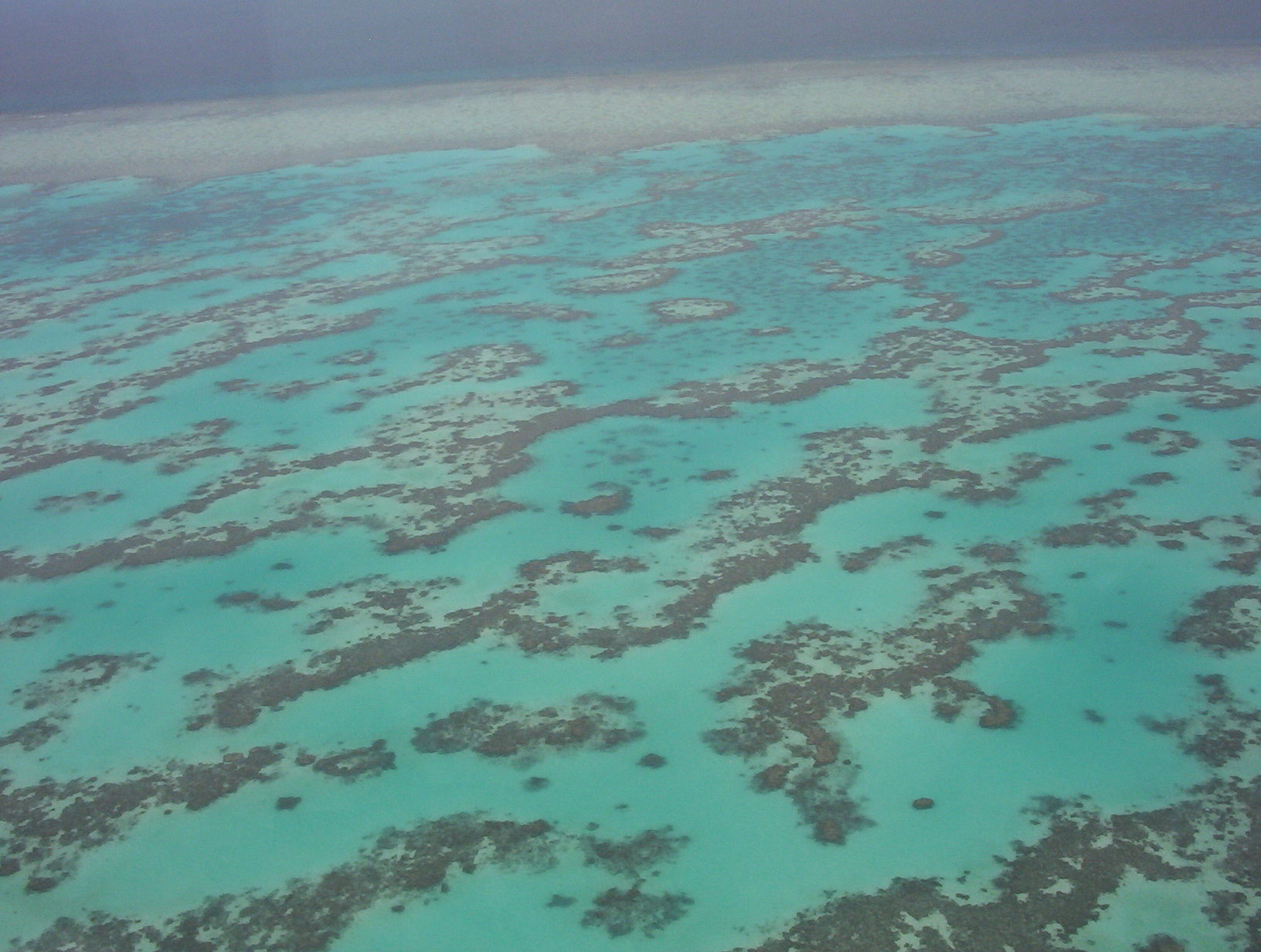
Aerial photography

The Great Barrier Reef is a distinct feature of the East Australian Cordillera division. It reaches from Torres Strait (between Bramble Cay, its northernmost island, and the south coast of Papua New Guinea) in the north to the unnamed passage between Lady Elliot Island (its southernmost island) and Fraser Island in the south. Lady Elliot Island is located 1,915 km (1,190 mi) southeast of Bramble Cay as the crow flies. It includes the smaller Murray Islands.

The plate tectonic theory indicates Australia has moved northwards at a rate of 7 cm (2.8 in) per year, starting during the Cenozoic. Eastern Australia experienced a period of tectonic uplift, which moved the drainage divide in Queensland 400 km (250 mi) inland. Also during this time, Queensland experienced volcanic eruptions leading to central and shield volcanoes and basalt flows. Some of these became volcanic islands. After the Coral Sea Basin formed, coral reefs began to grow in the Basin, but until about 25 million years ago, northern Queensland was still in temperate waters south of the tropics – too cool to support coral growth. The Great Barrier Reef's development history is complex; after Queensland drifted into tropical waters, it was largely influenced by reef growth and decline as sea level changed.

Reefs can increase in diameter by 1 to 3 centimetres (0.39 to 1.18 in) per year, and grow vertically anywhere from 1 to 25 cm (0.39 to 9.84 in) per year; however, they grow only above a depth of 150 metres (490 ft) due to their need for sunlight, and cannot grow above sea level. When Queensland edged into tropical waters 24 million years ago, some coral grew, but a sedimentation regime quickly developed with erosion of the Great Dividing Range; creating river deltas, oozes and turbidites, unsuitable conditions for coral growth. 10 million years ago, the sea level significantly lowered, which further enabled sedimentation. The reef's substrate may have needed to build up from the sediment until its edge was too far away for suspended sediments to inhibit coral growth. In addition, approximately 400,000 years ago there was a particularly warm Interglacial period with higher sea levels and a 4 °C (7 °F) water temperature change.

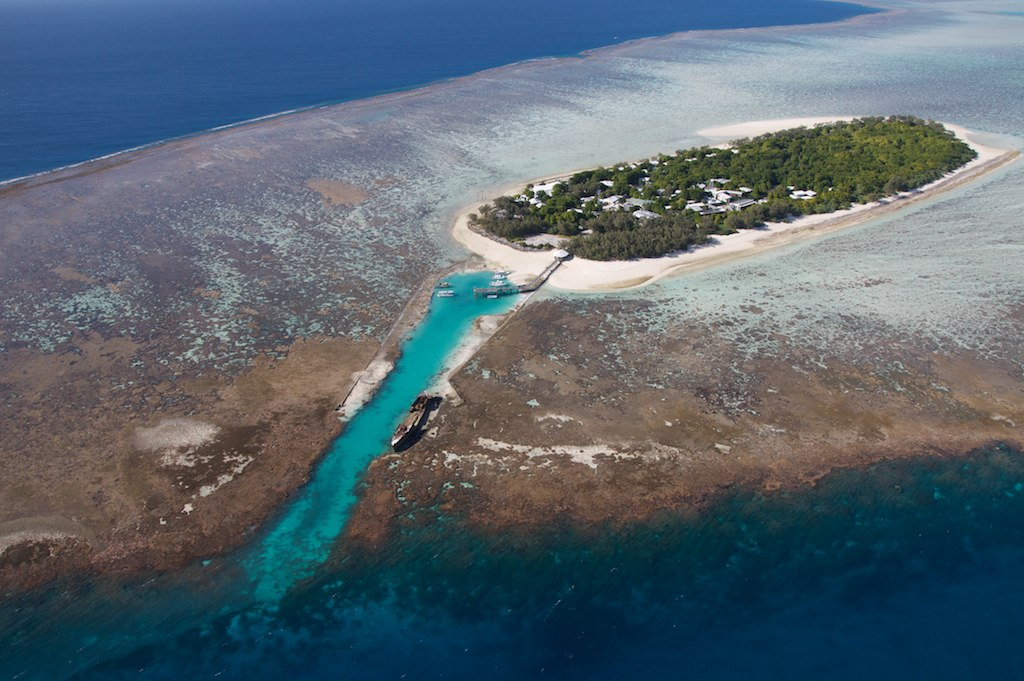
Heron Island, a coral cay in the southern Great Barrier Reef

The land that formed the substrate of the current Great Barrier Reef was a coastal plain formed from the eroded sediments of the Great Dividing Range with some larger hills (most of which were themselves remnants of older reefs or, in rare cases, volcanoes). The Reef Research Centre, a Cooperative Research Centre, has found coral 'skeleton' deposits that date back half a million years. The Great Barrier Reef Marine Park Authority (GBRMPA) considers the earliest evidence of complete reef structures to have been 600,000 years ago. According to the GBRMPA, the current, living reef structure is believed to have begun growing on the older platform about 9,000 years ago. The Australian Institute of Marine Science agrees, placing the beginning of the growth of the current reef at the time of the Last Glacial Maximum. At around that time, sea level was 120 metres (390 ft) lower than it is today.

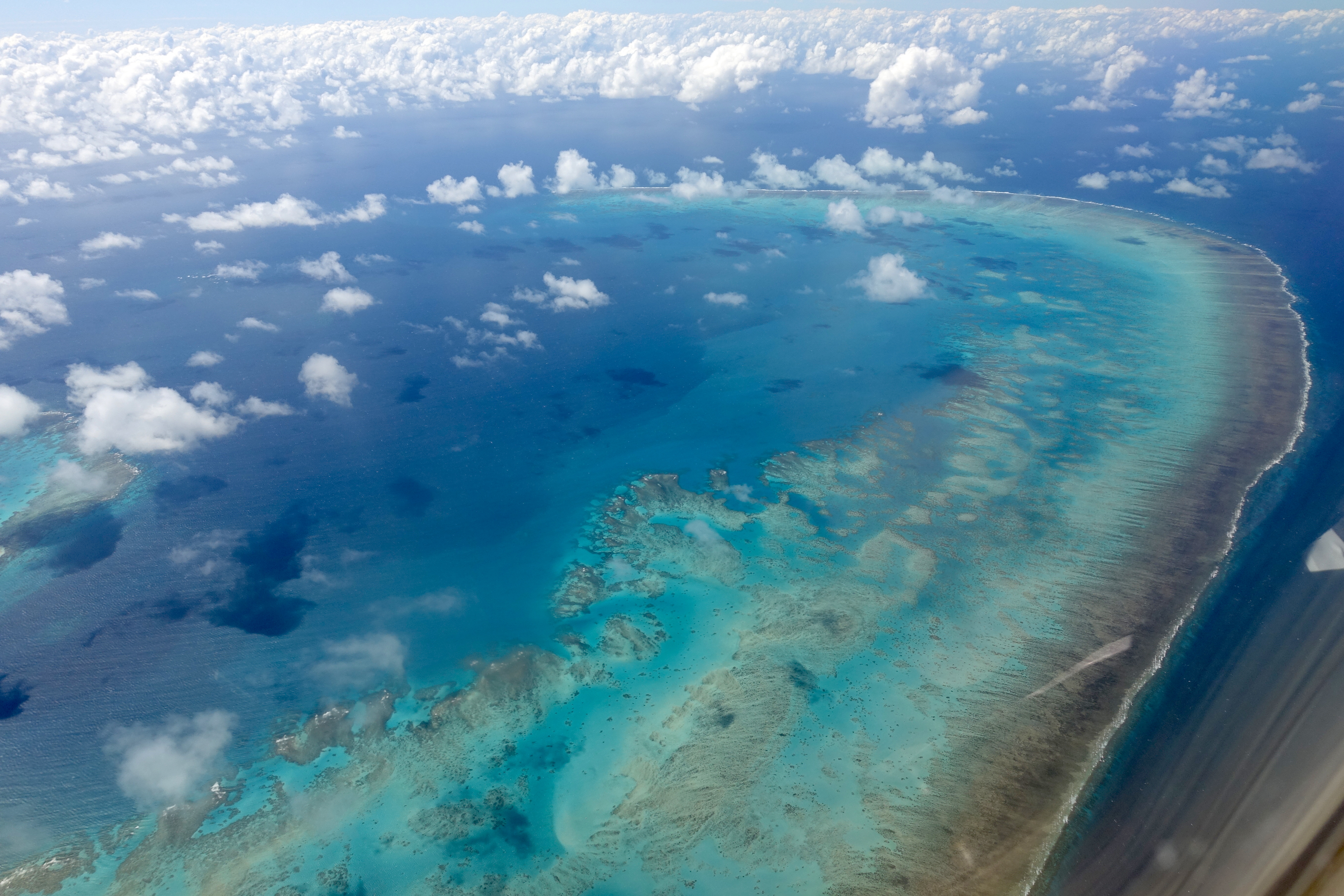
Aerial view of Arlington Reef

From 20,000 years ago until 6,000 years ago, sea level rose steadily around the world. As it rose, the corals could then grow higher on the newly submerged maritime margins of the hills of the coastal plain. By around 13,000 years ago the sea level was only 60 metres (200 ft) lower than the present day, and corals began to surround the hills of the coastal plain, which were, by then, continental islands. As the sea level rose further still, most of the continental islands were submerged. The corals could then overgrow the submerged hills, to form the present cays and reefs. Sea level here has not risen significantly in the last 6,000 years. The CRC Reef Research Centre estimates the age of the present, living reef structure at 6,000 to 8,000 years old. The shallow water reefs that can be seen in air-photographs and satellite images cover an area of 20,679 km^{2}, most (about 80%) of which has grown on top of limestone platforms that are relics of past (Pleistocene) phases of reef growth.

The remains of an ancient barrier reef similar to the Great Barrier Reef can be found in The Kimberley, Western Australia.

The Great Barrier Reef World Heritage Area has been divided into 70 bioregions, of which 30 are reef bioregions. In the northern part of the Great Barrier Reef, ribbon reefs and deltaic reefs have formed; these structures are not found in the rest of the reef system. A previously undiscovered reef, 500 metres tall and 1.5 km wide at the base, was found in the northern area in 2020. There are no atolls in the system, and reefs attached to the mainland are rare.

Fringing reefs are distributed widely, but are most common towards the southern part of the Great Barrier Reef, attached to high islands, for example, the Whitsunday Islands. Lagoonal reefs are found in the southern Great Barrier Reef, and further north, off the coast of Princess Charlotte Bay. Crescentic reefs are the most common shape of reef in the middle of the system, for example the reefs surrounding Lizard Island. Crescentic reefs are also found in the far north of the Great Barrier Reef Marine Park, and in the Swain Reefs (20–22 degrees south). Planar reefs are found in the northern and southern parts, near Cape York Peninsula, Princess Charlotte Bay, and Cairns. Most of the islands on the reef are found on planar reefs.

Wonky holes can have localised impact on the reef, providing upwellings of fresh water, sometimes rich in nutrients contributing to eutrophication.

Navigation through and around the reefs is a major challenge. More than 20 ships were recorded lost in the region between 1791 and 1850, Surveys between 1815 and 1860 by Phillip Parker King in the Mermaid, Francis Price Blackwood in HMS Fly, Owen Stanley in the Rattlesnake, and Henry Mangles Denham in the Herald led to considerable navigational improvements, as they outlined the contrasting advantages and perils of the Inner Route (between Australia's east coast and the western edge of the reefs) and the Outer Route, in the open sea.

== Ecology ==
A variety of colourful corals on Flynn Reef near Cairns

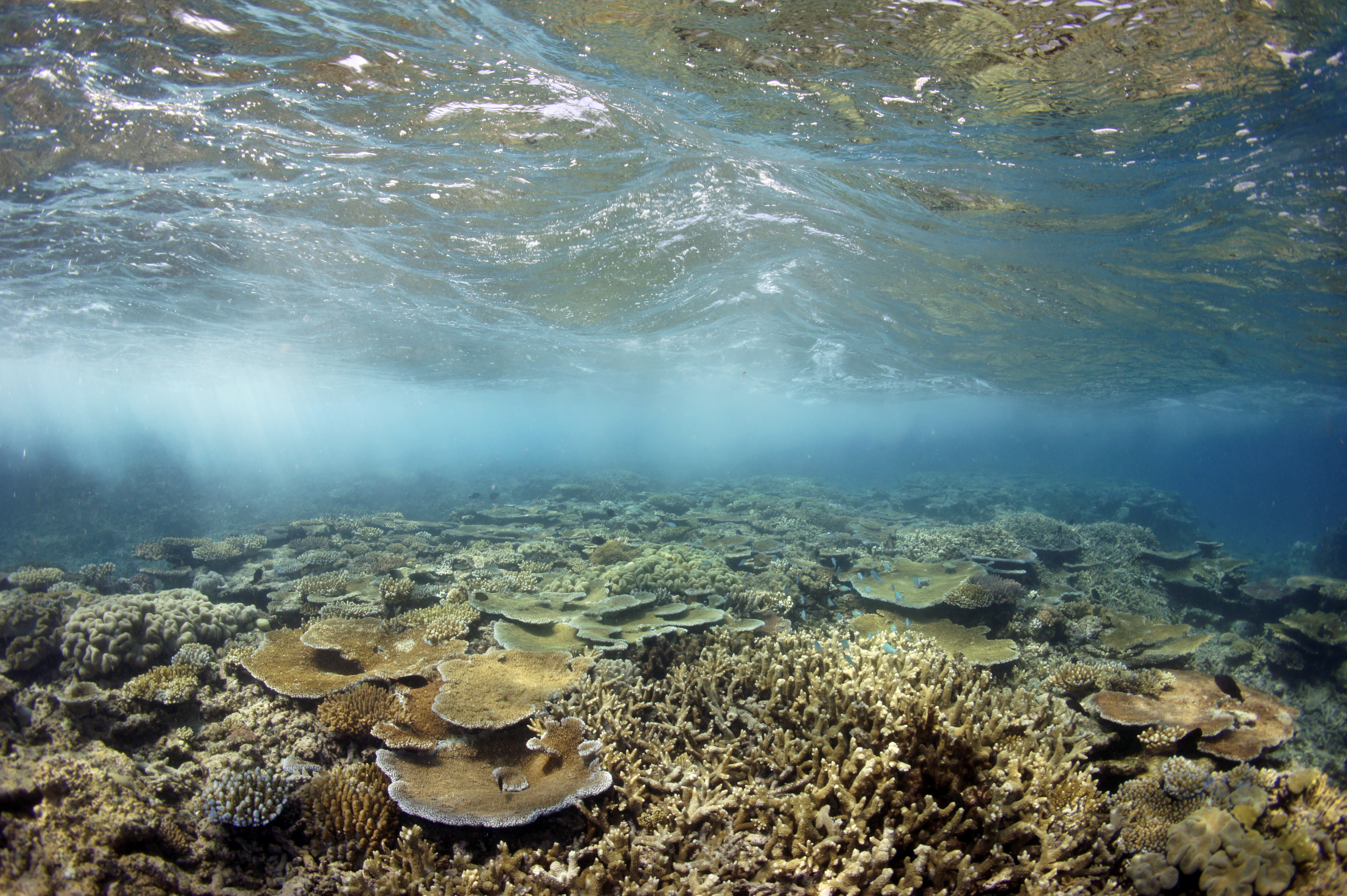
Moore Reef

The Great Barrier Reef supports an extraordinary diversity of life, including many vulnerable or endangered species, some of which may be endemic to the reef system.

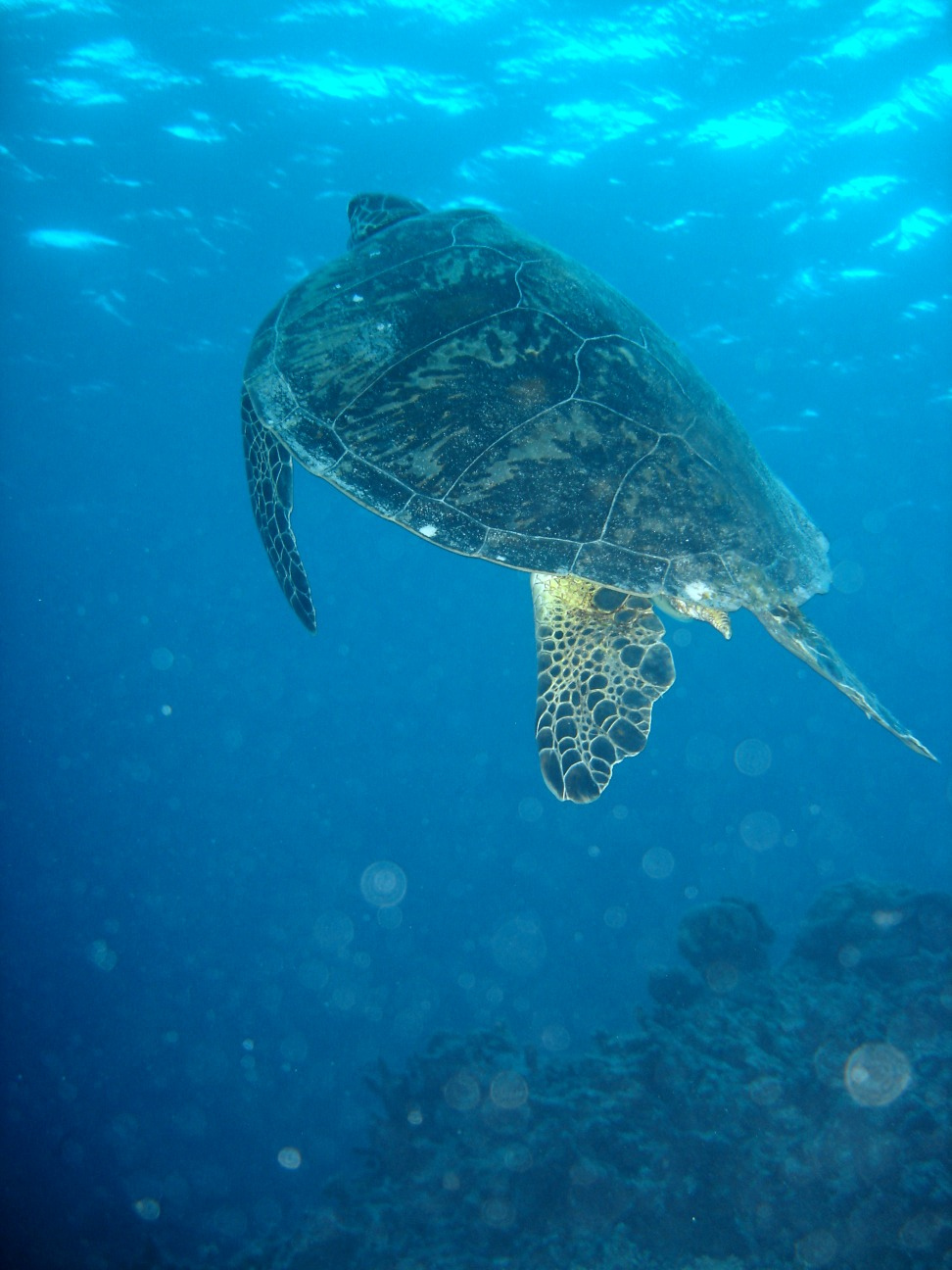
A green sea turtle on the Great Barrier Reef

Thirty species of cetaceans have been recorded in the Great Barrier Reef, including the dwarf minke whale, Indo-Pacific humpback dolphin, and the humpback whale. Large populations of dugongs live there. More than 1,500 fish species live on the reef, including the clownfish, red bass, red-throat emperor, and several species of snapper and coral trout. Forty-nine species mass spawn, while eighty-four other species spawn elsewhere in their range. Seventeen species of sea snake live on the Great Barrier Reef in warm waters up to 50 metres (160 ft) deep and are more common in the southern than in the northern section. None found in the Great Barrier Reef World Heritage Area are endemic, nor are any endangered.

Six species of sea turtles come to the reef to breed: the green sea turtle, leatherback sea turtle, hawksbill turtle, loggerhead sea turtle, flatback turtle, and the olive ridley. The green sea turtles on the Great Barrier Reef have two genetically distinct populations, one in the northern part of the reef and the other in the southern part. Fifteen species of seagrass in beds attract the dugongs and turtles, and provide fish habitat. The most common genera of seagrasses are Halophila and Halodule.

Saltwater crocodiles live in mangrove and salt marshes on the coast near the reef. Nesting has not been reported, and the salt water crocodile population in the GBRWHA is wide-ranging but low density. Around 125 species of shark, stingray, skates or chimaera live on the reef. Close to 5,000 species of mollusc have been recorded on the reef, including the giant clam and various nudibranchs and cone snails. Forty-nine species of pipefish and nine species of seahorse have been recorded. At least seven species of frog inhabit the islands.

215 species of birds (including 22 species of seabirds and 32 species of shorebirds) visit the reef or nest or roost on the islands, including the white-bellied sea eagle and roseate tern. Most nesting sites are on islands in the northern and southern regions of the Great Barrier Reef, with 1.4 to 1.7 million birds using the sites to breed. The islands of the Great Barrier Reef also support 2,195 known plant species; three of these are endemic. The northern islands have 300–350 plant species which tend to be woody, whereas the southern islands have 200 which tend to be herbaceous; the Whitsunday region is the most diverse, supporting 1,141 species. The plants are propagated by birds.

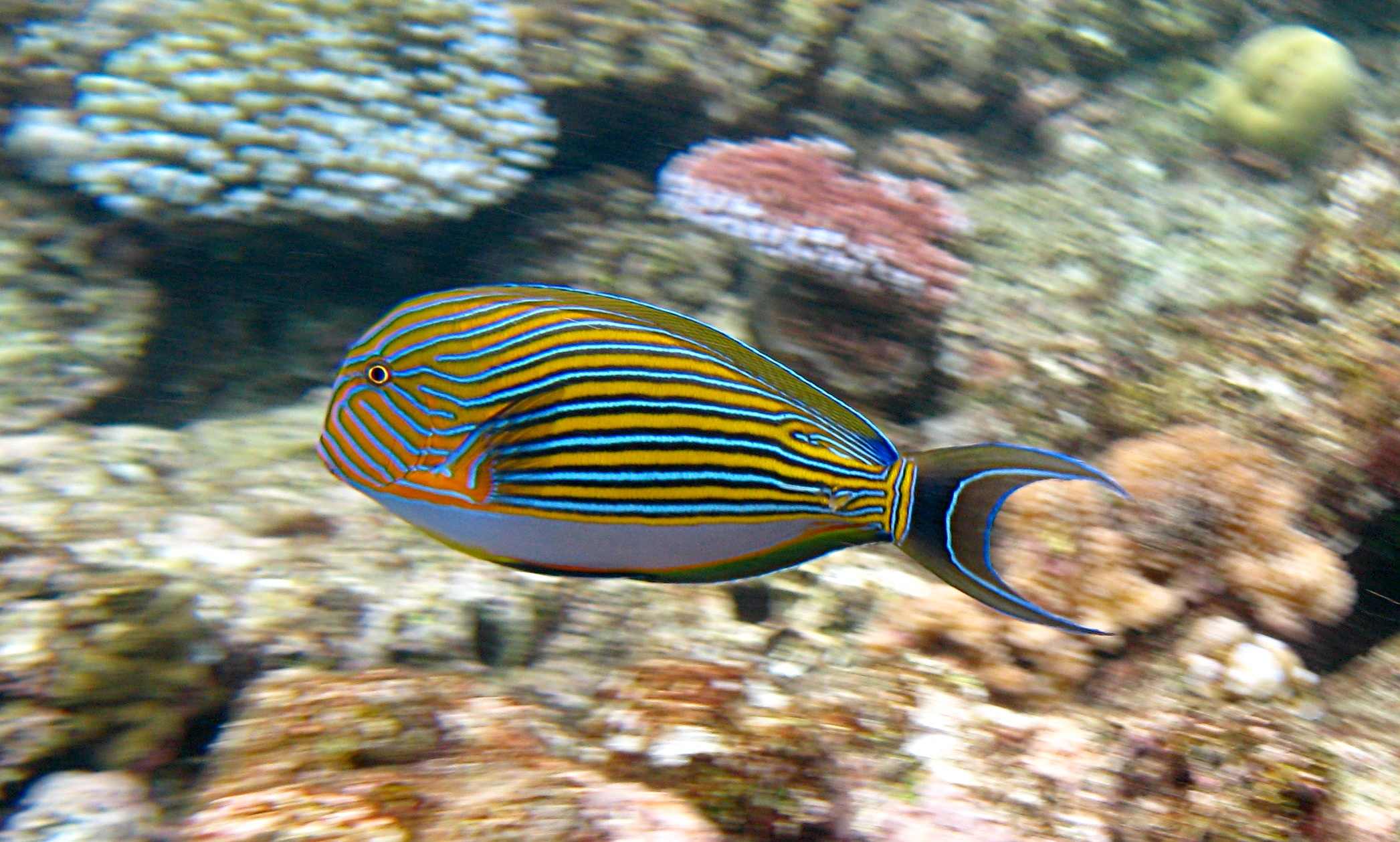
A striped surgeonfish amongst the coral on Flynn Reef

There are at least 330 species of ascidians on the reef system with the diameter of 1–10 cm (0.4–4 in). Between 300 and 500 species of bryozoans live on the reef. Four hundred coral species, both hard corals and soft corals inhabit the reef. The majority of these spawn gametes, breeding in mass spawning events that are triggered by the rising sea temperatures of spring and summer, the lunar cycle, and the diurnal cycle. Reefs in the inner Great Barrier Reef spawn during the week after the full moon in October, while the outer reefs spawn in November and December. Its common soft corals belong to 36 genera. Five hundred species of marine algae or seaweed live on the reef, including thirteen species of genus Halimeda, which deposit calcareous mounds up to 100 metres (110 yd) wide, creating mini-ecosystems on their surface which have been compared to rainforest cover.

== Environmental threats ==
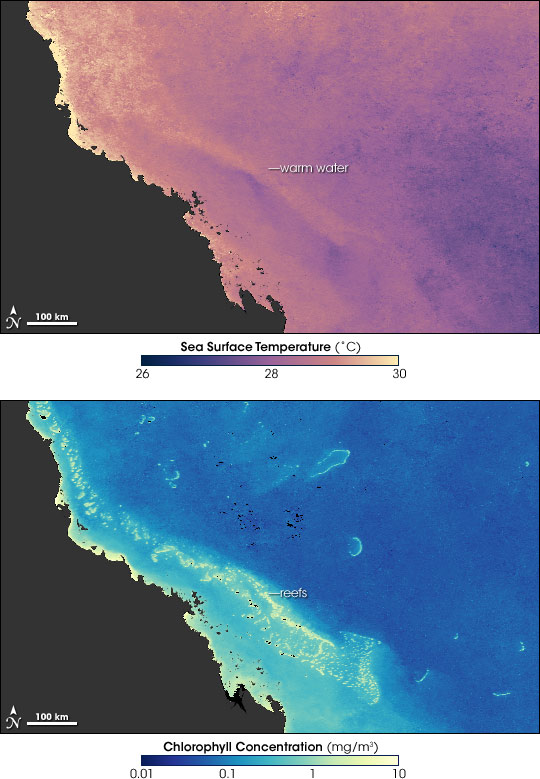
Sea temperature and bleaching of the Great Barrier Reef

Climate change, pollution, crown-of-thorns starfish and fishing are the primary threats to the health of this reef system. Other threats include shipping accidents, oil spills, and tropical cyclones. Skeletal Eroding Band, a disease of bony corals caused by the protozoan Halofolliculina corallasia, affects 31 coral species. According to a 2012 study by the National Academy of Sciences, since 1985, the Great Barrier Reef has lost more than half of its corals with two-thirds of the loss occurring from 1998 due to the factors listed before. In 2022, the northern and central parts of the reef had the highest amount of coral cover since monitoring began, but the cover in the southern part had decreased and bleaching events occurred more frequently.

=== Climate change ===
The Great Barrier Reef Marine Park Authority considers the greatest threat to the Great Barrier Reef to be climate change, causing ocean warming which increases coral bleaching. Mass coral bleaching events due to marine heatwaves occurred in the summers of 1998, 2002, 2006, 2016, 2017 and 2020, and coral bleaching is expected to become an annual occurrence. In 2020, a study found that the Great Barrier Reef has lost more than half of its corals since 1995 due to warmer seas driven by climate change. As global warming continues, corals will not be able to keep up with increasing ocean temperatures. Coral bleaching events lead to increased disease susceptibility, which causes detrimental ecological effects for reef communities.

In July 2017 UNESCO published in a draft decision, expressing serious concern about the impact of coral bleaching on the Great Barrier Reef. The draft decision also warned Australia that it will not meet the targets of the Reef 2050 report without considerable work to improve water quality.

Climate change has implications for other forms of reef life – some fish's preferred temperature range leads them to seek new habitat, thus increasing chick mortality in predatory seabirds. Climate change will also affect the sea turtle's population and available habitat.

Bleaching events in benthic coral communities (deeper than 20 metres or 66 feet) in the Great Barrier reef are not as well documented as those at shallower depths, but recent research has shown that benthic communities are just as negatively impacted in the face of rising ocean temperatures. Five Great Barrier Reef species of large benthic corals were found bleached under elevated temperatures, affirming that benthic corals are vulnerable to thermal stress.

=== Ocean Acidification ===
A threat for the Great Barrier Reef is the rising levels of ocean acidification. Ocean acidification occurs when excess atmospheric carbon dioxide gets absorbed into the ocean. This causes a decrease in the pH and this alters the chemistry of the ocean's water. This reduces the amount of aragonite, a key mineral for coral to grow, in the water. The Great Barrier Reef is predicted to lose aragonite at a rate of about 0.1 per decade this century. The acidic water breaks down the materials that coral and shell building creatures need to grow.

=== Pollution ===
Another key threat faced by the Great Barrier Reef is pollution and declining water quality. The rivers of north-eastern Australia pollute the Reef during tropical flood events. Over 90% of this pollution comes from farm runoff. 80% of the land adjacent to the Great Barrier Reef is used for farming including intensive cropping of sugar cane, and major beef cattle grazing. Farming practices damage the reef due to overgrazing, increased run-off of agricultural sediments, nutrients and chemicals including fertilisers, herbicides and pesticides representing a major health risk for the coral and biodiversity of the reefs.

According to a 2016 report, while higher regulation contributes to less overall pollution from "other land uses, such as industrial, mining, port development, dredging and urban development", these can still be locally significant. Sediments containing high levels of copper and other heavy metals sourced from the Ok Tedi Mine in Papua New Guinea are a potential pollution risk for the far northern Great Barrier Reef and Torres Strait regions. Some 67% of corals died in the reef's worst-hit northern section, the ARC Centre of Excellence for Coral Reef Studies report said.

==== Loss of coastal wetland ====
The runoff problem is exacerbated by the loss of coastal wetlands which act as a natural filter for toxins and help deposit sediment. It is thought that the poor water quality is due to increased light and oxygen competition from algae.

==== Eutrophication ====
Farming fertiliser runoff release nitrogen, phosphorus, and potassium into the oceanic ecosystem, and these limiting nutrients cause massive algal growth which eventually leads to a reduction in oxygen available for other creatures in a process called eutrophication. This decreases the biodiversity in the affected areas, altering the species composition. A study by Katharina Fabricius and Glen Death of Australian Institute of Marine Science found that hard corals numbers were almost double on reefs that were far from agricultural areas.

Fertilizers also increase the amount of phytoplankton available for the crown-of-thorns starfish larvae to consume. A study showed that a doubling of the chlorophyll in the water leads to a tenfold increase in the crown-of-thorns starfish larvae's survival rate.

==== Sediment runoff ====
Sediment runoff from farming carries chemicals into the reef environment also reduces the amount of light available to the corals decreasing their ability to extract energy from their environment.

==== Pesticides ====
Pesticides used in farming are made up of heavy metals such as lead, mercury, arsenic and other toxins are released into the wider environment due to erosion of farm soil, which has a detrimental effect on the coral.

==== Pollution from mining ====
Mining company Queensland Nickel discharged nitrate-laden water into the Great Barrier Reef in 2009 and 2011 – on the later occasion releasing 516 tonnes (508 long tons; 569 short tons) of waste water. The Great Barrier Reef Marine Park Authority (GBRMPA) stated "We have strongly encouraged the company to investigate options that do not entail releasing the material to the environment and to develop a management plan to eliminate this potential hazard; however, GBRMPA does not have legislative control over how the Yabulu tailings dam is managed".

=== Crown of thorns ===
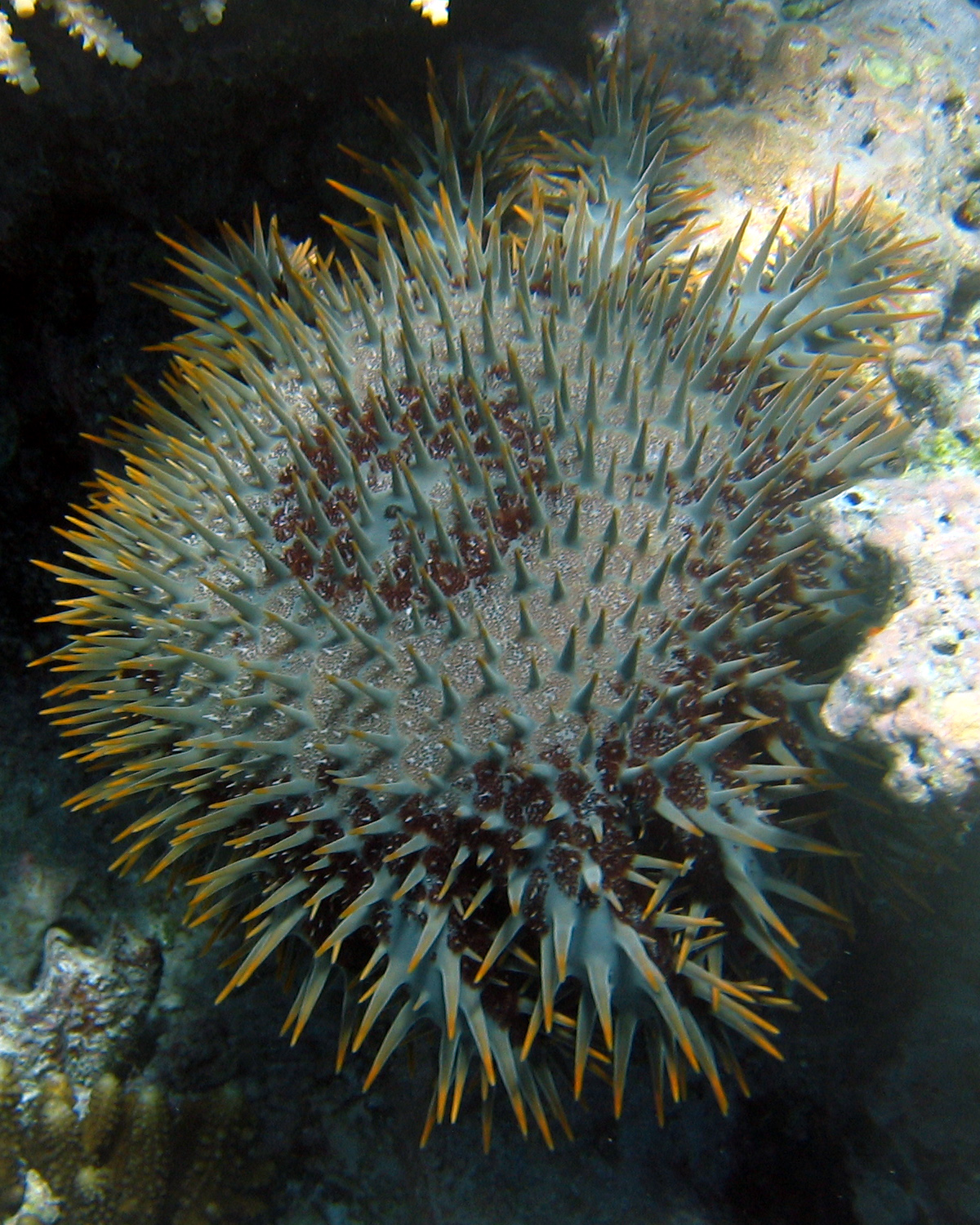
Crown-of-thorns starfish

The crown-of-thorns starfish preys on coral polyps. Large outbreaks of these starfish can devastate reefs. In 2000, an outbreak contributed to a loss of 66% of live coral cover on sampled reefs in a study by the Reef Research Centre (RRC). Outbreaks are believed to occur in natural cycles, worsened by poor water quality and overfishing of the starfish's predators.

=== Overfishing ===
The unsustainable overfishing of keystone species, such as the giant Triton, can disrupt food chains vital to reef life. Fishing also impacts the reef through increased water pollution from boats, by-catch of unwanted species (such as dolphins and turtles) and habitat destruction from trawling, anchors and nets. As of the middle of 2004, approximately one-third of the Great Barrier Reef Marine Park is protected from species removal of any kind, including fishing, without written permission.

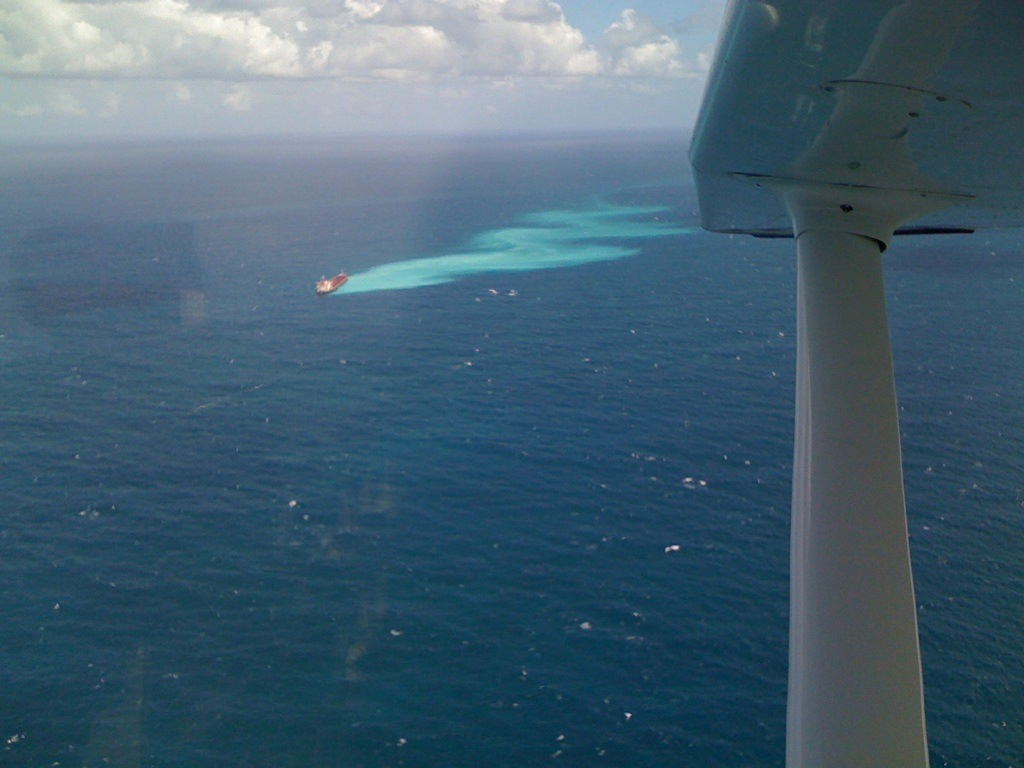
The Shen Neng 1 aground on the Great Barrier Reef, 5 April 2010

=== Shipping ===
Shipping accidents are a pressing concern, as several commercial shipping routes pass through the Great Barrier Reef. Although the route through the Great Barrier Reef is not easy, reef pilots consider it safer than outside the reef in the event of mechanical failure, since a ship can sit safely while being repaired. There have been over 1,600 known shipwrecks in the Great Barrier Reef region. On 3 April 2010, the bulk coal carrier Shen Neng 1 ran aground on Douglas Shoals, spilling up to four tonnes of oil into the water and causing extensive damage to the reef.

=== Shark culling ===
The government of Queensland has a "shark control" program (shark culling) that deliberately kills sharks throughout Queensland, including in the Great Barrier Reef. Environmentalists and scientists say that this program harms the marine ecosystem; they also say it is "outdated, cruel and ineffective". The Queensland "shark control" program uses shark nets and drum lines with baited hooks to kill sharks in the Great Barrier Reef – there are 173 lethal drum lines in the Great Barrier Reef. In Queensland, sharks found alive on the baited hooks are shot. Queensland's "shark control" program killed about 50,000 sharks from 1962 to 2018. Also, Queensland's "shark control" program has also killed many other animals (such as dolphins and turtles) – the program killed 84,000 marine animals from 1962 to 2015, including in the Great Barrier Reef. In 2018, Humane Society International filed a lawsuit against the government of Queensland to stop shark culling in the Great Barrier Reef.

== Protection and preservation: Reef 2050 plan ==
In March 2015, the Australian and Queensland's governments formed a plan for the protection and preservation of the reef's universal heritage until 2050. This 35-year plan, titled "Reef 2050 Plan" is a document proposing possible measures for the long-term management of the pollution, climate change and other issues that threaten the life-span and value of this global heritage. The plan contains all the elements for measurement and improvements, including long-term sustainability plan, water quality improvement plan and the investment plan for the protection and preservation of The Reef until 2050.

However, whereas the 2050 plan aims to incorporate protective measures such as improving water quality, reef restoration and killing predatory starfish, it does not incorporate additional measures to address what may be the root cause of the problem – climate change, which is caused by greenhouse gas emissions. As such, experts doubted whether it would be enough to save the fragile environment. Another issue is that the time left to the 1.5 °C warming threshold (the temperature limit that coral reefs can still cope with) is very limited.

As part of the Reef 2050 plan, an AUD$443 million grant was given to the Great Barrier Reef Foundation in 2018. The announcement of the grant was subject to backlash as the grant had avoided proper tender and transparency processes.

=== Conservation Policy: Reef 2050 Water Quality Improvement Plan ===
The Great Barrier Reef contributes to the overall wellbeing of the marine biome. Numerous species of aquatic plants, fish and megafauna use the reef for feeding, shelter and mating. Threats such as ocean acidification, pollution runoff and outbreaks of destructive species like the crown-of-thorns starfish have brought about the decline of this ecosystem. These threats to the reef are not only a danger to the organisms inhabiting it, but also the economy of this region, a large part of which relies on revenue from ecotourism of the Great Barrier Reef.

The Australian government has had the goal of protecting this World Heritage Site since 1972 when they created The Australian Institute of Marine Science. The Australian and Queensland governments have contributed about $142.5 million to their National Environmental Science Program which is how they've collected much of their data regarding threats to the Great Barrier Reef. In addition, the Reef 2050 Water Quality Improvement Plan was announced in 2018 in order to help transition local communities, agricultural organizations and industries to more sustainable practices. This plan will join the Queensland government and the Great Barrier Reef Marine Park Authority to manage the amounts of runoff that reach the Great Barrier Reef as well as mitigating crown-of-thorns starfish population flare-ups.

== Human use ==
The Great Barrier Reef has long been known to and used by the Aboriginal Australian and Torres Strait Islander peoples. Aboriginal Australians have been living in the area for at least 40,000 years, and Torres Strait Islanders since about 10,000 years ago. For these 70 or so clan groups, the reef is also an important cultural feature.

In 1768, Louis de Bougainville encountered the reef, but did not explore it. On 11 June 1770, HM Bark Endeavour, captained by explorer James Cook, ran aground on the Great Barrier Reef, sustaining considerable damage. Lightening the ship and re-floating it during an incoming tide eventually saved it. One of the most famous wrecks was HMS Pandora, which sank on 29 August 1791, killing 35 men. The Queensland Museum has led archaeological digs to wreck of Pandora since 1983. Because the reef had no atolls, it was largely unstudied in the 19th century. During this time, some of the reef's islands were mined for deposits of guano, and lighthouses were built as beacons throughout the system. as in Raine Island, the earliest example. In 1922, the Great Barrier Reef Committee began carrying out much of the early research on the reef.

=== Management ===
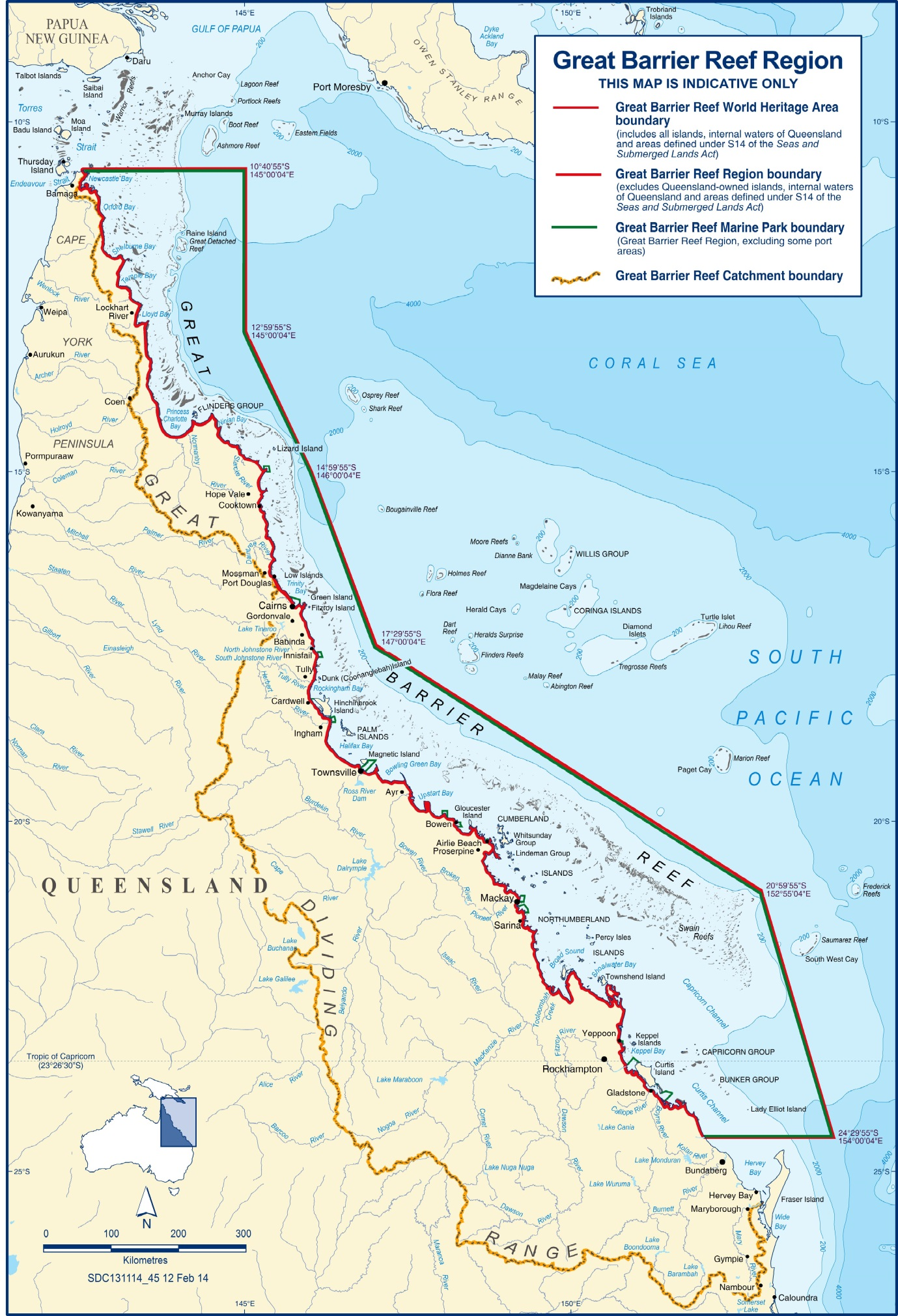
Map of The Great Barrier Reef Region, World Heritage Area and Marine Park, 2014

Royal Commissions disallowed oil drilling in the Great Barrier Reef, in 1975 the Government of Australia created the Great Barrier Reef Marine Park and prohibited various activities. The Great Barrier Reef Marine Park does not include the entire Great Barrier Reef Province. The park is managed, in partnership with the Government of Queensland, through the Great Barrier Reef Marine Park Authority to ensure that it is used in a sustainable manner. A combination of zoning, management plans, permits, education and incentives (such as eco-tourism certification) are employed in the effort to conserve the reef.

In 1999, the Australian Parliament passed the Environment Protection and Biodiversity Conservation Act, which improved the operation of national environmental law by providing guidance about regional biodiversity conservation priorities. The marine bioregional planning process came from the implementation of this law. This process conserves marine biodiversity by considering the whole ecosystem a species is in and how different species interact in the marine environment.

There are two steps to this process. The first step is to identify regional conservation priorities in the five (currently) different marine regions. The second step is to identify marine reserves (protected areas or marine parks) to be added to Australia's National Representative System of Marine Protected Areas. Like protected areas on land, marine reserves are created to protect biodiversity for generations to come. Marine reserves are identified based on criteria written in a document created by Australian and New Zealand Environment and Conservation Council called "Guidelines for establishing the national representative system of marine protected areas", also known as just "the Guidelines". These guidelines are nationally recognised and implemented at the local level based on the Australian policy for implementation outlined in the "Goals and Principles for the Establishment of the National Representative System of Marine Protected Areas in Commonwealth Waters". These policies are in place to make sure that a marine reserve is only added to the NRSMPA after careful evaluation of different data.

The priorities for each region are created based on human and environmental threats and the Marine Bioregional Plans are drafted to address these priorities. To assess different region's priorities, three steps are taken, first, a bioregional profile is created, second, a bioregional plan is drafted, and third, the plan is finalised. After the plan is finalised, activity in different bioregions may become limited based on particular threats an activity may pose.

In 2001, the GBRMPA released a report about the declining water quality in the Great Barrier Reef and detailed the importance of this issue. In response to this report, in 2003, the Australian and Queensland governments launched a joint initiative to improve the quality of water entering the Great Barrier Reef. The decline in the quality of water over the past 150 years (due to development) has contributed to coral bleaching, algal blooms, and pesticide pollution. These forms of pollution have made the reef less resilient to climate change.

When the plan was introduced in October 2003, it originally contained 65 actions built on previous legislation. Their immediate goal was to halt and reverse the decline in water quality entering the reef by 2013. By 2020, they hope that the quality of the water entering in the reef improves enough so that it doesn't have a detrimental impact on the health of the Great Barrier Reef. To achieve these goals they decided to reduce pollutants in the water entering the reef and to rehabilitate and conserve areas of the reef that naturally help reduce water pollutants. To achieve the objectives described above, this plan focuses on non-point sources of pollution, which cannot be traced to a single source such as a waste outlet.

The plan specifically targets nutrients, pesticides and sediment that make their way into the reef as a result of agricultural activities. Other non-point sources of pollution that are attributed to urban areas are covered under different legislation. In 2009, the plan was updated. The updated version states that to date, none of the efforts undertaken to improve the quality of water entering the reef has been successful. The new plan attempts to address this issue by "targeting priority outcomes, integrating industry and community initiatives and incorporating new policy and regulatory frameworks (Reef Plan 5)". This updated version has improved the clarity of the previous plan and targets set by that plan, have improved accountability and further improved monitoring and assessment. The 2009 report found that 41 out of the 65 actions met their original goals, however, 18 were not progressing well according to evaluation criteria as well as 6 were rated as having unsatisfactory levels of progress.

Some key achievements made since the plan's initial passing in 2003 were the establishment of the Reef Quality Partnership to set targets, report findings and monitor progress towards targets, improved land condition by landowners was rewarded with extended leases, Water Quality Improvement Plans were created to identify regional targets and identified management changes that needed to be made to reach those targets, Nutrient Management Zones have been created to combat sediment loss in particular areas, education programs have been started to help gather support for sustainable agriculture, changes to land management practices have taken place through the implementation of the Farm Management Systems and codes of practice, the creation of the Queensland Wetland program and other achievements were made to help improve the water quality flowing into the coral reefs.

A taskforce of scientists was also created to assess the impact of different parts of the plan on the quality of water flowing into the coral reefs. They found that many of the goals have yet to be reached but found more evidence that states that improving the water quality of the Great Barrier Reef will improve its resilience to climate change. The Reefocus summit in 2008, which is also detailed in the report, came to similar conclusions. After this, a stakeholder working group was formed that worked between several groups as well as the Australian and Queensland governments to update reef goals and objectives. The updated version of the plan focuses on strategic priority areas and actions to achieve 2013 goals. Also quantitative targets have been made to critically assess whether targets are being met.

Some examples of the water quality goals outlined by this plan are that by 2013, there will be a 50% reduction in nitrogen and phosphorus loads at the end of catchments and that by 2020, there will be a reduction in sediment load by 20%. The plan also outlines a number of steps that must be taken by landholders to help improve grazing, soil, nutrient, and chemical management practices. There are also a number of supporting initiatives to take place outlined in the plan to help create a framework to improve land use practices which will in turn improve water quality.

Through these means the governments of Australia and Queensland hope to improve water quality by 2013. The 2013 outlook report and revised water quality plan will assess what needs to be done in the future to improve water quality and the livelihoods of the wildlife that resides there.

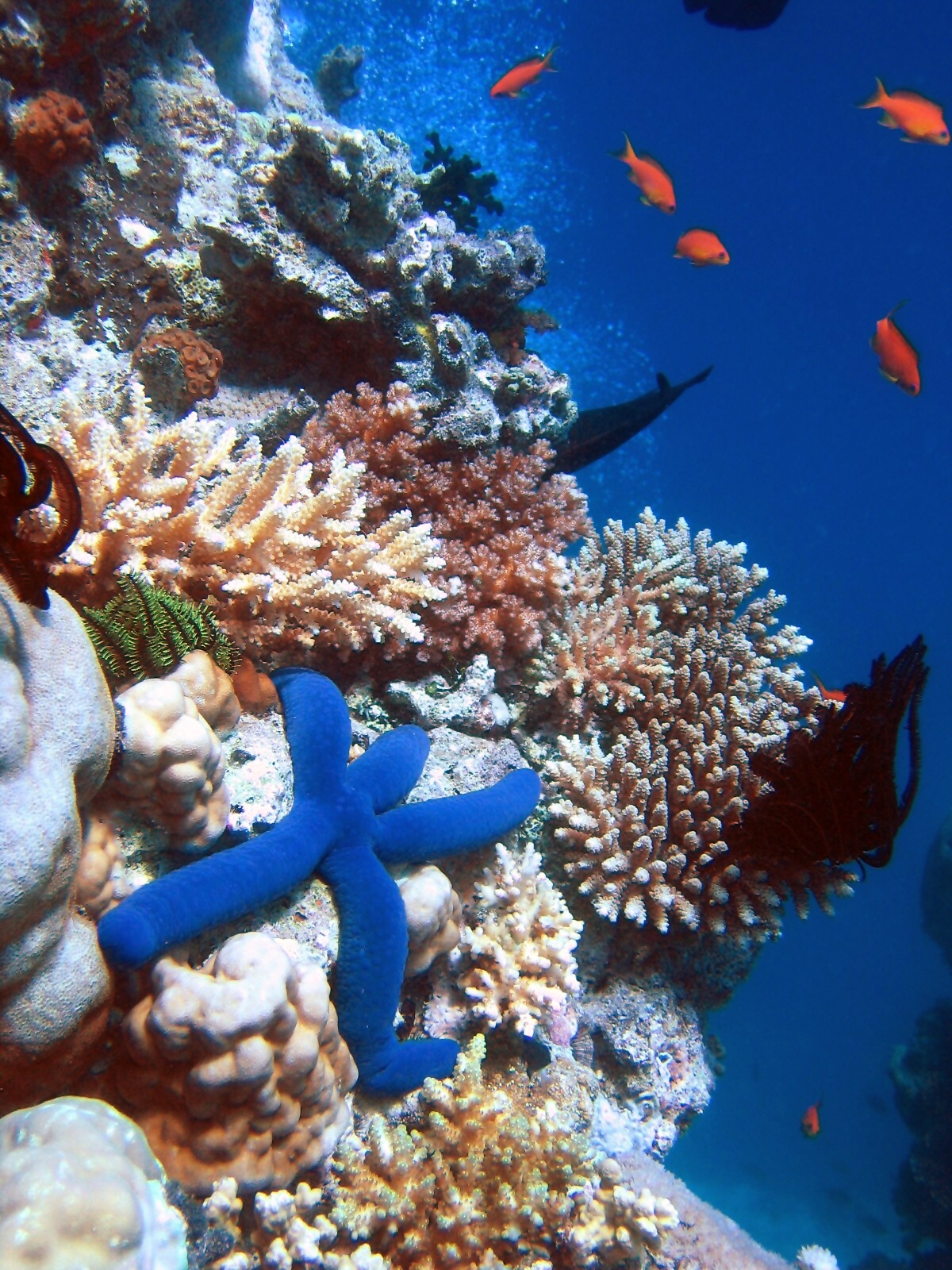
A blue starfish (Linckia laevigata) resting on hard Acropora and Porites corals

In July 2004, a new zoning plan took effect for the entire Marine Park, and has been widely acclaimed as a new global benchmark for marine ecosystem conservation. The rezoning was based on the application of systematic conservation planning techniques, using marxan software. While protection across the Marine Park was improved, the highly protected zones increased from 4.5% to over 33.3%. At the time, it was the largest Marine Protected Area in the world, although in 2006, the new Northwestern Hawaiian Islands National Monument became the largest.

In 2006, a review of the Great Barrier Reef Marine Park Act of 1975 recommended that there should be no further zoning plan changes until 2013, and that every five years, a peer-reviewed outlook report should be published, examining the reef's health, management, and environmental pressures. In each outlook report, several assessments are required. Each assessment has a set of assessment criteria that allows for better presentation of available evidence. Each assessment is judged by these criteria and given a grade. Every outlook report follows the same judging and grading process so that information can be tracked over time. No new research is done to produce the report. Only readily available information goes into the report so little of what is known about the Reef is actually featured in each outlook report.

==== Abbot Point coal port dredge dumping controversy ====
In December 2013, Greg Hunt, the Australian environment minister, approved a plan for dredging to create three shipping terminals as part of the construction of a coalport. According to corresponding approval documents, the process will create around 3 million cubic metres of dredged seabed that will be dumped within the Great Barrier Reef marine park area.

On 31 January 2014, the GBRMPA issued a dumping permit that will allow three million cubic metres of sea bed from Abbot Point, north of Bowen, to be transported and unloaded in the waters of the Great Barrier Reef Marine Park. Potential significant harms have been identified in relation to dredge spoil and the process of churning up the sea floor in the area and exposing it to air: firstly, new research shows the finer particles of dredge spoil can cloud the water and block sunlight, thereby starving sea grass and coral up to distances of 80 km away from the point of origin due to the actions of wind and currents. Furthermore, dredge spoil can literally smother reef or sea grass to death, while storms can repeatedly resuspend these particles so that the harm caused is ongoing; secondly, disturbed sea floor can release toxic substances into the surrounding environment.

The dredge spoil from the Abbot Point port project is to be dumped 24 kilometres (15 mi) away, near Bowen in north Queensland, and the approval from the Authority will result in the production of an extra 70 million tonnes of coal annually, worth between A$1.4 billion and $2.8 billion. Authority chairman, Dr Russell Reichelt, stated after the confirmation of the approval:

This approval is in line with the agency's view that port development along the Great Barrier Reef coastline should be limited to existing ports. As a deepwater port that has been in operation for nearly 30 years, Abbot Point is better placed than other ports along the Great Barrier Reef coastline to undertake expansion as the capital and maintenance dredging required will be significantly less than what would be required in other areas. It's important to note the seafloor of the approved disposal area consists of sand, silt and clay and does not contain coral reefs or seagrass beds.

The approval was provided with a corresponding set of 47 new environmental conditions that include the following:

- A long-term water quality monitoring plan extending five years after the disposal activity is completed.
- A heritage management plan to protect the Catalina second world war aircraft wreck in Abbot Bay.
- The establishment of an independent dredging and disposal technical advice panel and a management response group, to include community representatives.

The Australian Federal Government announced on 13 November that there would now be a ban on the dumping of dredge spoil in the Great Barrier Reef Marine Park. The World Heritage Committee asked Environment Minister Greg Hunt to investigate alternative options to dump on land instead. The Queensland government and the Commonwealth have now accepted the alternative option and advice from The World Heritage Committee and will now commence dumping on land.

=== Tourism ===
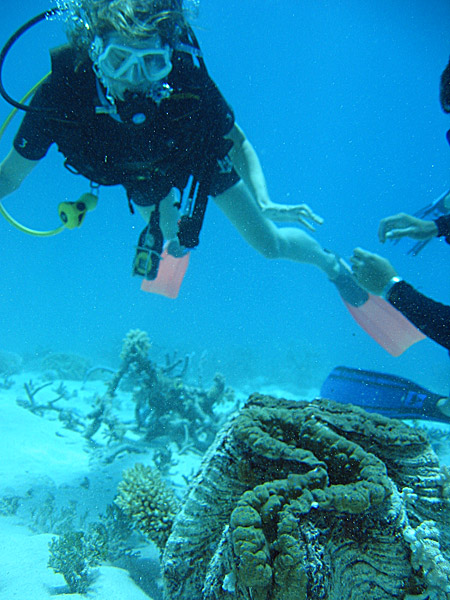
A scuba diver looking at a giant clam on the Great Barrier Reef

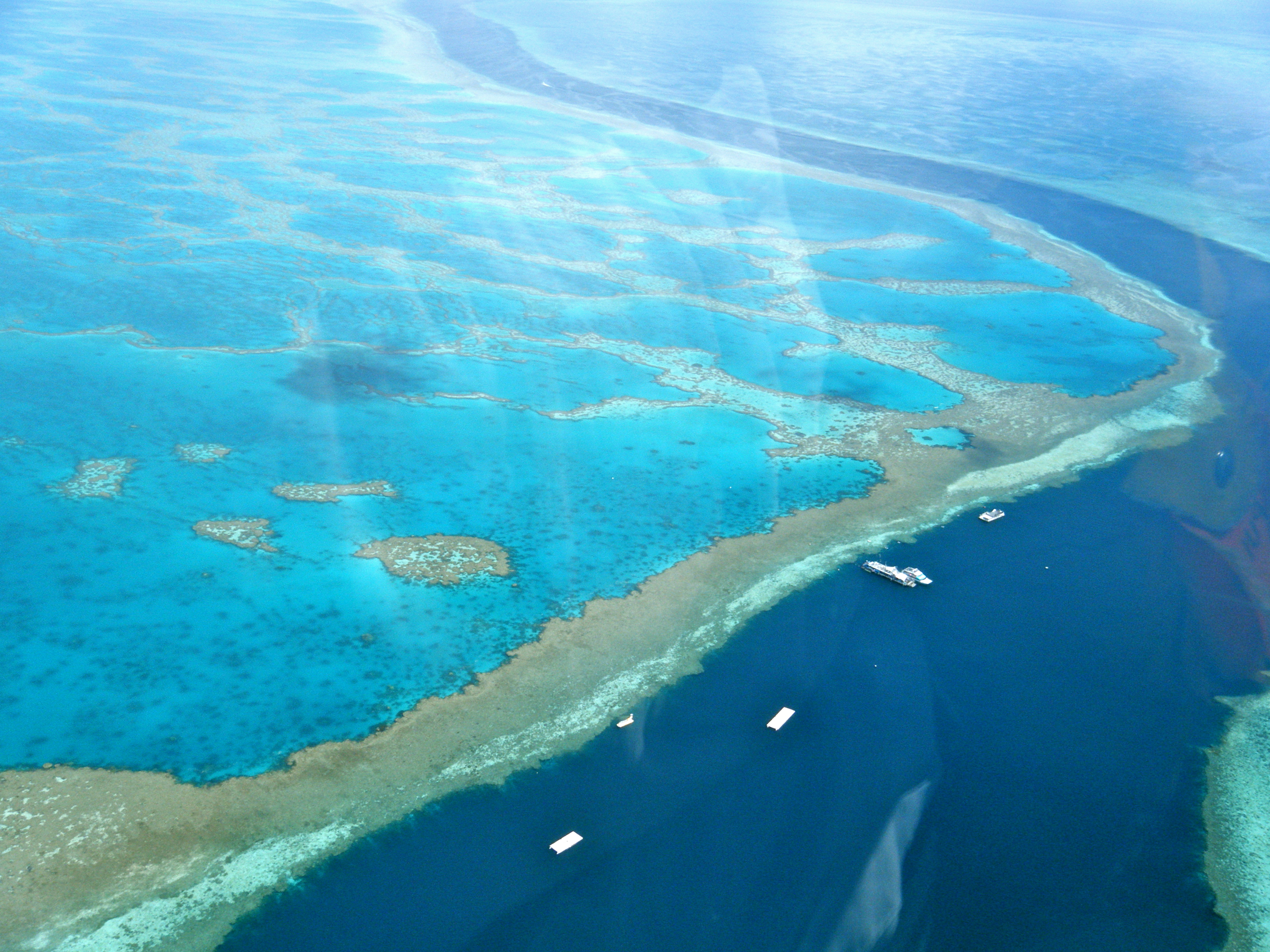
Helicopter view of the reef and boats

Due to its vast biodiversity, warm clear waters and accessibility from the tourist boats called "live aboards", the reef is a very popular destination, especially for scuba divers. Tourism on the Great Barrier Reef is concentrated in Cairns and also The Whitsundays due to their accessibility. These areas make up 7–8% of the park's area. The Whitsundays and Cairns have their own Plans of Management. Many cities along the Queensland coast offer daily boat trips. Several continental and coral cay islands are now resorts, including Green Island and Lady Elliot Island. As of 1996, 27 islands on the Great Barrier Reef supported resorts.

In 1996, most of the tourism in the region was domestically generated and the most popular visiting times were during the Australian winter. At this time, it was estimated that tourists to the Great Barrier Reef contributed A$776 million per annum. As the largest commercial activity in the region, it was estimated in 2003 that tourism generated over A$4 billion annually, and the 2005 estimate increased to A$5.1 billion. A Deloitte report published by the Great Barrier Reef Marine Park Authority in March 2013 states that the Reef's 2,000 kilometres of coastline attracts tourism worth A$6.4 billion annually and employs more than 64,000 people.

Approximately two million people visit the Great Barrier Reef each year. Although most of these visits are managed in partnership with the marine Tourism industry, there is a concern among the general public that tourism is harmful to the Great Barrier Reef.

A variety of boat tours and cruises are offered, from single day trips, to longer voyages. Boat sizes range from dinghies to superyachts. Glass-bottomed boats and underwater observatories are also popular, as are helicopter flights. By far, the most popular tourist activities on the Great Barrier Reef are snorkelling and diving, for which pontoons are often used, and the area is often enclosed by nets. The outer part of the Great Barrier Reef is favoured for such activities, due to water quality.

Management of tourism in the Great Barrier Reef is geared towards making tourism ecologically sustainable. A daily fee is levied that goes towards research of the Great Barrier Reef. This fee ends up being 20% of the GBRMPA's income. Policies on cruise ships, bareboat charters, and anchorages limit the traffic on the Great Barrier Reef.

The problems that surround ecotourism in the Great Barrier Reef revolve around permanent tourism platforms. Platforms are large, ship-like vessels that act as a base for tourists while scuba diving and snorkelling in the Great Barrier Reef. Seabirds will land on the platforms and defecate which will eventually be washed into the sea. The feces carry nitrogen, phosphorus and often DDT and mercury, which cause aspergillosis, yellow-band disease, and black band disease. Areas without tourism platforms have 14 out of 9,468 (1.1%) diseased corals versus areas with tourism platforms that have 172 out of 7,043 (12%) diseased corals. Tourism is a major economic activity for the region. Thus, while non-permanent platforms could be possible in some areas, overall, permanent platforms are likely a necessity. Solutions have been suggested to siphon bird waste into gutters connecting to tanks helping lower runoff that causes coral disease.

The Great Barrier Reef Marine Park Authority has also placed many permanent anchorage points around the general use areas. These act to reduce damage to the reef due to anchoring destroying soft coral, chipping hard coral, and disturbing sediment as it is dragged across the bottom. Tourism operators also must comply with speed limits when travelling to or from tourist destinations, to prevent excessive wake from the boats disturbing the reef ecosystem.

=== Fishing ===
The fishing industry in the Great Barrier Reef, controlled by the Queensland Government, is worth 1 billion Australian Dollars annually. It employs approximately 2000 people, and fishing in the Great Barrier Reef is pursued commercially, for recreation, and as a traditional means for feeding one's family.

=== Dugong hunting ===
Under the Native Title Act 1993, native title holders retain the right to legally hunt dugongs and green turtles for "personal, domestic or non-commercial communal needs".

Four traditional owners groups agreed to cease the hunting of dugongs in the area in 2011 due to their declining numbers, partially accelerated by seagrass damage from Cyclone Yasi.

== See also ==
- Catlin Seaview Survey
- Coral Triangle
- Galápagos Islands
- Great Barrier Reef Committee (1922–1982)
- Great Southern Reef
- Islands on the Great Barrier Reef
- Komodo National Park
- List of reefs
- Ocean acidification in the Great Barrier Reef
- Sixth extinction
- Valdes Peninsula
