= Water extraction =

Process of taking water from any source

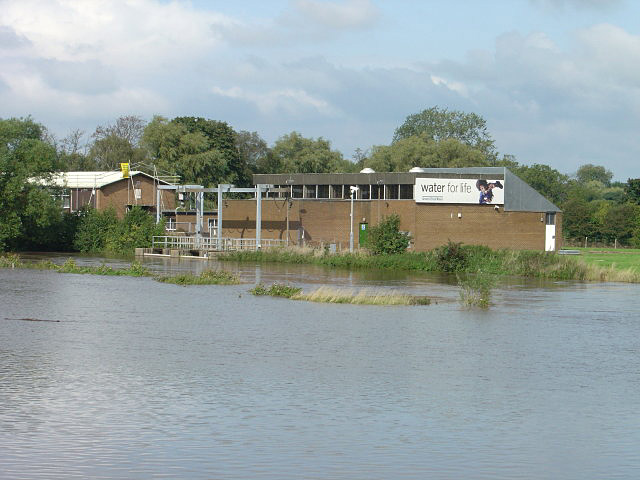
Water extraction plant alongside the flooding River Dove near Egginton, England, UK

Water extraction (also known as water withdrawal, water abstraction, and water intake) is the process of taking water from any source, either temporarily or permanently, for flood control or to obtain water for purposes such as irrigation. The extracted water could also be used as drinking water after suitable treatment.

Depending on the environmental legislation in the country, controls may be placed on extraction to limit the amount of water that can be removed. The over-extraction of water can lead to dry rivers or declining groundwater levels.

The science of hydrogeology is used to determine safe water extraction levels. Water can go through dams that are used to regulate or stop water from coming though, creating hydroelectricity.

== Effects of overextraction ==
=== Saltwater intrusion ===
Saltwater intrusion is the movement of saline water into freshwater aquifers, which can lead to groundwater quality degradation, including drinking water sources, and other consequences. Saltwater intrusion can naturally occur in coastal aquifers, owing to the hydraulic connection between groundwater and seawater. Because saline water has a higher mineral content than freshwater, it is denser and has a higher water pressure. As a result, saltwater can push inland beneath the freshwater. In other topologies, submarine groundwater discharge can push fresh water into saltwater.

Certain human activities, especially groundwater pumping from coastal freshwater wells, have increased saltwater intrusion in many coastal areas. Water extraction drops the level of fresh groundwater, reducing its water pressure and allowing saltwater to flow further inland. Other contributors to saltwater intrusion include navigation channels or agricultural and drainage channels, which provide conduits for saltwater to move inland. Sea level rise caused by climate change also contributes to saltwater intrusion. Saltwater intrusion can also be worsened by extreme events like hurricane storm surges.

==== Groundwater contamination ====
Groundwater contamination of water is seen vastly through the high needs of irrigation, drinking, and to support organic life. Keeping contaminants at a minimum is at a high demand and treated using arsenic, chloride and other chemicals to extract the pollutants. Humans can be a direct cause of these pollutants through over-extraction.

Certain leading causes for groundwater contamination comes from lowering water tables due to the over-extraction of water and the water table not being able to recharge as quickly as needed. With this being said, polluted water from the surface (rivers and streams), makes its way into the groundwater more quickly and easily and results in a water quality problem due to the surface water pollution. Mining, farming and industrial activities contribute to water pollution, in particular where "countries lacking adequate regulation or controls".

==== Land subsidence ====
Land subsidence is another effect linked to the over-extraction of groundwater. When large amounts of groundwater is extracted from aquifers beneath, surrounding areas above. When water from the aquifer is extracted at a large amount, the sediment, certain rock types, is separated due to the lack of water being used to make sure the sediment stays tightly together. The over-extraction of groundwater is a human caused activity that causes these ground failures that create pore spaces where water once was occupying. The sudden sinking of the soils surface causes infrastructure damage and a higher risk of flood damage due to the displacement of the Earth's surface.

== Groundwater extraction laws ==
Groundwater laws detail rights relating to water extraction and water withdrawal from aquifers.

=== United Kingdom ===
In England, anyone wishing to withdraw more than 20 cubic metres of water per day, either from a river or an aquifer, must first obtain an abstraction licence from the Environment Agency. The licensing regime was introduced in the 1960s and by the time the government's White Paper on Water was put forward in 2011, it had been recognised that the rules were no longer fit for purpose.

=== United States ===
In the United States, much of the groundwater that is mainly withdrawn or extracted from aquifers consist of primarily irrigation towards the southwest and the west, with close to 85 to 90% of available water withdrawn.

With an expected increase of the demand of water for domestic usage in the future, systems are to be regulated and land rights vary on the consumption of groundwater rights. When requirements have not been met through the water extraction, states control water resources and take steps on authorization of the requirements for groups of individuals or corporations.

== See also ==
- Atmospheric water generator
- Desalination
- Reclaimed water
- Groundwater extraction
