= Wonky =

Wonky may refer to:

- Wonky (genre), a music genre that appeared in 2006
- Wonky (album), a 2012 album by Orbital
- Wonky pop, a loose grouping of musical acts that played what the BBC called "quirky, catchy and credible pop"

== See also ==
- Wonk (disambiguation)
- Wonky hole, a submarine freshwater spring on the seabed in the Great Barrier Reef or the Gulf of Carpentaria of Queensland
