= Caroline Slomp =

Marine biogeochemist

- Born: 1967
- Education: Wageningen University
- Scientific career
- Thesis: Early diagenesis of phosphorus in continental margin sediments (1997)

Caroline P. Slomp (born 1967) is a professor at Radboud University Nijmegen who is known for her work on elemental cycling in marine environments. She is an elected fellow of the Geochemical Society and the European Association for Geochemistry.

== Education and career ==
Slomp was born in Khairagali, Pakistan and lived there until her family moved back to the Netherlands when she was nine years old. Slomp has an M.S. from Wageningen University & Research (1991). She went on to earn her Ph.D. in 1997 from Wageningen working at the Royal Netherlands Institute for Sea Research. She started at Utrecht University in 1998, and was promoted to professor in 2013. In 2022 she started a position as professor at Radboud University which is located in Nijmegen, Netherlands.

== Research ==
Slomp is known for her work on how elements cycle through marine environments, especially how both modern and ancient environments respond to environmental changes. The majority of her research is on marine environments with low oxygen concentrations. Slomp's early research examined phosphorus in marine sediments. Her subsequent research considered how submarine groundwater discharge bring nutrients to the coastal ocean and the accumulation of phosphorus in marine sapropels. In coastal sediments she has examined the oxidation of methane and how bacterial cells control the interactions between iron and phosphorus. Her work with bacteria in marine sediments has led to work on how to use bacteria to generate power from wastewater.

== Awards and honors ==
In 2015 the Royal Physiographic Society in Lund elected Slomp a lifetime fellow. In 2018 she was named the Paul Gast lecturer by the Geochemical Society and European Association for Geochemistry, and in 2020 they elected Slomp as fellow. Slomp was elected a member of the Royal Netherlands Academy of Arts and Sciences in 2024.

== Selected publications ==
- Slomp, C. P.; Van der Gaast, S. J.; Van Raaphorst, W. (1996-03-01). "Phosphorus binding by poorly crystalline iron oxides in North Sea sediments". Marine Chemistry. 52 (1): 55–73. Bibcode:1996MarCh..52...55S. doi:10.1016/0304-4203(95)00078-X. hdl:1874/31412. ISSN 0304-4203. S2CID 97421756.
- Slomp, Caroline P.; Epping, Eric H. G.; Helder, Willem; Raaphorst, Wim Van (1996-11-01). "A key role for iron-bound phosphorus in authigenic apatite formation in North Atlantic continental platform sediments". Journal of Marine Research. 54 (6): 1179–1205. doi:10.1357/0022240963213745.
- van der Zee, Claar; Roberts, Darryl R.; Rancourt, Denis G.; Slomp, Caroline P. (2003). "Nanogoethite is the dominant reactive oxyhydroxide phase in lake and marine sediments". Geology. 31 (11): 993. Bibcode:2003Geo....31..993V. doi:10.1130/g19924.1. hdl:1874/31393. ISSN 0091-7613. S2CID 130357956.
- Slomp, Caroline P.; Van Cappellen, Philippe (2004-08-10). "Nutrient inputs to the coastal ocean through submarine groundwater discharge: controls and potential impact". Journal of Hydrology. 295 (1): 64–86. Bibcode:2004JHyd..295...64S. doi:10.1016/j.jhydrol.2004.02.018. hdl:1874/11282. ISSN 0022-1694. S2CID 130711252.
- Conley, Daniel J.; Björck, Svante; Bonsdorff, Erik; Carstensen, Jacob; Destouni, Georgia; Gustafsson, Bo G.; Hietanen, Susanna; Kortekaas, Marloes; Kuosa, Harri; Markus Meier, H. E.; Müller-Karulis, Baerbel; Nordberg, Kjell; Norkko, Alf; Nürnberg, Gertrud; Pitkänen, Heikki (2009-05-15). "Hypoxia-Related Processes in the Baltic Sea". Environmental Science & Technology. 43 (10): 3412–3420. Bibcode:2009EnST...43.3412C. doi:10.1021/es802762a. hdl:10138/224470. ISSN 0013-936X. PMID 19544833.
