= Wonk =

Wonk may refer to:

- Wonk (long form: policy wonk), informal term for a policy analyst or other person deeply involved in details of public policy (or more loosely one who studies other highly technical material)
- Wonk (character), a character from The Adventures of Wonk by Muriel Levy
- Wonk, in the List of Bobobo-bo Bo-bobo characters
- Wonk FM, an American radio station in the Washington, DC, area on WWDC-HD2 (101.1) and W284CQ (104.7)

== See also ==
- Wonkette, an American online magazine
- Wonky (disambiguation)
