= Wonky hole =

Colloquial term for type of freshwater spring

Wonky hole is a colloquial, Australian term for a submarine groundwater discharge, a freshwater spring flowing from the seabed.

== Geography ==
Wonky holes are found in the Great Barrier Reef and the Gulf of Carpentaria, both in Queensland. Wonky holes can be found in the coral reef up to 60 km (37 mi) offshore.

== Geology ==
Wonky holes are located along riverbeds which existed in the last glacial period ending about 11,000 years ago. At that time of the last glacial maximum much of northern Europe and North America was covered by ice sheets up to 3 km (1.9 mi) thick; the water tied up in the glacial ice lowered the sea level more than 120 m (390 ft). The sediment in the submerged river beds from that period has been covered with coral in many places. Since the sediment is more permeable than the surrounding materials, it channels fresh water to thin spots in the coral, creating the fresh water springs called wonky holes.

The nutrients carried by the fresh water attract fish and fishermen. Coral does not grow well in the fresh water, resulting in irregular growth around wonky holes. The rough bottoms around the outlet tend to capture fishing nets.

Around 200 holes are known along the coast between Townsville and Cape York. Water flowing along the submarine riverbeds and exiting at wonky holes can be charged with nutrients carried from the mainland. These can cause eutrophication in the Great Barrier Reef lagoon.

== In literature ==
A wonky hole makes a brief appearance in the science fiction novel, Camouflage.
