= Dugong hunting in Australia =

Hunting practice

Dugong hunting in Australia is not prohibited; however, the practise is heavily regulated. Dugongs are protected throughout Australia, although the rules vary by state; in some areas Indigenous hunting is allowed. Dugongs are listed under the Nature Conservation Act in the Australian state of Queensland as vulnerable. Most currently live in established marine parks, where boats must travel at a restricted speed and mesh net fishing is restricted.

Dugong hunting has been practised in Wide Bay–Burnett in Queensland since at least 1861. Commercial netting began in 1924. The dugong was a prized source of oil, hide, and meat, and charcoal from their bones was used in sugar refining. The practice was banned in 1965, apart from a limited catch by Indigenous Australians, who used dugongs as a food source since before the arrival of European settlers. The Native Title Act 1993 allows for traditional owners to hunt both turtles and dugongs.

== History ==
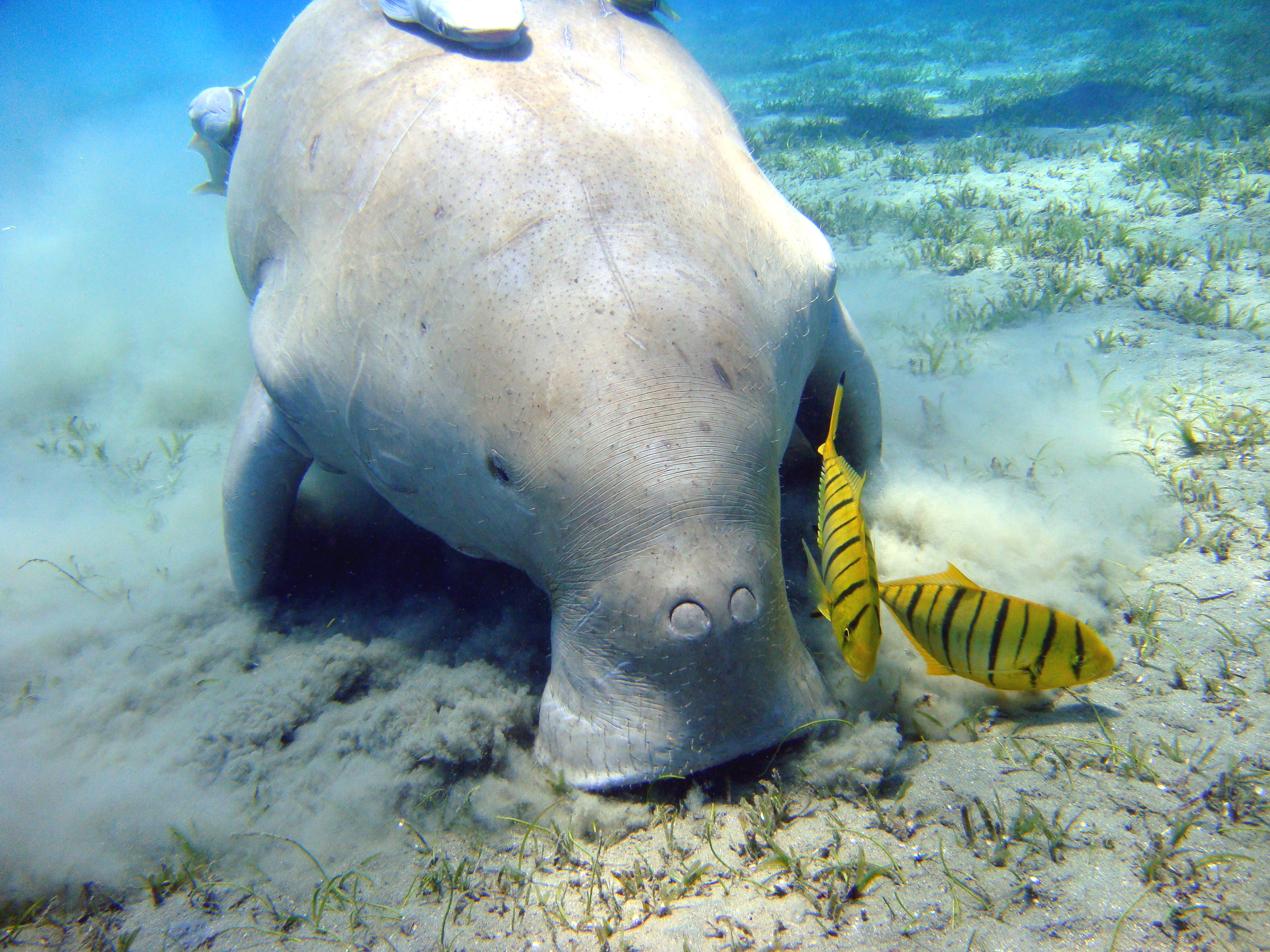
Dugong

Hunting of dugongs for their flesh and oil which was exported to Europe for medicinal purposes began in the 1850s. Apart from the traditional aboriginal hunters, it is difficult to place precisely when dugong hunting commenced in the waters of the Wide Bay. One of the first references we have of this activity was recorded in the Maryborough Chronicle in August 1861 when a report claimed that a man named Thomas Gees, who was employed in 'dugong fishing' in Hervey Bay.

John Lionel Ching during the 1870s and 1880s, was the person who primarily controlled the Dugong industry in Wide Bay and Hervey's Bay. Ching's method of catching the mammals was to string a long net across the mouths of estuaries and creeks where the dugongs were grazing on sea grasses. The dugong could then be driven into the nets where they would become entangled and finally drown; he would sell the flesh and oil to a ready market in Maryborough and elsewhere. His production plant was based at Stewart Island, opposite Boonooroo. John even perfected an ointment which he advertised in his pamphlets as being capable of curing rheumatism, bruises, sprains and other ills the flesh has. This oil was used during the First World War to relieve the suffering of soldiers who had been gassed in the trenches. However, Ching was so successful in hunting dugongs that after several years few of the mammals could be found in the region and he was forced to travel north where he soon set up another dugong processing plant.

During the 1870s, other dugong fishermen set up a small operation at Hervey Bay, building a crude hut where they carried out the boiling down of the mammals. Their work was only modestly successful and they later gave up the venture.

Commercial netting began in 1924 where the dugongs were netted, brought to the surface and then shot. Prior to the banning of the trade in 1965, dugong oil was a popular Australian product. Brisbane chemists bought it in large quantities and it was also used in the production of cosmetics. Dugong bone, when turned into charcoal, was said to be the best charcoal for sugar refining.

A ban on hunting dugongs in Moreton Bay was enacted on 20 March 1969.

== Current practice ==
Indigenous people are still allowed to hunt a small number of sea cows; however, this has had little impact on the population, with Indigenous Australians playing a large role in helping preserve the population. Common ways that Indigenous hunt dugong is through the use of aluminium dinghies powered by outboard motors. A harpoon or more commonly a rifle or shotgun is then used to incapacitate the animal before it is tied up and drowned. Another method used tethering dugong calves to the dinghy in order to attract other mature dugongs that can also be killed.

Factors, such as metal pollution and human clearance of seagrass, the dugong's main food source, have contributed to the decline. However, the current dugong population of Australia is comparatively healthy, and is under limited threat, except in Eastern Queensland.
