= Submarine groundwater discharge =

Flow of groundwater into the sea below sea level

Submarine groundwater discharge (SGD) is a hydrological process which commonly occurs in coastal areas. It is described as submarine inflow of fresh-, and brackish groundwater from land into the sea. Submarine groundwater discharge is controlled by several forcing mechanisms, which cause a hydraulic gradient between land and sea. Considering the different regional settings the discharge occurs either as (1) a focused flow along fractures in karst and rocky areas, (2) a dispersed flow in soft sediments, or (3) a recirculation of seawater within marine sediments. Submarine groundwater discharge plays an important role in coastal biogeochemical processes and hydrological cycles such as the formation of offshore plankton blooms, hydrological cycles, and the release of nutrients, trace elements and gases. It affects coastal ecosystems and has been used as a freshwater resource by some local communities for millennia.

== Forcing mechanisms ==
In coastal areas the groundwater and seawater flows are driven by a variety of factors. Both types of water can circulate in marine sediments due to tidal pumping, waves, bottom currents or density driven transport processes. Meteoric freshwaters can discharge along confined and unconfined aquifers into the sea or the oppositional process of seawater intruding into groundwater charged aquifers can take place. The flow of both fresh and sea water is primarily controlled by the hydraulic gradients between land and sea and differences in the densities between both waters and the permeabilities of the sediments.

According to Drabbe and Badon-Ghijben (1888) and Herzberg (1901), the thickness of a freshwater lens below sea level (z) corresponds with the thickness of the freshwater level above sea level (h) as:

z= ρf/((ρs-ρf))*h

With z being the thickness between the saltwater-freshwater interface and the sea level, h being the thickness between the top of the freshwater lens and the sea level, ρf being the density of freshwater and ρs being the density of saltwater. Including the densities of freshwater (ρf = 1.00 g •cm-3) and seawater (ρs = 1.025 g •cm-3) equation (2) simplifies to:

z=40*h

Together with Darcy's law, the length of a salt wedge from the shoreline into the hinterland can be calculated:

L= ((ρs-ρf)Kf m)/(ρf Q)

With Kf being the hydraulic conductivity, m the aquifer thickness and Q the discharge rate. Assuming an isotropic aquifer system the length of a salt wedge solely depends on the hydraulic conductivity, the aquifer thickness and is inversely related to the discharge rate. These assumptions are only valid under hydrostatic conditions in the aquifer system. In general the interface between fresh and saline water forms a zone of transition due to diffusion/dispersion or local anisotropy.

== Methods ==
The first study about submarine groundwater discharge was done by Sonrel (1868), who speculated on the risk of submarine springs for sailors. However, until the mid-1990s, SGD remained rather unrecognized by the scientific community because it was hard to detect and measure the freshwater discharge. The first elaborated method to study SGD was done by Moore (1996), who used radium-226 as a tracer for groundwater. Since then several methods and instruments have been developed to attempt to detect and quantify discharge rates.

=== Radium-226 ===
The first study which detected and quantified submarine groundwater discharge on a regional basis was done by Moore (1996) in the South Atlantic Bight off South Carolina. He measured enhanced radium-226 concentrations within the water column near shore and up to about 100 kilometres (62 mi) from the shoreline. Radium-226 is a decay product of thorium-230, which is produced within sediments and supplied by rivers. However, these sources could not explain the high concentrations present in the study area. Moore (1996) hypothesized that submarine groundwater, enriched in radium-226, was responsible for the high concentrations. This hypothesis has been tested numerous times at sites around the world and confirmed at each site.

=== Seepage meter ===
Lee (1977) designed a seepage meter, which consists of a chamber which is connected to a sampling port and a plastic bag. The chamber is inserted into the sediment and water discharging through the sediments is caught within the plastic bag. The change in volume of water which is caught in the plastic bag over time represents the freshwater flux.

=== Pore water profiles ===
According to Schlüter et al. (2004) chloride pore water profiles can be used to investigate submarine groundwater discharge. Chloride can be used as a conservative tracer, as it is enriched in seawater and depleted in groundwater. Three different shapes of chloride pore water profiles reflect three different transport modes within marine sediments. A chloride profile showing constant concentrations with depth indicates that no submarine groundwater is present. A chloride profile with a linear decline indicates a diffusive mixing between groundwater and seawater and a concave shaped chloride profile represents an advective admixture of submarine groundwater from below. Stable isotope ratios in the water molecule may also be used to trace and quantify the sources of a submarine groundwater discharge.

== See also ==
- Wonky hole, freshwater submarine exit points for coral and sediment covered sediment filled old river channels
