= Acropora pharaonis =

Conservation status
- Endangered (IUCN 3.1)

Scientific classification
- Kingdom: Animalia
- Phylum: Cnidaria
- Subphylum: Anthozoa
- Class: Hexacorallia
- Order: Scleractinia
- Family: Acroporidae
- Genus: Acropora
- Species: A. pharaonis

Binomial name
- Acropora pharaonis (Milne-Edwards & Haime, 1860)

Synonyms
- List: Acropora pustulosa (Milne Edwards, 1960); Acropora scandens (Klunzinger, 1879); Madrepora arabica Milne Edwards, 1960; Madrepora ehrenbergi Milne Edwards, 1960; Madrepora microcyathus Klunzinger, 1879; Madrepora pharaonis Milne Edwards, 1960; Madrepora pustulosa Milne Edwards, 1960; Madrepora scandens Klunzinger, 1879; Madrepora spinulosa Klunzinger, 1879; Madrepora subtilis Klunzinger, 1879

Species of coral

Acropora pharaonis is a species of acroporid coral that was first described by Milne-Edwards and Haime in 1860. Found in marine, tropical, reefs on slopes sheltered from wave action, it occurs at depths of between 5 and 25 m (16 and 82 ft). It is classed as a vulnerable species on the IUCN Red List, and it has a decreasing population. It is common and found over a large area and is classified under CITES Appendix II.

== Description ==
Acropora pharaonis is found in colonies of flat table-like structures, or simply in structures of clumped vertical or horizontal twisted branches. Colonies can have heights over 2 metres (6 ft 7 in) and they are orderly and symmetrical. Branchlets are of lengths up to 250 millimetres (9.8 in) with diameters of 10 to 25 millimetres (0.39 to 0.98 in) and branchlets can reach 20 millimetres (0.79 in) long and have 3 to 8 millimetres (0.12 to 0.31 in) diameters. Brown-grey in colour with branches having pale tips, the branches become thinner towards the ends and contain many small branchlets, which contain axial, incipient axial, and radial corallites. The axial corallites, located on the ends of the branchlets, are small with outer diameters of between 1.5 and 2.6mm and inner diameters of 0.6-1.5mm. Incipient axial corallites frequently occur on the branchlets, giving them a spikey surface. The radial corallites are located in close proximity and contain small nose-shaped openings and randomly placed spinules. This species looks similar to Acropora clathrata, Acropora parapharaonis, and Acropora plumosa. It is found in a marine environment on the slopes of tropical reefs at depths between 5 and 25 m (16 and 82 ft). Its mineralised tissue is composed of aragonite (calcium carbonate).

== Distribution ==
Acropora pharaonis is common and found over a large range; the Indian Ocean, the Red Sea, the Persian Gulf, the Gulf of Aden, New Caledonia, Fiji, American Samoa, and potentially in Cocos-Keeling. It is threatened by climate change, coral disease, rising sea temperatures leading to bleaching, reef destruction, being prey to Acanthaster planci, and human activity. It is rated as a vulnerable species on the IUCN Red List, is listed CITES Appendix II, and could occur within Marine Protected Areas.

== Taxonomy ==
It was first described by Haime and Henri Milne-Edwards in 1860 in genus Madrepora.
