= Acropora kosurini =

Conservation status
- Endangered (IUCN 3.1)

Scientific classification
- Kingdom: Animalia
- Phylum: Cnidaria
- Subphylum: Anthozoa
- Class: Hexacorallia
- Order: Scleractinia
- Family: Acroporidae
- Genus: Acropora
- Species: A. kosurini

Binomial name
- Acropora kosurini Wallace, 1994

Species of coral

Acropora kosurini is a species of acroporid coral that was first described by C. C. Wallace in 1994. Found in marine, shallow reefs, it occurs at depths of 8 to 20 m (26 to 66 ft). It is listed as a vulnerable species on the IUCN Red List, and it is believed to have a decreasing population. It is rare but found over a large area, and is listed on CITES Appendix II.

== Description ==
Acropora kosurini forms in corymbose colonies, and the branches are long and become thinner towards the ends. Its branches have diameters of 4 to 12 millimetres (0.16 to 0.47 in) and lengths of up to 100 millimetres (3.9 in). Branchlets contain axial corallites on the ends, which are rounded. Radial corallites are present on the sides of the branches and have outer diameters of up to 2.7mm, which are located close together and contain small openings. There is a mixture of sizes of corallites, and the larger ones are the same size and orderly. The species is brown in colour. It is similar to Acropora divaricata, Acropora variabilis, and Acropora hoeksemai. It occurs on the slopes of shallow reefs in marine environments, and also on reef walls. It exists at depths of between 8 and 20 m (26 and 66 ft), and reaches maturity at between three and eight years. It is composed of aragonite (calcium carbonate).

== Distribution ==
Acropora kosurini is rare but found over a large range; the Indian Ocean, Australia, the Indo-Pacific, Thailand, the Philippines, the Andamans, and one region of Indonesia. It is native to Thailand, Australia, Indonesia, India, Myanmar, and the Philippines. There is no specific population data for the species, but numbers are known to be decreasing. It is affected by bleaching by rising sea temperatures, pollution, coral disease, climate change, human development, fishing, infrastructure, and may be exported for aquariums. It is classed as a vulnerable species on the IUCN Red List and under CITES Appendix II, and may occur within Marine Protected Areas.

== Taxonomy ==
It was first described by C. C. Wallace in 1994 in the North-East Indian Ocean, as Acropora kosurini.
