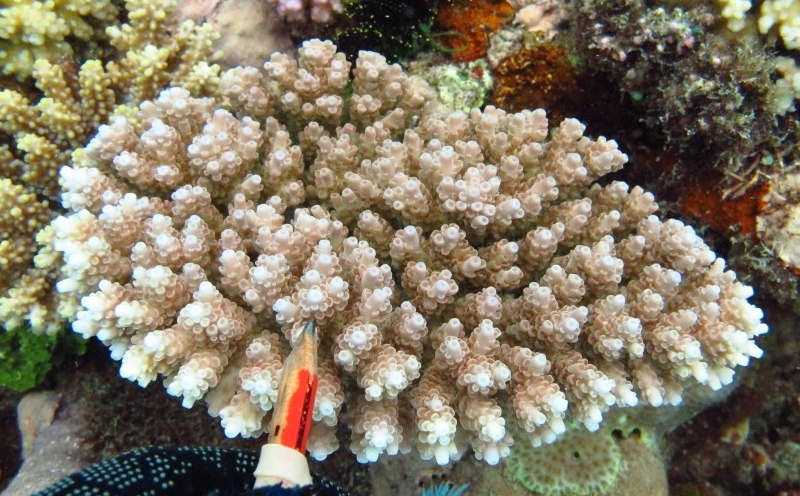

Conservation status
- Endangered (IUCN 3.1)

Scientific classification
- Kingdom: Animalia
- Phylum: Cnidaria
- Subphylum: Anthozoa
- Class: Hexacorallia
- Order: Scleractinia
- Family: Acroporidae
- Genus: Acropora
- Species: A. anthocercis

Binomial name
- Acropora anthocercis (Brook, 1893)

Synonyms
- Madrepora anthocercis Brook, 1893; Madrepora coronata Brook, 1892

= Acropora anthocercis =

Species of coral

Acropora anthocercis is a species of acroporid coral that was first described by G. Brook in 1893. Found on the top slopes of reefs, it is often in contact with strong waves. The species is rated as endangered on the IUCN Red List, with a decreasing population covering a large range, but is abundant in some areas such as Queensland. It is also listed under CITES Appendix II.

== Description ==
Acropora anthocercis specimens are found in colonies of corymbose formation on rocks. It occurs in a variety of colours; mainly purple, blue, mauve, and grey. The branches are wide and short, and are encrusted in some locations. The radial corallites (on the sides of each branch) are located close to each other, and there are many axian corallites (on the end) on each branch.

It is similar to Acropora appressa, Acropora desalwii, and Acropora parapharaonis, and is found on the upper slopes of shallow reefs, so is exposed to strong waves. It can be found at depths of 5 to 10 m (16 to 33 ft).

== Distribution ==
Acropora anthocercis can be found over a large range; the Red Sea, the Indo-Pacific, the Indian Ocean, Southeast Asia, Australia, Japan, the East China Sea, the western Pacific Ocean in marine environments, South Africa, and Mozambique. It is abundant in Queensland, with a 90% of Australian specimens believed to be in that region. It can be found at depths of 2 to 12 m (6.6 to 39.4 ft), and at temperatures between 25.61 and 26.56 °C (78.10 and 79.81 °F).

It is classed as a vulnerable species on the IUCN Red List as the population is decreasing, and is listed under Appendix II of CITES. Its population is unknown, but is likely to be threatened by the global reduction of coral reefs, the increase of temperature causing bleaching, disease, and being prey to the Acanthaster planci.

== Taxonomy ==
The species was first described by G. Brook in 1893 as Madrepora anthocercis, but was previously described as a synonym of Madrepora coronata by G. Brook in 1892.
