= Acropora awi =

Conservation status
- Endangered (IUCN 3.1)

Scientific classification
- Kingdom: Animalia
- Phylum: Cnidaria
- Subphylum: Anthozoa
- Class: Hexacorallia
- Order: Scleractinia
- Family: Acroporidae
- Genus: Acropora
- Species: A. awi

Binomial name
- Acropora awi Wallace & Wolstenholme, 1998

Species of coral

Acropora awi is a species of acroporid coral that was described by Wallace and Wolstenholme in 1998. Found in fringing reefs, the slopes of shallow reefs, and sandy slopes, it occurs in a marine environment. The species is rated as Endangered on the IUCN Red List, with a decreasing population, and is easily damaged. It can be found over a large area but is not abundant.

== Description ==
Acropora awi is found in colonies with a structure resembling bottlebrush shrubs, leading to many branches occurring in dense areas, but are mostly obvious and long. The species can be grey-brown or pink-brown in colour, and the branches are tightly packed. The axial corallites (on top of the branches) are long and fuse with some radial corallites (on the side of branches). However, there are some smaller radial corallites, which are described as being "pocket-shaped" with diameters of below 1mm. The species is similar to Acropora echinata and Acropora navini, and is found in fringing reefs, the slopes of shallow reefs, and sandy slopes. It grows to a size of 1.5 metres (4 ft 11 in).

== Distribution ==
Acropora awi is found over a large range; the Indo-Pacific, Japan, Pohnpei, the East China Sea, Micronesia, and Southeast Asia, and the Solomon Islands. The species is present in two-thirds of the regions of Indonesia, and was also found in the Marshall Islands, but there is no known population for it. It lives in marine habitats in reefs. The species is easily damaged and has a poor resistance to disease and pathogens. It is classed as an endangered species on the IUCN Red List as the population is decreasing, and is listed under Appendix II of CITES. The species is threatened by the global reduction of coral reefs, the increase of temperature causing bleaching, disease, and being prey to the Acanthaster planci, as well as its vulnerability to damage. Some of the species is within Marine Protected Areas.

== Taxonomy ==
The species was first described by Wallace and Wolstenholme in 1998 as Acropora awi.
