= Madrepora echinata =

Madrepora echinata is an unaccepted scientific name and may refer to two species of corals:

- Acropora echinata as described by Dana, 1846
- Ctenactis echinata as described by Pallas, 1766
