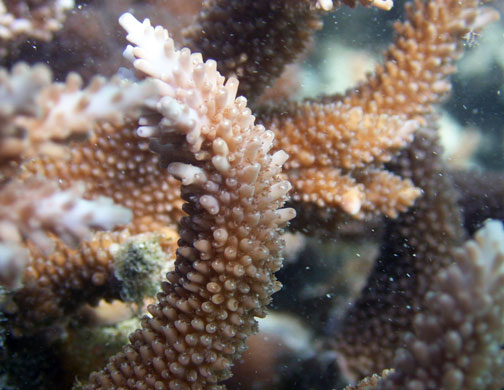

Conservation status
- Endangered (IUCN 3.1)

Scientific classification
- Kingdom: Animalia
- Phylum: Cnidaria
- Subphylum: Anthozoa
- Class: Hexacorallia
- Order: Scleractinia
- Family: Acroporidae
- Genus: Acropora
- Species: A. acuminata

Binomial name
- Acropora acuminata (Verrill, 1864)

Synonyms
- Madrepora acuminata Verrill, 1864; Madrepora diffusa Verrill, 1864; Madrepora nigra Brook, 1892

= Acropora acuminata =

Species of coral

Acropora acuminata is a species of acroporid coral found in Australia, the Red Sea, the central Indo-Pacific, Japan, the northern Indian Ocean, the East China Sea, southeast Asia, and the western Pacific Ocean. It is particularly susceptible to coral bleaching, the crown-of-thorns sea star (Acanthaster planci), and harvesting for the aquarium trade. It is found on shallow coral reefs from depths of 5–20 m. It was described by Addison Emery Verrill in 1864.

== Description ==
It is found in table-shaped colonies mainly consisting of horizontal branches, which taper to points. Corallites are not visible on the horizontal branches of specimens and form parts of the branches, while corallites on vertical branches exist in two forms, including a large tube-shaped form. It is brown or pale blue in colour and appears similar to Acropora hoeksemai. Radial corallites have nariform or oval openings and generally do not come in contact with each other.

== Distribution ==
It is classed as a vulnerable species on the IUCN Red List as the population is decreasing, and is listed under Appendix II of CITES. Its population is unknown, but is likely to be threatened by the global reduction of coral reefs, the increase of temperature causing bleaching, climate change, human activity, aquarium-related harvesting, the crown-of-thorns starfish (Acanthaster planci), and disease. It is found in the Red Sea, southeast Asia, Australia, the northern Indian Ocean, Japan, the central Indo-Pacific, the East China Sea and the western Pacific Ocean.

== Taxonomy ==
It was first described by Verrill in 1864 as Madrepora acuminata.
