= Acropora arabensis =

Conservation status
- Endangered (IUCN 3.1)

Scientific classification
- Kingdom: Animalia
- Phylum: Cnidaria
- Subphylum: Anthozoa
- Class: Hexacorallia
- Order: Scleractinia
- Suborder: Astrocoeiina
- Family: Acroporidae
- Genus: Acropora
- Species: A. arabensis

Binomial name
- Acropora arabensis (Hodgson & Carpenter, 1995)

Species of coral

Acropora arabensis is a species of acroporid coral native to the Indian Ocean and was originally described by Gregor Hodgson and Kent Carpenter in 1995. It is a locally common species usually found in upper reef slopes and lagoons, most commonly between 3 and 5 m depth. Like other species in the Acropora genus, it is susceptible to coral bleaching. It is classified as "Endangered" by the IUCN Red List and population numbers are currently decreasing.

== Description ==
Acropora arabensis has a digitate skeletal structure with infrequently dividing branches which taper at the ends. Its surface has dome-shaped axial corallites and thick-walled, strongly appressed radial corallites. Axial and radial corallites form two synapticular rings. Corallite size decreases towards the ends of the branches. Colonies that form in deeper, more protected reef areas have a tendency to form more tubular radial corralites among immersed ones. Lamellar septa are moderately well-developed and almost extend to the center with a radius about one half of calice radius.

== Distribution ==
To date, Acropora arabensis is only known to live natively off the coast of Kuwait in the Persian Gulf where the species was initially discovered. Additional specimens have been discovered in the southern Red Sea and off the northern Madagascar coast.

== Field identification ==
It is pale brown to grey in color. Similar in appearance, Acropora ocellata has longer branches and more elongate radial corallites. It can be differentiated from Acropora clathrata by its tree-like structure and its strongly appressed, regularly distributed corallites.
