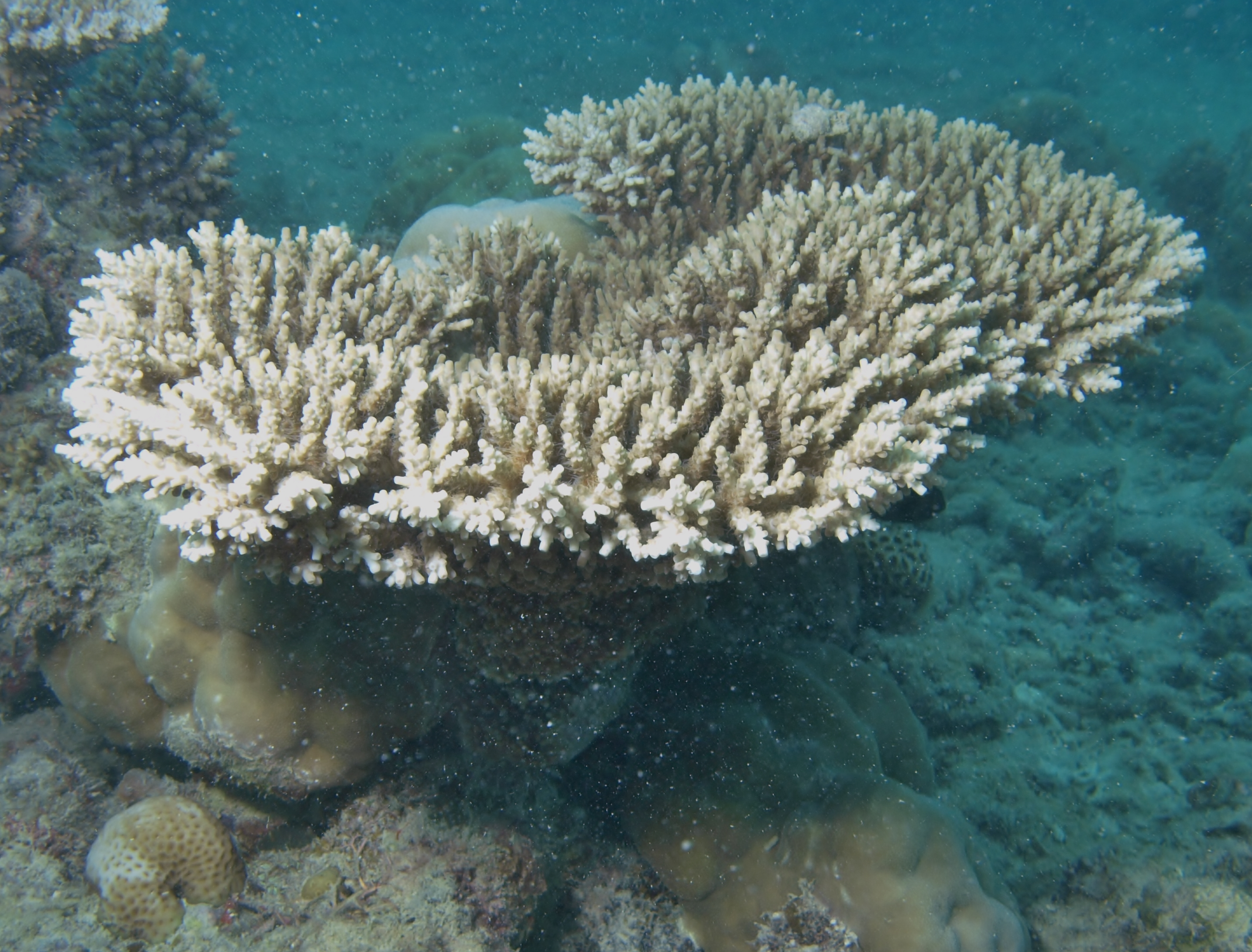

Conservation status
- Endangered (IUCN 3.1)

Scientific classification
- Kingdom: Animalia
- Phylum: Cnidaria
- Subphylum: Anthozoa
- Class: Hexacorallia
- Order: Scleractinia
- Family: Acroporidae
- Genus: Acropora
- Species: A. microclados

Binomial name
- Acropora microclados (Ehrenberg, 1834)

Synonyms
- Heteropora corymbosa (Lamarck, 1816); Heteropora microclados Ehrenberg, 1834; Madrepora assimilis Brook, 1892

= Acropora microclados =

Species of coral

Acropora microclados is a species of acroporid coral that was first described by Christian Gottfried Ehrenberg in 1834. Found in marine, tropical shallow reefs on the upper slopes, it is found at depths of 5 to 20 m (16 to 66 ft). It is listed as an endangered species on the IUCN Red List, and its population is decreasing. It is uncommon but found over a large area, including in five regions of Indonesia, and is classified under CITES Appendix II.

== Description ==
Acropora microclados is found in colonies of corymbose structures, and can be 1 m (3.3 ft) wide. The structures consist of branchlets, which are short, become thin at the ends, and orderly, and the width of the branchlet bases can reach 10 mm (0.39 in). It is usually pale pink/brown in colour, and its tentacles extend during the day, and are grey. Branchlets contain axial, incipient axial, and radial corallites. Axial corallites are located at the end of branchlets, and are tube-shaped. Incipient axial corallites frequently occur. The radial corallites occur up the sides of the branchlets, are tube-shaped, close together, and each contains nose-shaped openings. It looks similar to Acropora lamarcki, Acropora macrostoma, and Acropora massawensis. The species is found in a marine environment in tropical shallow reefs on the upper slopes, at depths of between 5 and 20 m (16 and 66 ft). It is composed of aragonite (calcium carbonate).

== Distribution ==
Acropora microclados is found over a large range and is uncommon; the Indo-Pacific Ocean, the Red Sea, the Indian Ocean, the Gulf of Aden, the East China Sea, the West Pacific, the Cook Islands, Australia, Japan, Southeast Asia, Samoa, and Chagos. It occurs in five regions of Indonesia. It occurs at temperatures of 25.48 to 27.23 °C (77.86 to 81.01 °F). There is a lack of population data for the coral, but numbers are believed to be declining. It is threatened by climate change, rising sea temperatures causing bleaching, reef destruction, coral disease, being prey to starfish Acanthaster planci, and human activity. It is classed as an endangered species on the IUCN Red List, is listed under CITES Appendix II, and might occur within Marine Protected Areas.

== Taxonomy ==
It was first described by Christian Gottfried Ehrenberg in 1834 as Heteropora microclados.
