= Madrepora prolifera =

Madrepora prolifera is an unaccepted scientific name and may refer to two species of corals:

- Acropora prolifera, found from the Gulf of Mexico and the Bahamas southwards to Colombia and Venezuela
- Lophelia pertusa, found in the North Atlantic Ocean and parts of the Caribbean Sea
