= Acropora downingi =

Conservation status
- Endangered (IUCN 3.1)

Scientific classification
- Kingdom: Animalia
- Phylum: Cnidaria
- Subphylum: Anthozoa
- Class: Hexacorallia
- Order: Scleractinia
- Family: Acroporidae
- Genus: Acropora
- Species: A. downingi

Binomial name
- Acropora downingi Wallace, 1999

Species of coral in the Indian Ocean

Acropora downingi is a species of coral in the family Acroporidae. It is native to the northwest Indian Ocean, including the Red Sea, Persian Gulf, Gulf of Aden, and the western coasts of the Arabian Sea, as well as Socotra and around Ste. Anne Island in the Seychelles. It is found at depths of 1–15 m (3–49 ft) but is most common at a depth of 2–10 m (7–33 ft). It was formally described by Australian scientist Carden Wallace in 1999.

== Description ==
Colonies are typically table-shaped, which are usually side attached, typically with horizontal radiating anastomosing branches, eventually becoming highly fused at the centre of large colonies. Branches may have upturned ends, but these are rarely vertical. The coral itself may be brown, grey, or green, commonly with pale margins.
