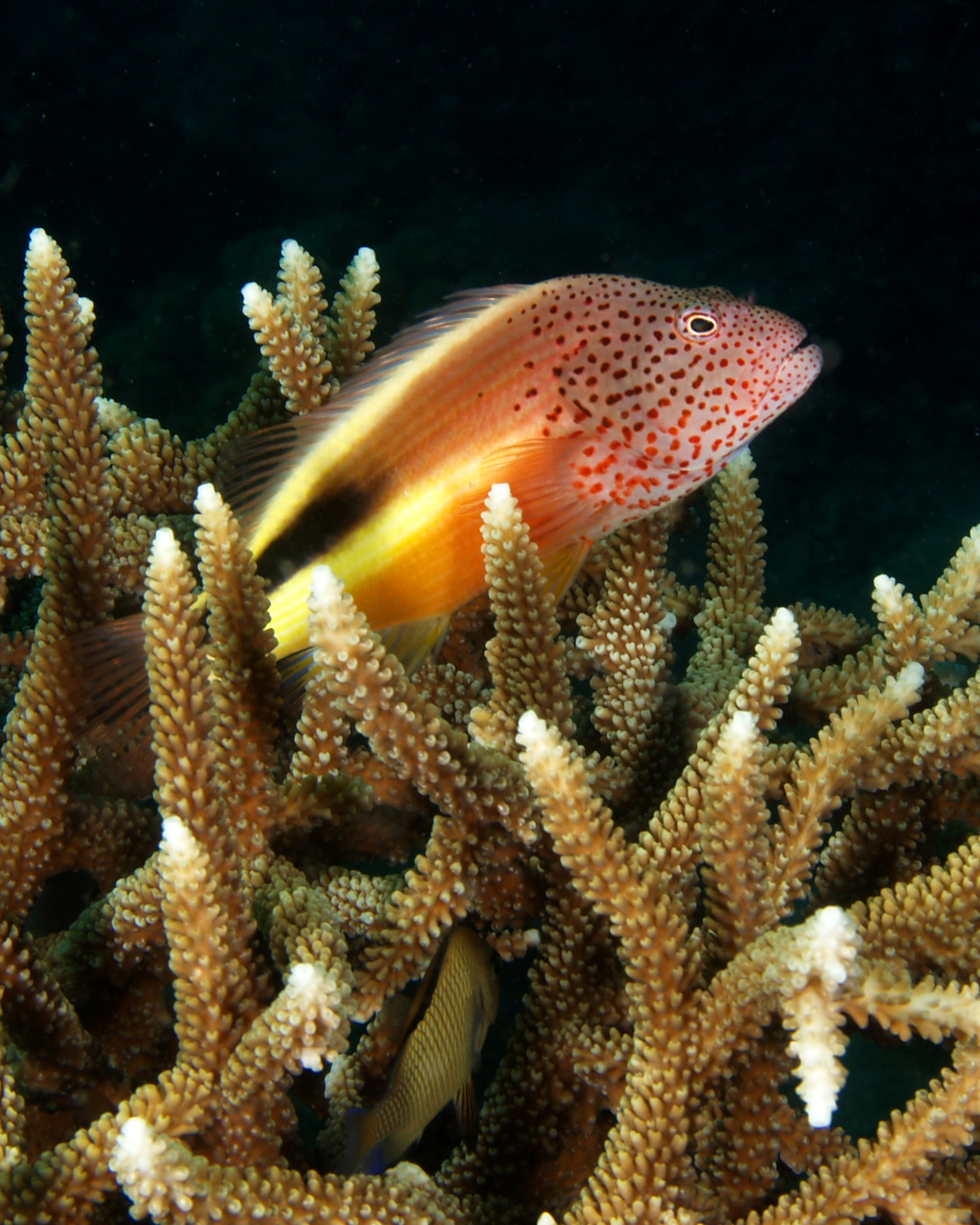
- Hawkfish (Paracirrhites forsteri) among the branch tips of Acropora grandis

Conservation status
- Endangered (IUCN 3.1)

Scientific classification
- Kingdom: Animalia
- Phylum: Cnidaria
- Subphylum: Anthozoa
- Class: Hexacorallia
- Order: Scleractinia
- Family: Acroporidae
- Genus: Acropora
- Species: A. grandis

Binomial name
- Acropora grandis (Brook, 1892)

Synonyms
- Acropora dispar Nemenzo, 1967; Madrepora grandis Brook, 1892

= Acropora grandis =

Species of coral

Acropora grandis is a species of colonial stony coral. It is a large species with multiple branches forming a bush-like structure and is found on reefs and in lagoons. It is native to the tropical western Indo-Pacific and has a range extending from East Africa to the east coast of Australia.

== Description ==
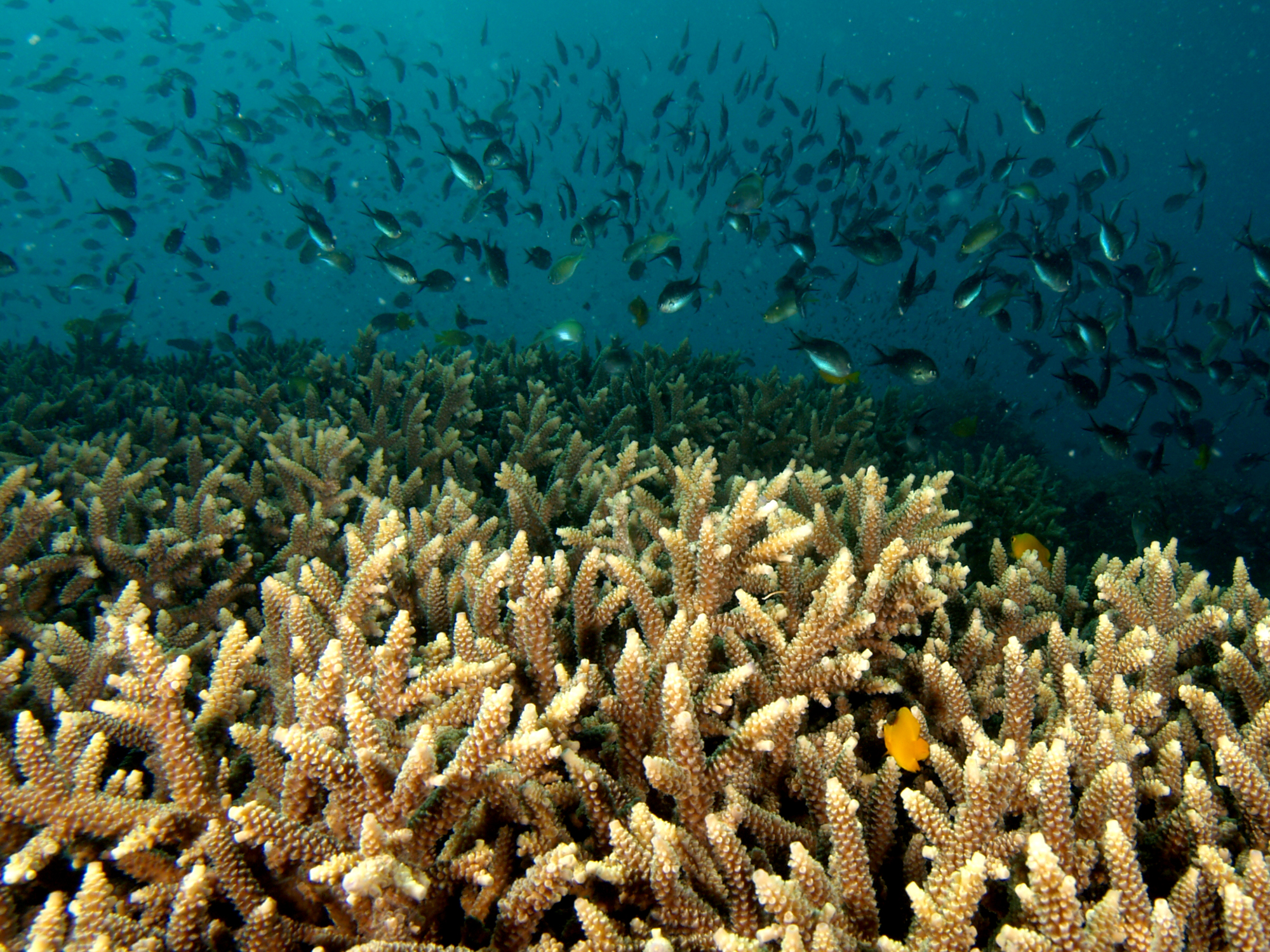
Acropora grandis forest

Acropora grandis is a colonial species of staghorn coral that can grow into a large clump as much as 7 metres (23 ft) across. In shallow water it tends to grow as a prostrate, tangled bush with thick branches but in deeper water it has a more upright and open structure. The radial corallites are varied in shape and size and those near the tips of the branches are tubular and elongated. The general colour is usually reddish-brown but can be various shades of blue, green or purple. The branch tips are a paler colour, have multiple axial corallites and are fragile and easily damaged. The polyps usually have twelve tentacles, one of which is elongated, and are connected together inside the skeleton by a maze of interconnecting channels.

== Distribution and habitat ==
Acropora grandis is found in shallow water in the western Indo-Pacific. Its range includes Madagascar, Mozambique, the Red Sea, Mauritius, Malaysia, Indonesia, New Guinea and the Great Barrier Reef. It grows in various reef locations but is more common on the upper slopes and in lagoons. The depth range is 5 to 15 metres (16 to 49 ft) and it favours a well-lit site with a strong current.

== Biology ==
Acropora grandis is a zooxanthellate species of coral. This means that it has symbiotic dinoflagellates living within its tissues. These photosynthetic microalgae, combined with pigments in the tissue, are responsible for the colour of the colony and provide a proportion of its nutritional needs.

Acropora grandis liberates its gametes into the sea where fertilisation takes place. Synchronised spawning takes place, and in the part of its range in the Northern Hemisphere, this is four or five days after the full moon. The larvae are planktonic and drift with the currents before settling on the seabed to start a new colony.

When fragments of Acropora grandis were planted into a mid-water nursery bed, over 95% survived and these were later transplanted onto a reef at Phi Phi Islands, Thailand that had been devastated by the 2004 Indian Ocean Tsunami. This was successful and showed that damaged reefs can be regenerated with the help of fast-growing corals.
