= Acropora rongelapensis =

Conservation status
- Endangered (IUCN 3.1)

Scientific classification
- Kingdom: Animalia
- Phylum: Cnidaria
- Subphylum: Anthozoa
- Class: Hexacorallia
- Order: Scleractinia
- Family: Acroporidae
- Genus: Acropora
- Species: A. rongelapensis

Binomial name
- Acropora rongelapensis Richards & Wallace, 2004

Species of coral

Acropora rongelapensis is a species of branching scleractinian corals. It is only known from the lagoon of Rongelap Atoll in the Marshall Islands, Pacific Ocean.

This coral forms colonies up to 20 cm across with main branches up to 10 cm long. It is pale brown in colour but appears white in strong light due to the dense skeleton. The main distinguishing feature from its congeners is the laterally flattened branches. It occurs at depths of 28–32 m.
