= Acropora dendrum =

Conservation status
- Endangered (IUCN 3.1)

Scientific classification
- Kingdom: Animalia
- Phylum: Cnidaria
- Subphylum: Anthozoa
- Class: Hexacorallia
- Order: Scleractinia
- Family: Acroporidae
- Genus: Acropora
- Species: A. dendrum

Binomial name
- Acropora dendrum (Bassett-Smith, 1890)

Synonyms
- Madrepora dendrum Bassett-Smith, 1890

Species of coral

Acropora dendrum is a species of acroporid coral that was first described by Bassett-Smith in 1890. Found in tropical, shallow reefs in areas of powerful waves at depths of 5 to 20 m (16 to 66 ft), it is threatened by disease. The species is rated as endangered on the IUCN Red List, with a decreasing population. It is not common but found over a large area, and is listed on CITES Appendix II.

== Description ==
Acropora dendrum occurs in corymbose structures which are 0.5 to 1 m (1.6 to 3.3 ft) wide, which become narrow at the ends and the corals have large gaps between other corals. The radial corallites are almost submerged into the branches, making them feel smooth. It has small axial corallites on the end of each branchlet. Its axial corallites have diameters of 1.4 to 2.2 millimetres (0.055 to 0.087 in) (outer) and 0.5 to 1.2 millimetres (0.020 to 0.047 in) (inner), and the branches can reach 30 millimetres (1.2 in) in length. It is cream of pale brown in colour, there are no similar-looking species, and it is rare. It is found in tropical, shallow reefs in areas that are exposed to powerful waves, and on the slopes of reefs, at depths of 5 to 20 m (16 to 66 ft), and it reaches maturity at over eight years.

== Distribution ==
Acropora dendrum is found over a large area but is not common; the East China Sea, the Indian Ocean, the Indo-Pacific, Southeast Asia, Australia, Japan, Vanuatu, Samoa, and Tonga. It is found at temperatures of around 22.22 °C (72.00 °F), at a silicate concentration of 2.74 micromoles per litre, a nitrate concentration of 0.35 micromoles per litre, and at a salinity of 35.51 PSU. The species threatened by the global reduction of coral reefs, the increase of temperature causing bleaching, disease, coral harvesting, climate change, fishing, human development, pollution, and being prey to starfish Acanthaster planci. It is sometimes found in Marine Protected Areas. It is listed as an endangered species on the IUCN Red List as the population is decreasing, and is listed under Appendix II of CITES.

== Taxonomy ==
It was first described by P.W. Bassett-Smith in 1890 in the South China Sea as Acropora dendrum.
