= Acropora piedmontensis =

Acropora piedmontensis Temporal range: Burdigalian

Scientific classification
- Domain: Eukaryota
- Kingdom: Animalia
- Phylum: Cnidaria
- Class: Hexacorallia
- Order: Scleractinia
- Family: Acroporidae
- Genus: Acropora
- Species: †A. piedmontensis

Binomial name
- †Acropora piedmontensis Wallace & Bosselini, 2015

Extinct species of cnidarians

Acropora piedmontensis is an extinct species of stony coral within the family Acroporidae. The species was described from Piedmont, Italy, east of the city Turin, where it was found to have lived in the Burdigalian age in the early Miocene, 20.44 to 15.97 MYA.
