= Acropora elegans =

Conservation status
- Least Concern (IUCN 3.1)

Scientific classification
- Kingdom: Animalia
- Phylum: Cnidaria
- Subphylum: Anthozoa
- Class: Hexacorallia
- Order: Scleractinia
- Family: Acroporidae
- Genus: Acropora
- Species: A. elegans

Binomial name
- Acropora elegans (Milne Edwards, 1860)

Synonyms
- Acropora magnifica Nemenzo, 1971; Madrepora elegans Milne Edwards, 1860

Species of coral

Acropora elegans is a species of acroporid coral that was first described by Henri Milne-Edwards in 1860. Found in sheltered, sloping reefs, this species occurs at 30 to 60 m (98 to 197 ft) depth. The species is listed as least concern on the IUCN Red List, and has a decreasing population. It is not common and has a small range, and is listed under CITES Appendix II. It is more resistant to disease than other Acropora species.

== Description ==
Acropora elegans is found on flat colonies that are over 1 m (3.3 ft) wide, which are composed of flat branches coming off the centre of the structures. Branches grow to lengths of up to 40 millimetres (1.6 in) long and 10 millimetres (0.39 in) wide. Branchlets are present on the surface of the structure and reach lengths of 20 millimetres (0.79 in). The branch and branchlet ends are pale in colour, while the coral is generally tan-coloured. The radial corallites exist on the sides of most branches, but do mostly not exist below the structure. These are tube-shaped and long, and are combined with the axial corallites. It looks similar to Acropora simplex. It occurs on the steep slopes of sheltered reefs, at depths of between 30 and 60 m (98 and 197 ft).

== Distribution ==
Acropora elegans is not common and occurs in a small range; the Indo-Pacific. It is found in Ryukyu, Papua New Guinea, Milne Bay, the Philippines, and two regions of Indonesia. It is native to Australia, Japan, Indonesia, the Philippines, Papua New Guinea, and Taiwan. There is no exact population for the species, but numbers are known to be decreasing. Unlike other Acropora species, given that this occurs in deep water, it potentially is not as threatened by disease and bleaching from rising sea temperatures than other species in the genus. Despite this, it is threatened by being prey to starfish Acanthaster planci, coral harvesting, climate change, disease, coral bleaching, fishing, and human activity. This species is listed as least concern on the IUCN Red List, and is also listed under CITES Appendix II.

== Taxonomy ==
It was first described by Milne Edwards and Haime in 1860 as Madrepora elegans, and was later identified as a synonym of Acropora magnifica by Nemenzo in 1971. However, it was later re-classified as a separate species, Acropora elegans.
