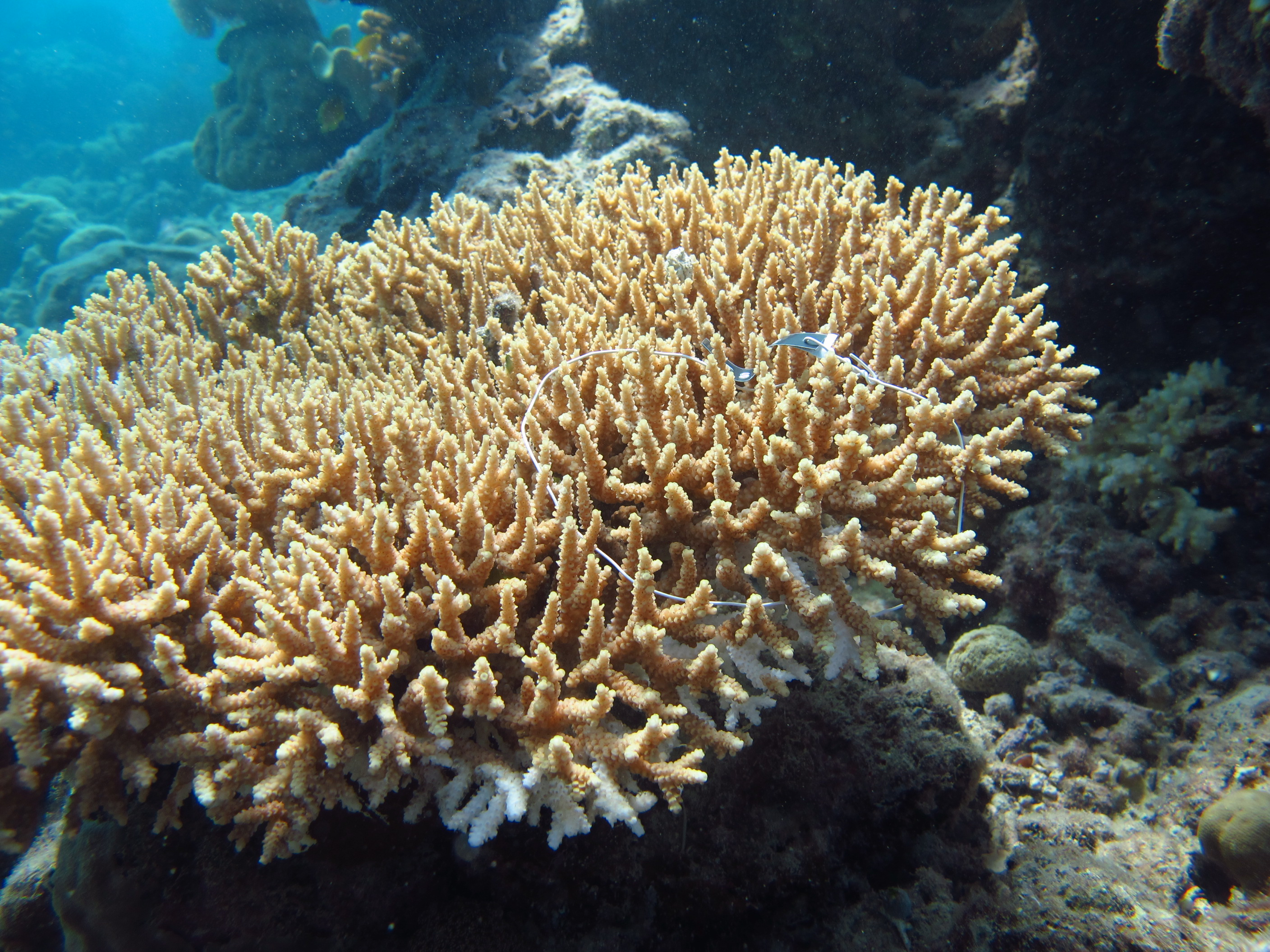

Conservation status
- Endangered (IUCN 3.1)

Scientific classification
- Kingdom: Animalia
- Phylum: Cnidaria
- Subphylum: Anthozoa
- Class: Hexacorallia
- Order: Scleractinia
- Family: Acroporidae
- Genus: Acropora
- Species: A. donei

Binomial name
- Acropora donei Veron & Wallace, 1984

Synonyms
- Acropora akajimensis Veron, 1990

= Acropora donei =

Species of coral

Acropora donei is a species of acroporid coral that was first described by J. Veron and Carden Wallace in 1984. Found in fringing reefs and the upper slopes of shallow reefs, it occurs at depths of 5 to 20 m (16 to 66 ft). The species is rated as endangered on the IUCN Red List, with a decreasing population, and is affected by disease. It is not common but found over a large area, and is listed under CITES Appendix II.

== Description ==
Acropora donei forms in colonies with a width of up to 2 m (6.6 ft), and are made of many fused branches. It is cream, white, green, and sometimes pale brown in colour. The branches are flat, but towards the centre, the ends are upward-facing. The ends of all branches are blunt but neat, and flaring lips are present on larger radial corallites (on the sides of branches), while the smaller corallites lack these. Its coenosteum is bristly, making the species appear rough, and there are no similar species within genus Acropora. It occurs in tropical, shallow reefs; typically in fringing reefs and the slopes of other reefs, where many Acropora species occur. In this marine environment, it exists at between 5 and 20 m (16 and 66 ft).

== Distribution ==
Acropora donei is not common but found over a large range; the Indian Ocean, Australia, western Pacific, Southeast Asia, the Indo-Pacific, Yemen, and Japan. It is found in all six regions of Indonesia and at the Marshall Islands in seven locations, and also occurs in large number of countries. There is no known population for it, but the species is threatened by the decline of coral reefs, water temperatures increasing causing bleaching, disease, climate change, fishing, the acidification of oceans, pollution, invasive species, and Acanthaster planci. It occurs at temperatures of 25.48 to 27.43 °C (77.86 to 81.37 °F), and is thought to have existed for 0.13 million years. The range of some specimens potentially means that they could exist in Marine Protected Areas, and it listed as an endangered species on the IUCN Red List as the population is decreasing, and is listed on CITES under Appendix II.

== Taxonomy ==
It was first described in 1984 by Jen Veron and C. C. Wallace as Acropora donei in East Australia.
