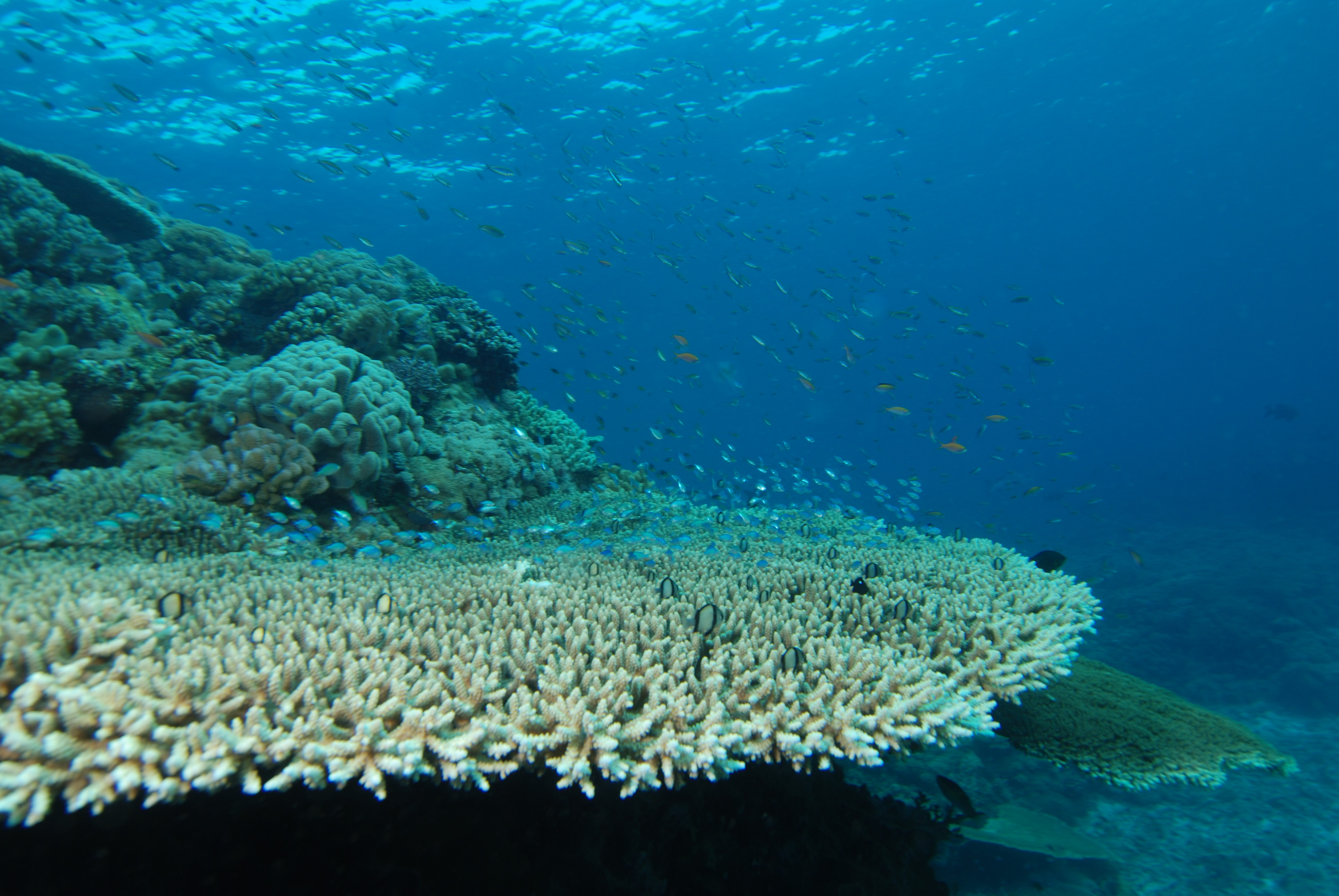
- Acropora pulchra

Scientific classification
- Kingdom: Animalia
- Phylum: Cnidaria
- Subphylum: Anthozoa
- Class: Hexacorallia
- Order: Scleractinia
- Family: Acroporidae
- Genus: Acropora; Oken, 1815

Species
- See text

Synonyms
- List: Heteropora Ehrenberg, 1834; Madrepora (Conocyathus) Brook, 1893; Madrepora (Distichocyathus) Brook, 1893; Madrepora (Eumadrepora) Brook, 1893; Madrepora (Lepidocyathus) Brook, 1893; Madrepora (Odonthocyathus) Brook, 1893; Madrepora (Polystachys) Brook, 1893; Madrepora (Rhabdocyathus) Brook, 1893; Madrepora (Trachylopora) Brook, 1893; Madrepora (Tylopora) Brook, 1893

= Acropora =

Acropora Temporal range: Late Paleocene - recent

Genus of stony coral

Acropora is a genus of small polyp stony coral in the phylum Cnidaria. Some of its species are known as table coral, elkhorn coral, and staghorn coral. Over 149 species are described. Acropora species are some of the major reef corals responsible for building the immense calcium carbonate substructure that supports the thin living skin of a reef.

== Anatomy and distribution ==
Flight through a μCT image stack of an Acropora coral from three views; the "arms" are mostly hollow. This coral had been hot glued onto a stone and later grew over it.

Depending on the species and location, Acropora species may grow as plates or slender or broad branches. Like other corals, Acropora corals are colonies of individual polyps, which are about 2 mm across and share tissue and a nerve net. The polyps can withdraw back into the coral in response to movement or disturbance by potential predators, but when undisturbed, they protrude slightly. The polyps typically extend further at night to help capture plankton and organic matter from the water.

The species are distributed in the Indo-Pacific (over 100 species) and Caribbean (3 species). However, the true number of species is unknown: firstly, the validity of many of these species is questioned as some have been shown to represent hybrids, for example Acropora prolifera; and secondly, some species have been shown to represent cryptic species complexes.

== Threats ==
Flight around a three-dimensional object created from the data above

Symbiodinium, symbiotic algae, live in the corals' cells and produce energy for the animals through photosynthesis. Environmental destruction has led to a dwindling of populations of Acropora, along with other coral species. Acropora is especially susceptible to bleaching when stressed. Bleaching is due to the loss of the coral's zooxanthellae, which are a golden-brown color. Bleached corals are stark white and may die if new Symbiodinium cells cannot be assimilated. Common causes of bleaching and coral death include pollution, abnormally warm water temperatures, increased ocean acidification, sedimentation, and eutrophication.

In 2014 the U.S. Fish and Wildlife Service listed ten Acropora species as 'threatened'.

== Reef-keeping ==
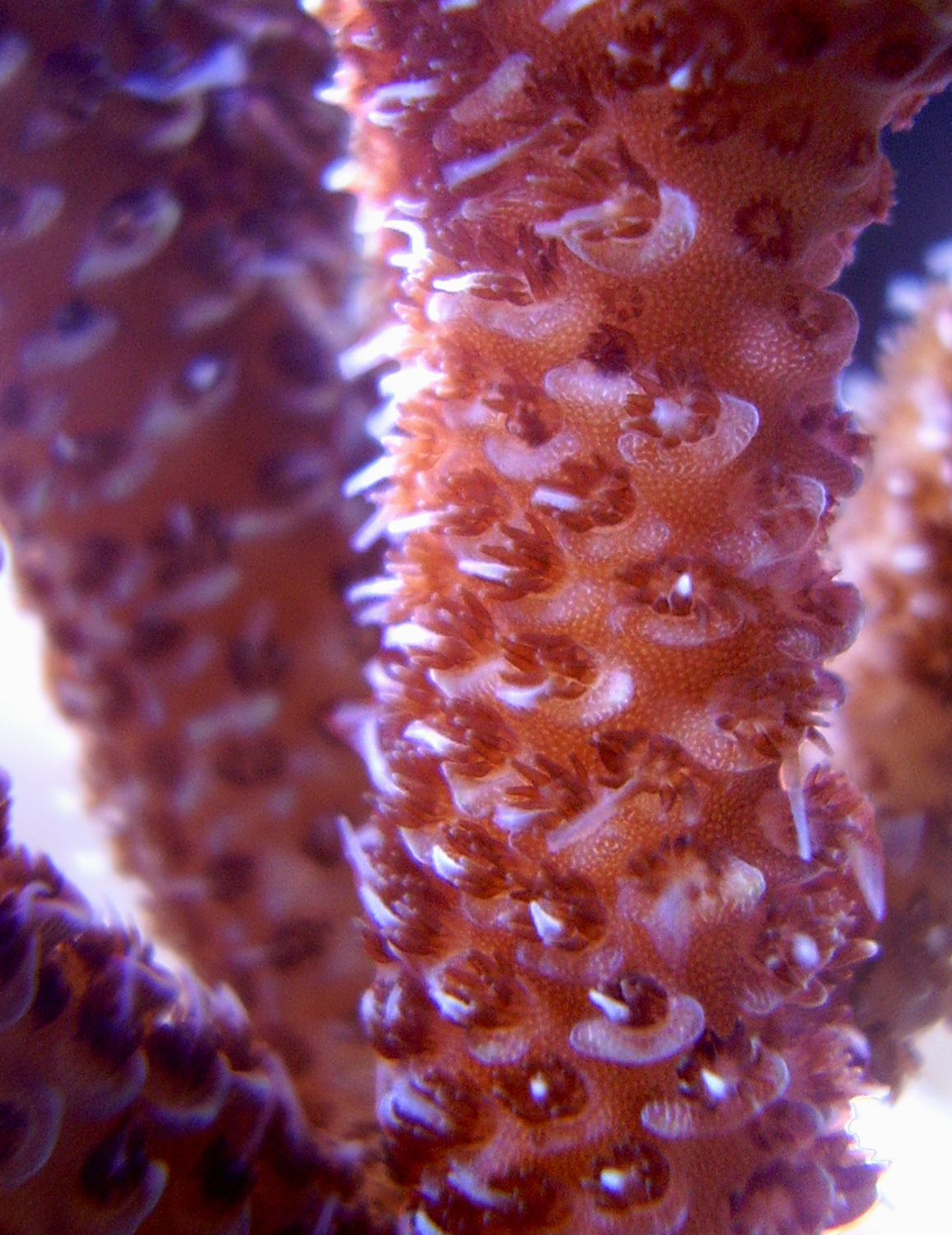
Close-up of a network of Acropora polyps

Most Acropora species are brown or green, but a few are brightly colored, and those rare corals are prized by aquarists. Captive propagation of Acropora is widespread in the reef-keeping community. Given the right conditions, many Acropora species grow quickly, and individual colonies can exceed a meter across in the wild. In a well-maintained reef aquarium, finger-sized fragments can grow into medicine ball-sized colonies in one to two years. Captive specimens are steadily undergoing changes due to selection which enable them to thrive in the home aquarium. In some cases, fragments of captive specimens are used to repopulate barren reefs in the wild.

Acropora species are challenging to keep in a home aquarium. They require bright light, stable temperatures, regular addition of calcium and alkalinity supplements, and clean, turbulent water.

Common parasites of colonies in reef aquariums are "Acropora-eating flatworms" Amakusaplana acroporae, and "red bugs" (Tegastes acroporanus).

== Species ==
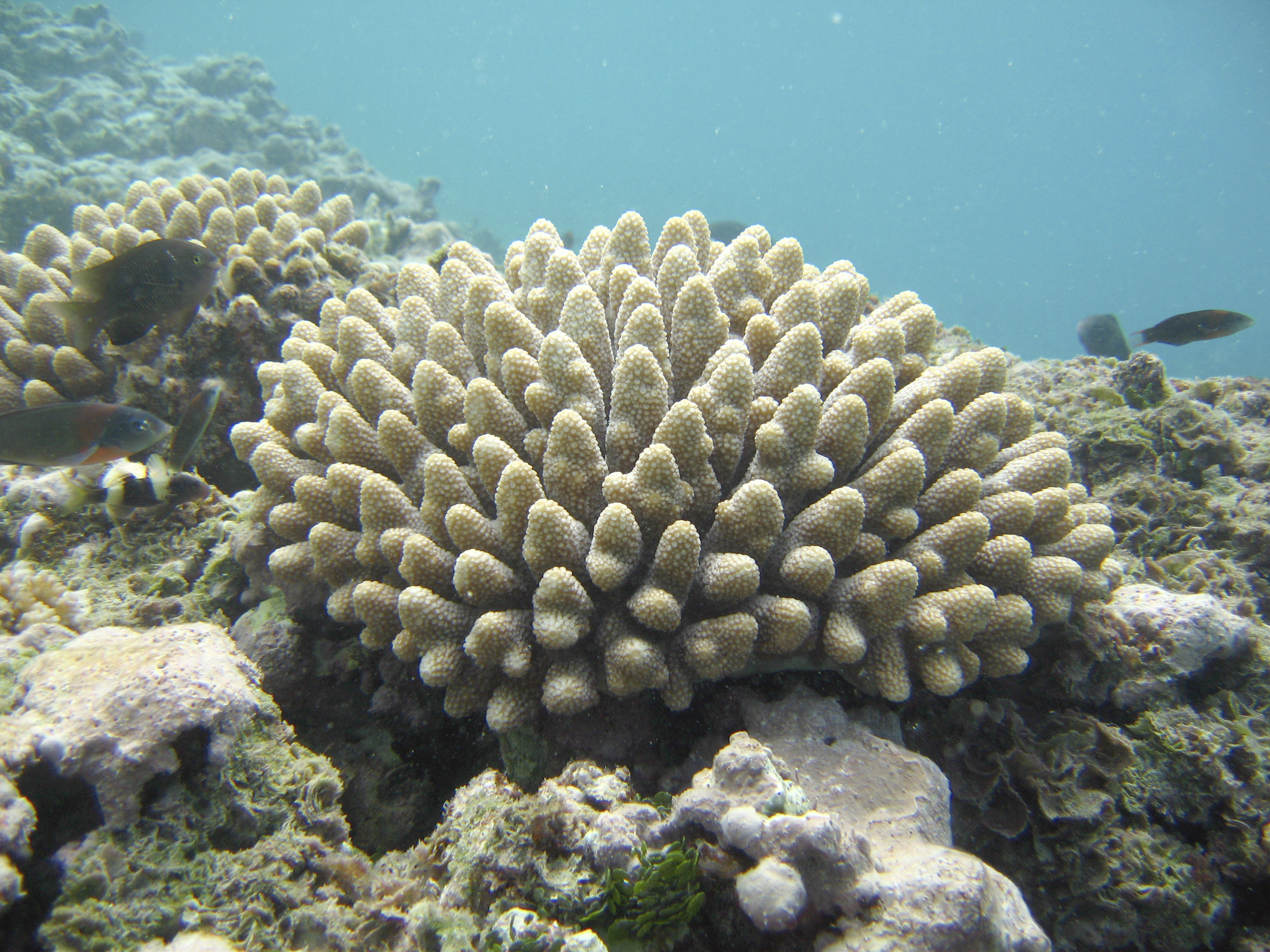
Acropora (Acroporidae) at French Frigate Shoals, northwestern Hawaiian Islands

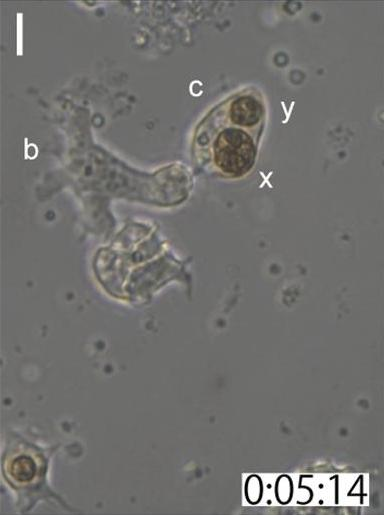
A. tenuis cells of the IVB5 line and symbiosis with photosynthetic dinoflagellate Breviolum minutum (Suessiales) — in vitro: Symbiotic interactions of coral cells (b and c) and dinoflagellates (x and y). Coral cell b interacted with symbiont x, but did not incorporate it, whereas coral cell c endocytosed both x and y.

The following species are recognised in the genus Acropora:

- Acropora abrolhosensis Veron, 1985
- Acropora abrotanoides (Lamarck, 1816)
- Acropora acervata (Dana, 1846)
- Acropora aculeus (Dana, 1846)
- Acropora acuminata (Verrill, 1864)
- Acropora alvarezi† Wallace, 2008
- Acropora anglica† (Duncan, 1866)
- Acropora anthocercis (Brook, 1893)
- Acropora arabensis Hodgson and Carpenter, 1995
- Acropora arafura Wallace, Done & Muir, 2012
- Acropora aspera (Dana, 1846)
- Acropora austera (Dana, 1846)
- Acropora awi Wallace and Wolstenholme, 1998
- Acropora bartonensis† Wallace, 2008
- Acropora batunai Wallace, 1997
- Acropora borneoensis† (Felix, 1921)
- Acropora branchi Riegl, 1995
- Acropora britannica† Wallace, 2008
- Acropora bushyensis Veron and Wallace, 1984
- Acropora capillaris (Klunzinger, 1879)
- Acropora cardenae Wells, 1986
- Acropora carduus (Dana, 1846)
- Acropora caroliniana Nemenzo, 1976
- Acropora cerealis (Dana, 1846)
- Acropora cervicornis (Lamarck, 1816) - staghorn coral
- Acropora chesterfieldensis Veron and Wallace, 1984
- Acropora clathrata (Brook, 1891)
- Acropora cytherea (Dana, 1846)
- Acropora darrellae† Santodomingo, Wallace & Johnson, 2015
- Acropora deformis† (Michelin, 1840)
- Acropora dendrum (Bassett-Smith, 1890)
- Acropora derawaensis Wallace, 1997
- Acropora desalwii Wallace, 1994
- Acropora digitifera (Dana, 1846)
- Acropora divaricata (Dana, 1846)
- Acropora donei Veron and Wallace, 1984
- Acropora downingi Wallace, 1999
- Acropora duncani† (Reuss, 1866)
- Acropora echinata (Dana, 1846)
- Acropora elegans (Milne-Edwards and Haime, 1860)
- Acropora elenae† Santodomingo, Wallace & Johnson, 2015
- Acropora elseyi (Brook, 1892)
- Acropora emanuelae† Santodomingo, Wallace & Johnson, 2015
- Acropora eurystoma (Klunzinger, 1879)
- Acropora fastigata Nemenzo, 1967
- Acropora fennemai† (Gerth, 1921)
- Acropora fenneri Veron, 2000
- Acropora filiformis Veron, 2000
- Acropora florida (Dana, 1846)
- Acropora gemmifera (Brook, 1892)
- Acropora glauca (Brook, 1893)
- Acropora globiceps (Dana, 1846)
- Acropora gomezi Veron, 2000
- Acropora grandis (Brook, 1892)
- Acropora granulosa (Milne-Edwards and Haime, 1860)
- Acropora haidingeri† (Reuss, 1864)
- Acropora halmaherae Wallace and Wolstenholme, 1998
- Acropora hasibuani† Santodomingo, Wallace & Johnson, 2015
- Acropora hemprichii (Ehrenberg, 1834)
- Acropora herklotsi† (Reuss, 1866)
- Acropora hoeksemai Wallace, 1997
- Acropora horrida (Dana, 1846)
- Acropora humilis (Dana, 1846)
- Acropora hyacinthus (Dana, 1846)
- Acropora indonesia Wallace, 1997
- Acropora intermedia (Brook, 1891)
- Acropora jacquelineae Wallace, 1994
- Acropora japonica Veron, 2000
- Acropora kimbeensis Wallace, 1999
- Acropora kirstyae Veron and Wallace, 1984
- Acropora kosurini Wallace, 1994
- Acropora lamarcki Veron, 2000
- Acropora latistella (Brook, 1892)
- Acropora laurae† Santodomingo, Wallace & Johnson, 2015
- Acropora lavandulina† (Michelin, 1840)
- Acropora listeri (Brook, 1893)
- Acropora loisetteae Wallace, 1994
- Acropora lokani Wallace, 1994
- Acropora longicyathus (Milne-Edwards and Haime, 1860)
- Acropora loripes (Brook, 1892)
- Acropora lovelli Veron and Wallace, 1984
- Acropora lutkeni Crossland, 1952
- Acropora macrocalyx† Wallace & Bosselini, 2015
- Acropora microclados (Ehrenberg, 1834)
- Acropora microphthalma (Verrill, 1869)
- Acropora millepora (Ehrenberg, 1834)
- Acropora monticulosa (Brueggemann, 1879)
- Acropora mossambica Riegl, 1995
- Acropora multiacuta Nemenzo, 1967
- Acropora muricata (Linnaeus, 1758)
- Acropora nana (Studer, 1878)
- Acropora nasuta (Dana, 1846)
- Acropora natalensis Riegl, 1995
- Acropora ornata† (DeFrance, 1828)
- Acropora palmata (Lamarck, 1816) - elkhorn coral
- Acropora palmerae Wells, 1954
- Acropora paniculata Verrill, 1902
- Acropora papillare Latypov, 1992
- Acropora pectinata Veron, 2000
- Acropora pharaonis (Milne-Edwards and Haime, 1860)
- Acropora pichoni Wallace, 1999
- Acropora piedmontensis† Wallace & Bosselini, 2015
- Acropora plumosa Wallace and Wolstenholme, 1998
- Acropora polystoma (Brook, 1891)
- Acropora prolifera (Lamarck, 1816) - fused staghorn coral
- Acropora proteacea† Wallace, 2008
- Acropora proximalis Veron, 2000
- Acropora pulchra (Brook, 1891)
- Acropora renemai† Santodomingo, Wallace & Johnson, 2015
- Acropora retusa (Dana, 1846)
- Acropora ridzwani Ditlev, 2003
- Acropora robusta (Dana, 1846)
- Acropora roemeri† (Duncan, 1866)
- Acropora rongelapensis Richards & Wallace, 2004
- Acropora roseni Wallace, 1999
- Acropora rudis (Rehberg, 1892)
- Acropora rufa Veron, 2000
- Acropora russelli Wallace, 1994
- Acropora salentina† Wallace & Bosselini, 2015
- Acropora samoensis (Brook, 1891)
- Acropora sarmentosa (Brook, 1892)
- Acropora secale (Studer, 1878)
- Acropora selago (Studer, 1878)
- Acropora seriata (Ehrenberg, 1834)
- Acropora serrata Lamarck
- Acropora simplex Wallace and Wolstenholme, 1998
- Acropora sirikitiae Wallace, Phongsuwan & Muir, 2012
- Acropora slovenica† Wallace & Bosselini, 2015
- Acropora solanderi† (Defrance, 1828)
- Acropora solitaryensis Veron and Wallace, 1984
- Acropora sordiensis Riegl, 1995
- Acropora spathulata (Brook, 1891)
- Acropora speciosa (Quelch, 1886)
- Acropora spicifera (Dana, 1846)
- Acropora squarrosa (Ehrenberg, 1834)
- Acropora striata (Verrill, 1866)
- Acropora subglabra (Brook, 1891)
- Acropora subulata (Dana, 1846)
- Acropora suharsonoi Wallace, 1994
- Acropora sukarnoi Wallace, 1997
- Acropora tanegashimensi -s Veron, 1990
- Acropora tenella (Brook, 1892)
- Acropora tenuis (Dana, 1846)
- Acropora torihalimeda Wallace, 1994
- Acropora tortuosa (Dana, 1846)
- Acropora tuberculosa (Milne Edwards, 1860)
- Acropora turaki Wallace, 1994
- Acropora valenciennesi (Milne-Edwards and Haime, 1860)
- Acropora valida (Dana, 1846)
- Acropora variolosa (Klunzinger, 1879)
- Acropora vaughani Wells, 1954
- Acropora verweyi Veron and Wallace, 1984
- Acropora walindii Wallace, 1999
- Acropora willisae Veron and Wallace, 1984
- Acropora wilsonae† Wallace, 2008
- Acropora yongei Veron and Wallace, 1984
