= Acropora subglabra =

Conservation status
- Endangered (IUCN 3.1)

Scientific classification
- Kingdom: Animalia
- Phylum: Cnidaria
- Subphylum: Anthozoa
- Class: Hexacorallia
- Order: Scleractinia
- Family: Acroporidae
- Genus: Acropora
- Species: A. subglabra

Binomial name
- Acropora subglabra (Brook, 1891)

Synonyms
- Acropora spiniformis Eguchi & Shirai, 1977; Madrepora subglabra Brook, 1891

Species of coral

Acropora subglabra is a species of acroporid coral found in the northern Indian Ocean, the central Indo-Pacific, Australia, Southeast Asia, Japan, the East China Sea and the oceanic west Pacific Ocean. It occurs in tropical shallow reefs, and its range is often restricted to sheltered back reefs containing soft substrates and clear water. It can be found from depths of 5 to 15 metres (16 to 49 ft) and was described by Brook in 1891.

== Taxonomy ==
It was originally described as Madrepora subglabra by Brook in 1891.

== Description ==
It occurs in colonies of thickets containing branches with appearances like bottlebrush. Colonies appear to be bushy due to the irregular division of branches. Its incipient axial and axial corallites taper to a point and are tube-shaped; its appressed radial corallites are short. The species is pale brown in colour and branches can have yellow tips.

== Distribution ==
It is classed as an endangered species on the IUCN Red List, as its population is decreasing in line with the global decline of coral reefs, and it is listed under Appendix II of CITES. Figures of its population are unknown, but is likely to be threatened by the global reduction of coral reefs, the increase of temperature causing coral bleaching, climate change, human activity, the crown-of-thorns starfish (Acanthaster planci) and disease. It occurs in the northern Indian Ocean, the central Indo-Pacific, Australia, Southeast Asia, Japan, the East China Sea and the oceanic western Pacific Ocean. It is found at depths of between 5 and 25 metres (16 and 82 ft) and is found in tropical shallow reefs; its range is often restricted to sheltered back reefs containing soft substrates and clear water.
