= Acropora desalwii =

Conservation status
- Vulnerable (IUCN 3.1)

Scientific classification
- Kingdom: Animalia
- Phylum: Cnidaria
- Subphylum: Anthozoa
- Class: Hexacorallia
- Order: Scleractinia
- Family: Acroporidae
- Genus: Acropora
- Species: A. desalwii

Binomial name
- Acropora desalwii Wallace, 1994

Species of coral

Acropora desalwii is a species of acroporid coral that was first described by Dr Carden Wallace in 1994. Found in sheltered, tropical, shallow reefs, mainly on the slopes, this species is generally found at depths below 15 metres (49 feet), but this can be as low as 30 metres (98 feet). The species is rated as vulnerable on the IUCN Red List, with a decreasing population, and is affected by disease. It is common and found over a large area, and is listed under CITES Appendix II.

== Description ==
Acropora desalwii forms in corymbose colonies consisting of crowded branches. The branchlets at the edge of the corymbose colonies are obvious, upward-facing, and can have over a single axial corallite, which are tube-shaped and long, and facing upwards. It is green, brown or blue in colour, and radial corallites are also present on the sides of the branchlets. It resembles Acropora parapharaonis and Acropora willisae. It exists in a marine environment in tropical, shallow, sheltered reefs, generally at depths less than 15 m (49 ft), but can be found at between 10 and 30 m (33 and 98 ft). It is often kept in aquariums, where it reaches diameters of up to 25 cm.

== Distribution ==
Acropora desalwii is common and found over a large area; the Solomon Islands and the Indo-Pacific, and it mainly occurs in Indonesia (two regions), Pohnpei, and the Philippines. It is native to Micronesia, Thailand, Australia, Malaysia, Indonesia, Papua New Guinea, the Solomon Islands, and Singapore. There is no known population for it, but the species is threatened by the decline of coral reefs, water temperatures increasing causing bleaching, disease, climate change, fishing, the acidification of oceans, pollution, invasive species, and Acanthaster planci. Some specimens could occur within Marine Protected Areas, it listed as a vulnerable species on the IUCN Red List as the population is decreasing, and is listed under Appendix II of CITES.

== Taxonomy ==
It was first described by C. C. Wallace in 1994 in the Indo-Pacific as Acropora desalwii.
