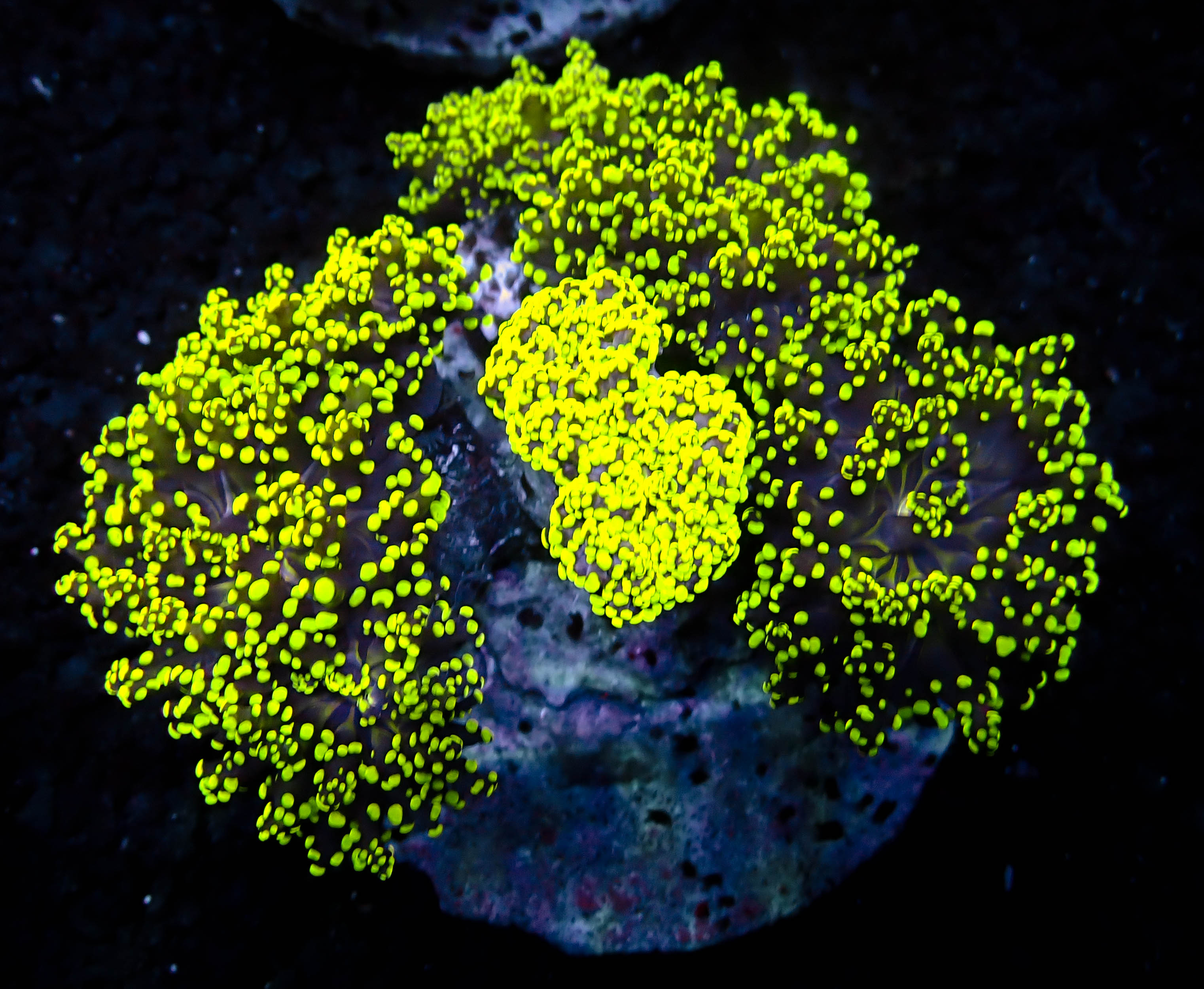

Conservation status
- Least Concern (IUCN 3.1)

Scientific classification
- Kingdom: Animalia
- Phylum: Cnidaria
- Subphylum: Anthozoa
- Class: Hexacorallia
- Order: Scleractinia
- Family: Acroporidae
- Genus: Acropora
- Species: A. microphthalma

Binomial name
- Acropora microphthalma (Verrill, 1859)

Synonyms
- Acropora inermis (Brook, 1891); Madrepora microphthalma Verrill, 1869

= Acropora microphthalma =

Species of coral

Acropora microphthalma is a species of acroporid coral found in the Red Sea, the Gulf of Aden, the southwest and northern Indian Ocean, the central Indo-Pacific, Australia, Southeast Asia, Japan, the East China Sea and the oceanic west and central Pacific Ocean. It is also found in the Line Islands. It occurs in shallow tropical reefs on upper reef slopes, in turbid water and in sandy lagoons. It can be found from depths of 5–25 m.

== Description ==
Colonies of this species are small and arborescent, usually forming thickets. The branches are slender and straight. Its colour is usually pale grey, but it is sometimes pale brown or cream.

== Biology ==
Acropora microphthalma is a zooxanthellate species of coral. It obtains most of its nutritional needs from the symbiotic dinoflagellates that live inside its soft tissues. These photosynthetic organisms provide the coral with organic carbon and nitrogen, sometimes providing up to 90% of their host's energy needs for metabolism and growth. Its remaining needs are met by the planktonic organisms caught by the tentacles of the polyps.

== Status ==
This coral is a common species and no species-specific threats have been identified. The main threats faced by corals in general are related to climate change and the mechanical destruction of their coral reef habitats; increasing damage from extreme weather events, rising sea water temperatures and ocean acidification. The International Union for Conservation of Nature has assessed the conservation status of this species as being "near threatened". All corals receive protection by being listed on CITES Appendix II.
