= Acropora kirstyae =

Conservation status
- Endangered (IUCN 3.1)

Scientific classification
- Kingdom: Animalia
- Phylum: Cnidaria
- Subphylum: Anthozoa
- Class: Hexacorallia
- Order: Scleractinia
- Family: Acroporidae
- Genus: Acropora
- Species: A. kirstyae

Binomial name
- Acropora kirstyae Veron & Wallace, 1984

Species of coral

Acropora kirstyae is a species of acroporid coral that was first described by Jen Veron and C. C. Wallace in 1984. Found in marine, tropical, shallow reefs in sheltered areas usually at depths of 10 to 25 m (33 to 82 ft), and also occurs in sheltered lagoons. It is listed as a vulnerable species on the IUCN Red List, and it is thought to have a decreasing population. It is not common and found over a large area, and is listed on CITES Appendix II.

== Description ==
Acropora kirstyae forms in colonies of branches forming from a central point, and the structure features many thin branches and sub-branches, and incipient axial corallites are present. The branches can reach lengths of around 120 millimetres (4.7 in). The tips of these branches are generally white, and the species is a pale orange-to-brown colour. The radial corallites are tube-shaped, tightly packed, and orderly, however become irregular towards the ends of the branches. At the ends of the branches, flaring lips may be present. It resembles Acropora exquisita. It occurs in marine, tropical, shallow reefs in sheltered water, and in sheltered lagoons. It also exists in sheltered reef slopes, at depths of 10 to 25 m (33 to 82 ft). It reaches maturity at between three and eight. It is composed of aragonite (calcium carbonate).

== Distribution ==
Acropora kirstyae is not common but found over a large range; the Indo-Pacific, the East China Sea, Japan, Eastern Australia, and the west Pacific. It is present in two regions of Indonesia, and also occurs in Papua New Guinea, the Philippines, the Solomon Islands, the Rodrigues, Palau, Raja Ampat, and New Caledonia. It exists in temperatures between 26.13 and 26.56 °C (79.03 and 79.81 °F). There is no specific population data for the species, but overall, it is known to be decreasing. It is affected by bleaching by rising sea temperatures, fishing, coral disease, climate change, pollution, human development, infrastructure, and may be exported. It is listed as a vulnerable species on the IUCN Red List and is listed under CITES Appendix II, and can occur within Marine Protected Areas.

== Taxonomy ==
It was first described by Jen Veron and C. C. Wallace in 1984 as Acropora kirstyae.
