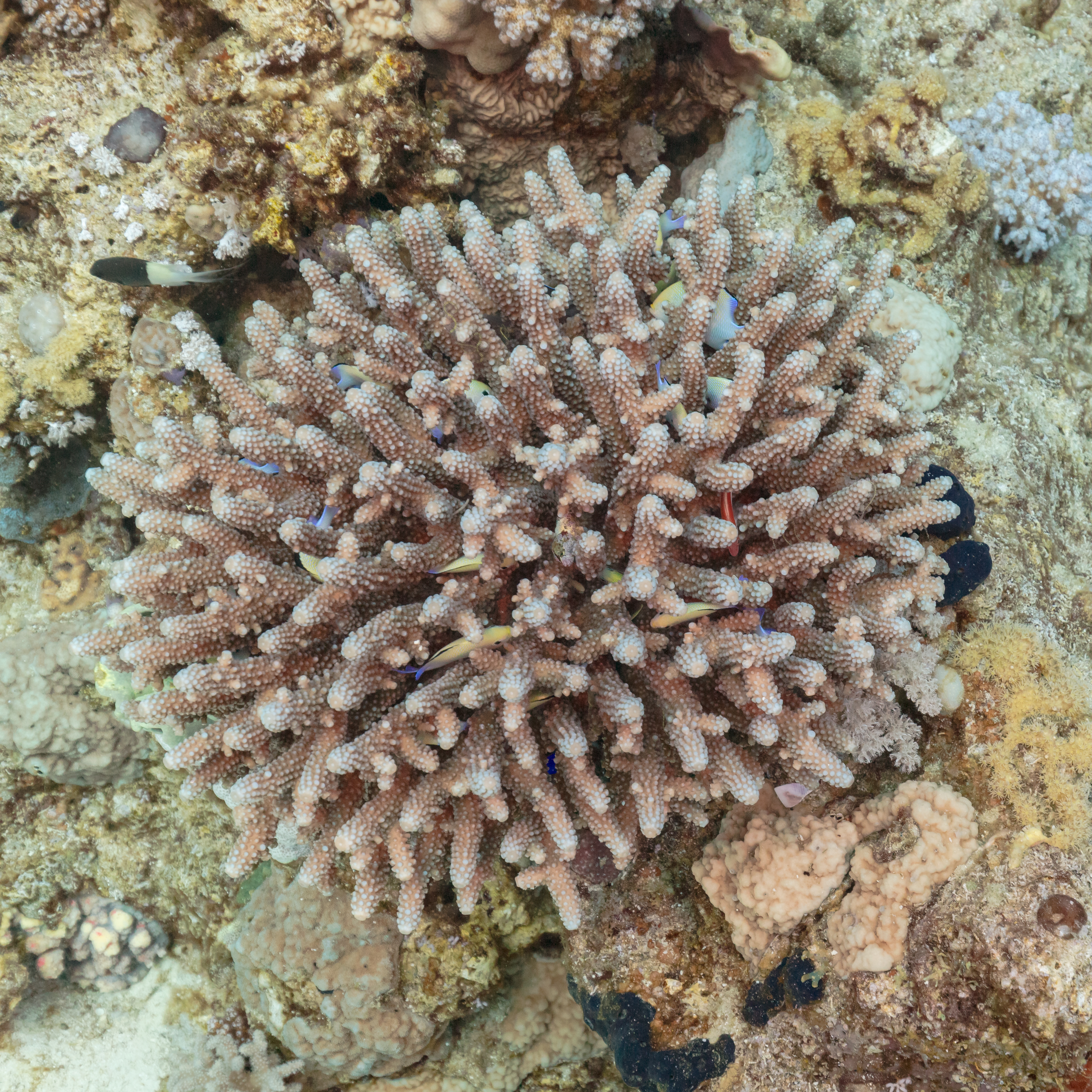

Conservation status
- Endangered (IUCN 3.1)

Scientific classification
- Kingdom: Animalia
- Phylum: Cnidaria
- Subphylum: Anthozoa
- Class: Hexacorallia
- Order: Scleractinia
- Family: Acroporidae
- Genus: Acropora
- Species: A. hemprichii

Binomial name
- Acropora hemprichii (Ehrenberg, 1834)

Synonyms
- Acropora hemprichi (Ehrenberg, 1834) [lapsus]; Heteropora hemprichii Ehrenberg, 1834

= Acropora hemprichii =

Species of coral

Acropora hemprichii is a species of acroporid coral that was first described by Christian Gottfried Ehrenberg in 1834. It lives in reefs at depths of 3 to 15 m (9.8 to 49.2 ft) for between 13 and 24 years. The species is listed as endangered on the IUCN Red List, and has a decreasing population. It is common with a wide range, and is listed on Appendix II of CITES.

== Description ==
Acropora hemprichii lives in colonies of densely-packed branches, which are flat or upward-facing. Branches grow to diameters of between 12 and 30 millimetres (0.47 and 1.18 in) and lengths of around 80 millimetres (3.1 in). These colonies are often more than 2 m (6.6 ft) wide, and can exist without the presence of any other species. The axial corallites are rounded and shaped like domes, and the incipient axial corallites are present on some specimens. The radial corallites are cone-shaped irregularly spaced, have smooth walls, and are large. It has a smooth coenosteum, and the species is mainly brown or pink-brown. It exists in shallow reefs in marine environments, and at depths of 3 to 15 m (9.8 to 49.2 ft). From specimens in the Red Sea, this species has been shown to live for between thirteen and 24 years. It is composed of aragonite.

== Distribution ==
Acropora hemprichii is common but only found in a small area; the Gulf of Aden, the Red Sea, the Philippines, and the Indian Ocean. Despite being affected by bleaching, in the northern areas of the Red Sea, the species has avoided most bleaching, with only 6% of reefs being destroyed over recent decades. However, the species did not survive as well in the southern areas of the Red Sea. The species first existed between 0.78 and 0.13 myr ago. There is no known population for it, but numbers are believed to be decreasing, and the species is affected by disease, bleaching by sea temperature rises, fishing, and human infrastructure, and is prey to Acanthaster planci. It is listed as an endangered species on the IUCN Red List and appears on CITES Appendix II.

== Taxonomy ==
It was first described by Christian Gottfried Ehrenberg in 1834 as Heteropora hemprichii, before being re-classified as Acropora hemprichi.
