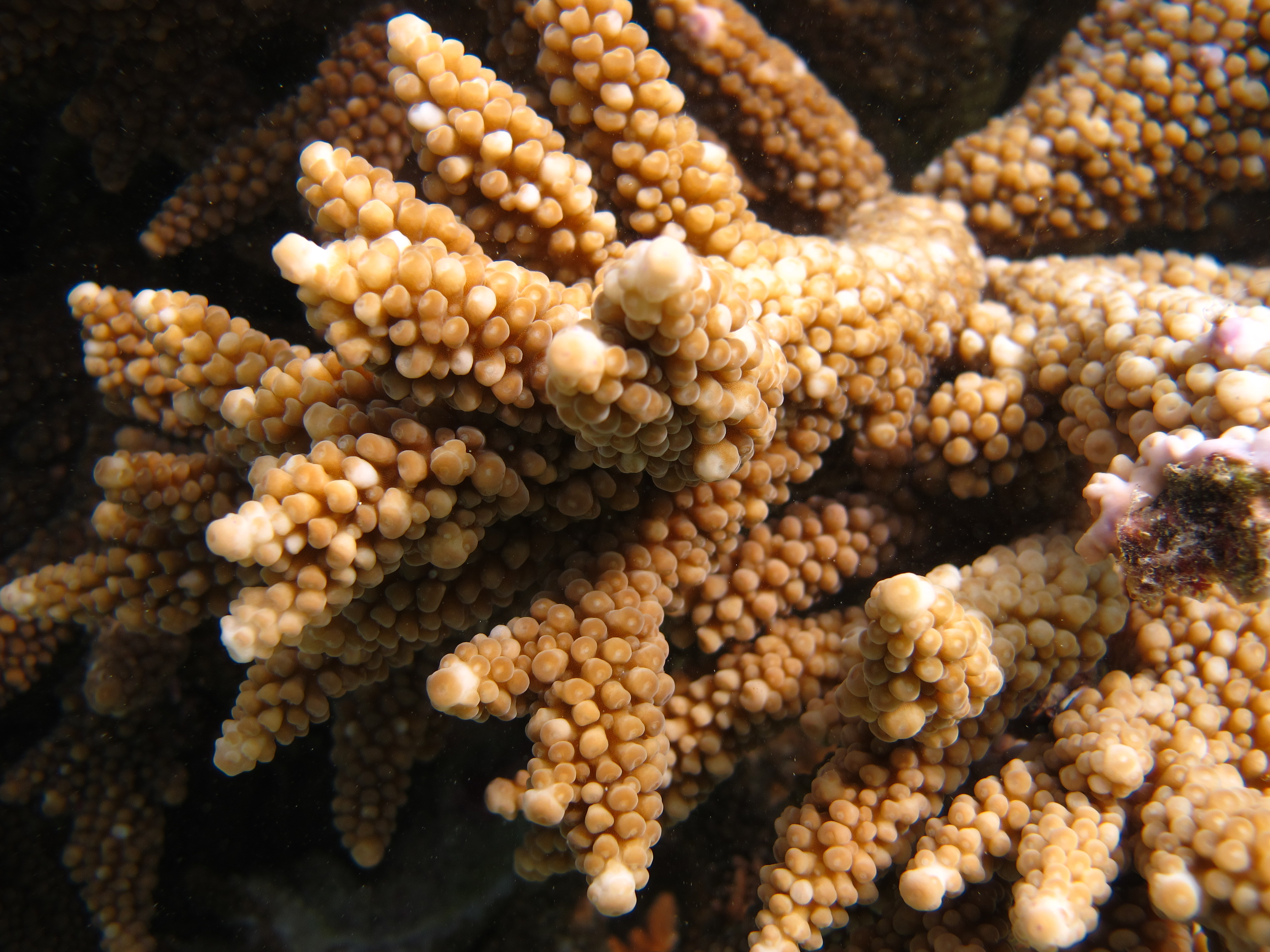

Conservation status
- Near Threatened (IUCN 3.1)

Scientific classification
- Kingdom: Animalia
- Phylum: Cnidaria
- Subphylum: Anthozoa
- Class: Hexacorallia
- Order: Scleractinia
- Family: Acroporidae
- Genus: Acropora
- Species: A. austera

Binomial name
- Acropora austera Dana, 1846

= Acropora austera =

Species of coral

Acropora austera is a species of Acropora coral found in the Indo-Pacific. A. austera are fast-growing that are dispersed in ocean currents.
