= Acropora capillaris =

Conservation status
- Data Deficient (IUCN 3.1)

Scientific classification
- Kingdom: Animalia
- Phylum: Cnidaria
- Subphylum: Anthozoa
- Class: Hexacorallia
- Order: Scleractinia
- Family: Acroporidae
- Genus: Acropora
- Species: A. capillaris

Binomial name
- Acropora capillaris (Klunzinger, 1879)

Species of coral

Acropora capillaris is a species of acroporid coral found in the Red Sea.
