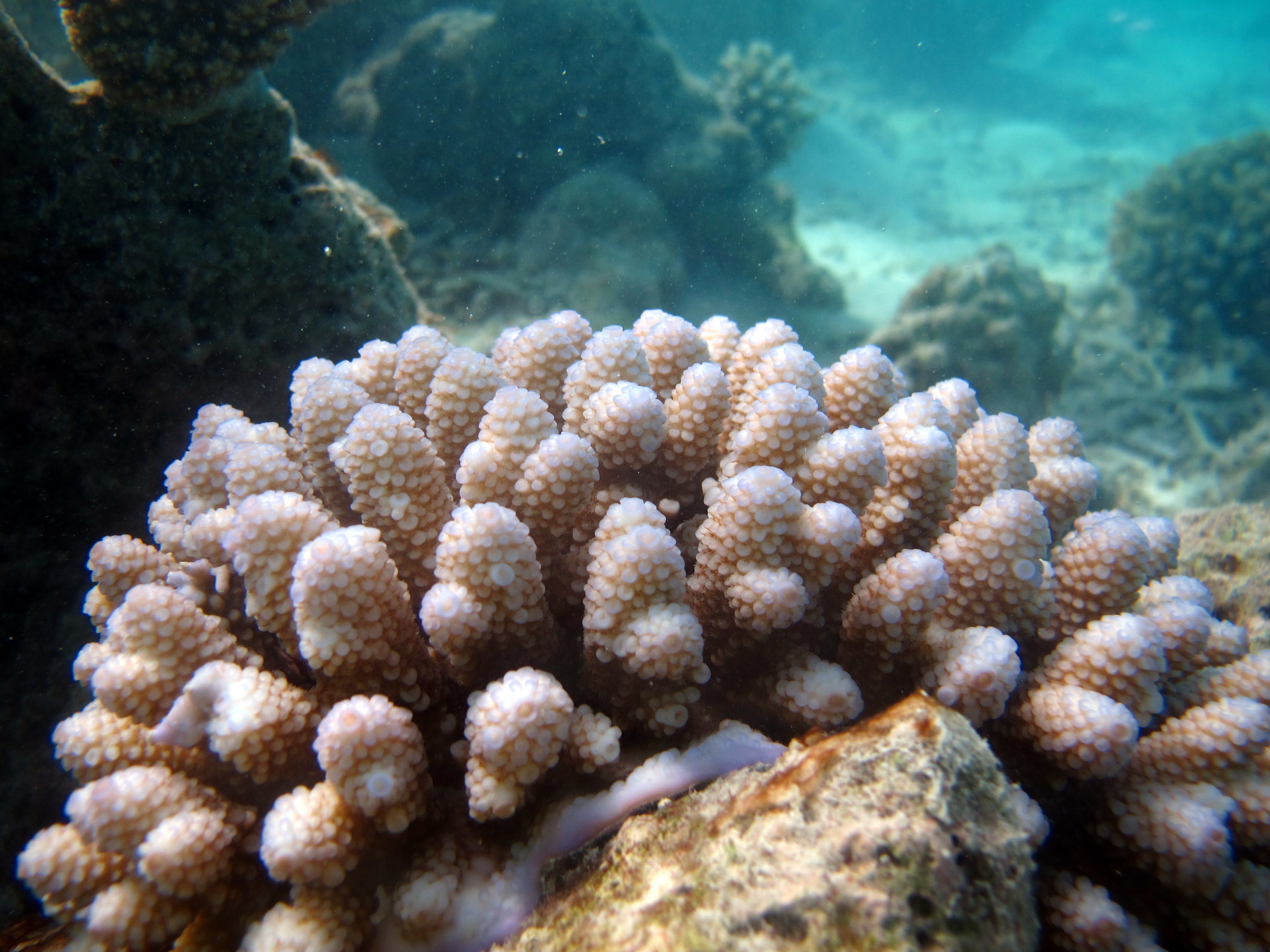

Conservation status
- Endangered (IUCN 3.1)

- Threatened (ESA)

Scientific classification
- Kingdom: Animalia
- Phylum: Cnidaria
- Subphylum: Anthozoa
- Class: Hexacorallia
- Order: Scleractinia
- Family: Acroporidae
- Genus: Acropora
- Species: A. retusa

Binomial name
- Acropora retusa Dana, 1846

= Acropora retusa =

Species of coral

Acropora retusa is a species of Acropora coral found in U.S. waters in Guam, American Samoa, and the Pacific Remote Island Areas Colonies of Acropora retusa are often found in green or brown colors and are made of flat plates with short branches, causing them to appear spikey.
