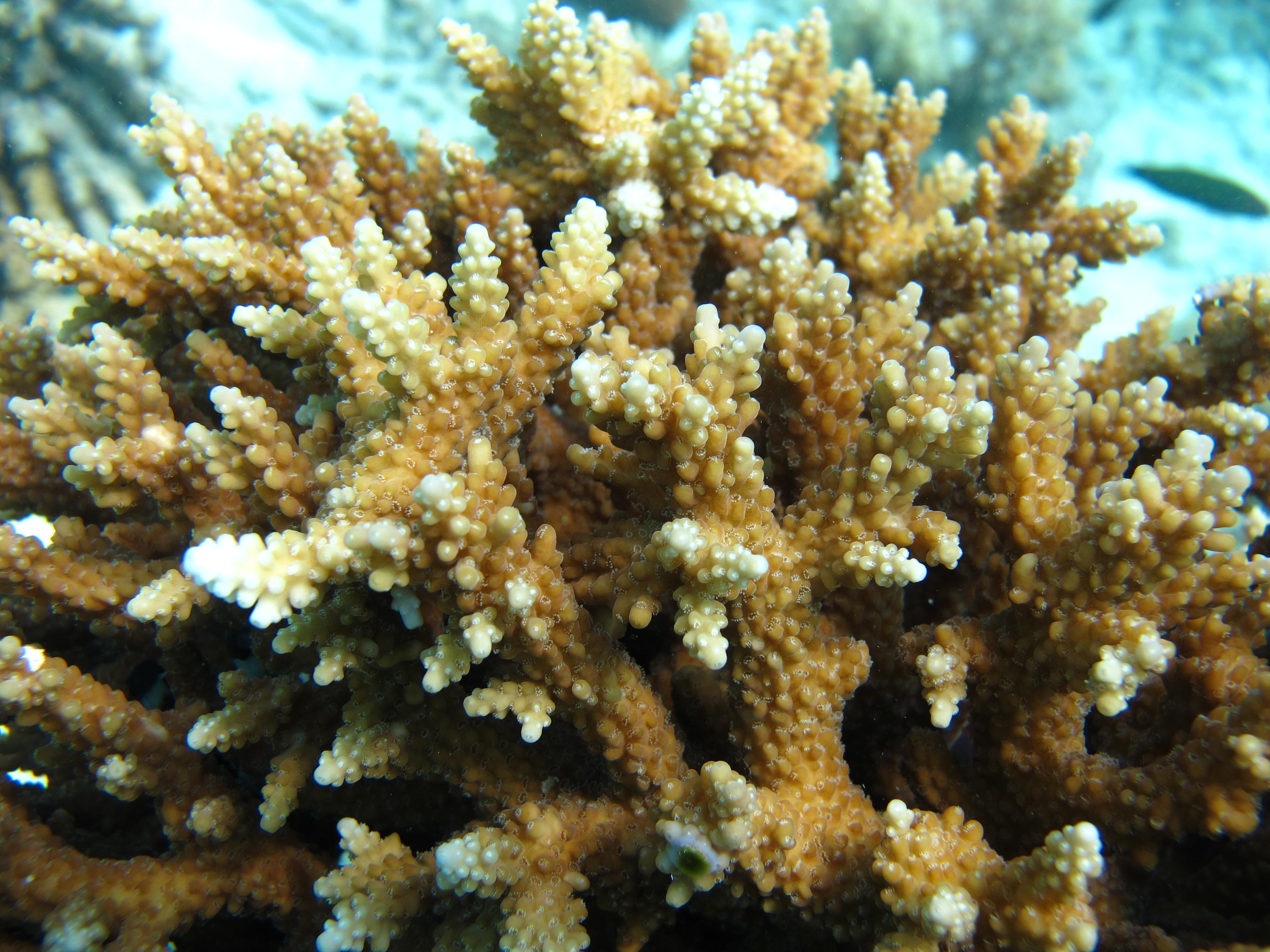

Conservation status
- Endangered (IUCN 3.1)

Scientific classification
- Kingdom: Animalia
- Phylum: Cnidaria
- Subphylum: Anthozoa
- Class: Hexacorallia
- Order: Scleractinia
- Family: Acroporidae
- Genus: Acropora
- Species: A. latistella

Binomial name
- Acropora latistella Brook, 1891

= Acropora latistella =

Species of coral

Acropora latistella is a species of Acropora polyp coral found in tropical reefs in the Indo-Pacific Ocean from depths ranging from 3 – 20 meters.
