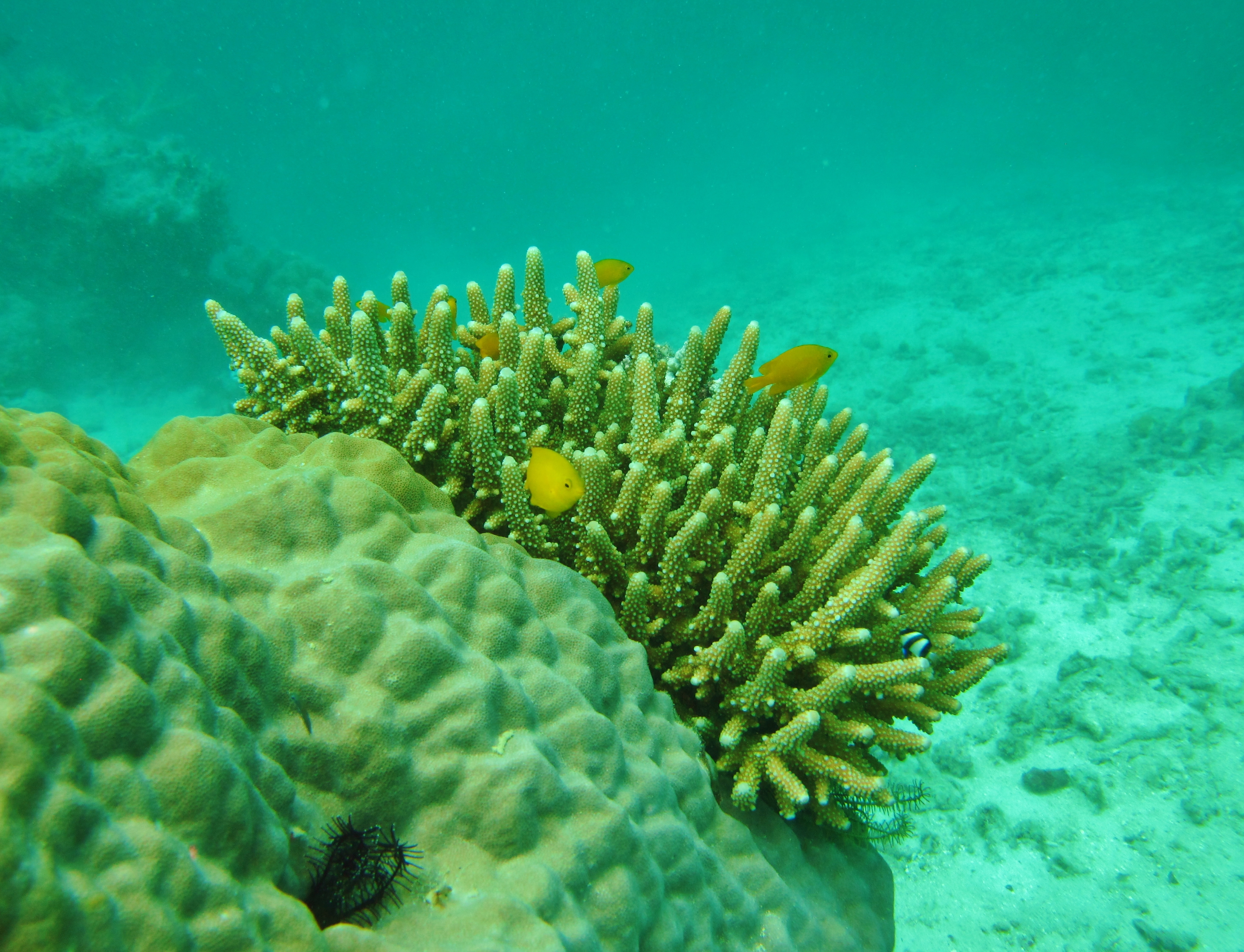

Conservation status
- Least Concern (IUCN 3.1)

Scientific classification
- Kingdom: Animalia
- Phylum: Cnidaria
- Subphylum: Anthozoa
- Class: Hexacorallia
- Order: Scleractinia
- Family: Acroporidae
- Genus: Acropora
- Species: A. samoensis

Binomial name
- Acropora samoensis (Brook, 1891)

Synonyms
- Acropora torresiana Veron, 2000; Acropora wallacea Veron, 1990; Madrepora samoensis Brook, 1891

= Acropora samoensis =

Species of coral

Acropora samoensis is a species of acroporid coral found in the Red Sea, the Gulf of Aden, the southwest and northern Indian Ocean, the central Indo-Pacific, Australia, Southeast Asia, Japan, the East China Sea and the oceanic west and central Pacific Ocean. It occurs in tropical shallow reefs on upper slopes of reefs, from depths of 5 to 15 metres (16 to 49 ft). It was described by Brook in 1891.

== Description ==
It occurs in digitate colonies that are either prostrate or corymbose and have diameters up to 1 metre (3 ft 3 in). Its branches taper slightly towards the ends and are curved. Its axial corallites have diameters at least double the size of its radial corallites and are dome-shaped; its radial corallites are tube-shaped. It is blue, cream, or purple in colour, and looks similar to Acropora torresiana.

== Distribution ==
It is classed as a least concern species on the IUCN Red List, but it is believed that its population is decreasing, and it is listed under Appendix II of CITES. Figures of its population are unknown, but is likely to be threatened by the global reduction of coral reefs, the increase of temperature causing coral bleaching, climate change, human activity, the crown-of-thorns starfish (Acanthaster planci) and disease. It occurs in the Red Sea, the Gulf of Aden, the southwest and northern Indian Ocean, the central Indo-Pacific, Australia, Southeast Asia, Japan, the East China Sea and the oceanic west and central Pacific Ocean. It is found at depths of between 5 and 15 metres (16 and 49 ft) in tropical shallow reefs on upper slopes.

== Taxonomy ==
It was described as Madrepora samoensis by Brook in 1891.
