= Acropora multiacuta =

Conservation status
- Endangered (IUCN 3.1)

Scientific classification
- Kingdom: Animalia
- Phylum: Cnidaria
- Subphylum: Anthozoa
- Class: Hexacorallia
- Order: Scleractinia
- Family: Acroporidae
- Genus: Acropora
- Species: A. multiacuta

Binomial name
- Acropora multiacuta Nemenzo, 1967

Species of coral

Acropora multiacuta is a species of acroporid coral that was first described by F. Nemenzo in 1967. Found in marine, tropical shallow reefs in lagoons, on rocks or on the tops of reefs, it occurs at depths between 3 and 15 m (10 and 49 ft). It is classed as an endangered species on the IUCN Red List, and it has a decreasing population. It is uncommon but found over a large area, including in two regions of Indonesia and the Great Barrier Reef, and is classified under CITES Appendix II.

== Description ==
Acropora multiacuta occurs in dense colonies consisting of many branches, which contain long coral bodies growing in a straight line (axial corallites), decreasing in width towards the end of the branches. Often white or cream in colour, incipient axial corallites occur below the axial corallites, and form branchlets. The species is similar to Acropora fastigata and Acropora suharsonoi. It occurs in a marine environment in tropical, shallow reefs, on rocks, reef walls, lagoon areas exposed to wave action, and may be a dominant species. It occurs at depths of between 3 and 15 m (9.8 and 49.2 ft), and is composed of aragonite (calcium carbonate).

== Distribution ==
Acropora multicuta is found over a large area but is generally rare; the Indian Ocean, the Indo-Pacific, the western Pacific, the Solomon Islands, Southeast Asia, Eastern Australia, Raja Ampat, and Papua New Guinea. In the Great Barrier Reef, this species is common, and also occurs in two regions of Indonesia. It is usually found in groups of colonies. Occurring at a maximum water temperature of 28.52 °C (83.34 °F), the population of the species is decreasing. It is threatened by climate change, rising sea temperatures leading to bleaching, coral disease, reef destruction, being prey to Acanthaster planci, and human activity. It is classed as an endangered species on the IUCN Red List, is listed under CITES Appendix II, and could occur within Marine Protected Areas.

== Taxonomy ==
It was first described by F. Nemenzo in 1967 in the Philippines as Acropora multicuta.
