= Acropora rudis =

Conservation status
- Endangered (IUCN 3.1)

Scientific classification
- Kingdom: Animalia
- Phylum: Cnidaria
- Subphylum: Anthozoa
- Class: Hexacorallia
- Order: Scleractinia
- Family: Acroporidae
- Genus: Acropora
- Species: A. rudis

Binomial name
- Acropora rudis (Rehberg, 1892)

Synonyms
- Madrepora rudis Rehberg, 1892

Species of coral

Acropora rudis is a species of acroporid coral found in the Indo-Pacific region. It is an uncommon species and is classified by the International Union for Conservation of Nature as an endangered species because it is particularly susceptible to coral bleaching, coral diseases, damage by the crown-of-thorns starfish and destruction of its coral reef habitat.

== Description ==
Acropora rudis is a colonial stagshorn coral forming clumps up to a metre (yard) across. The branches are tapering, irregular and robust, up to 40 mm (1.6 in) in diameter; some extend upwards, others are horizontal, and some turn downwards near the tips. The branches are up to 160 mm (6 in) in length. At the ends of the branches, the axial corallites, the stony cups in which the polyps sit, are very large. The radial corallites at the sides of the branches are smaller, close together, rounded and tubular, or tubular-conical. The colour of this coral varies, sometimes being dark green and other times being brown.

== Distribution and habitat ==
Acropora rudis is native to the northern Indian Ocean where it has a patchy distribution in Sri Lanka, the Seychelles, Bangladesh, Thailand and western Sumatra. It occurs on rocky fringing reefs, the edges of shallow reefs and the upper parts of submerged reefs, at depths between about 3 and 15 m (10 and 50 ft).

== Status ==
Corals in the genus Acropora are particularly prone to bleaching and coral disease and when they have been damaged, are slow to recover; they are also affected when the reefs where they grow are destroyed by storms or trawling, and by ocean warming and acidification. Acropora rudis is an uncommon species with a somewhat limited range and habitat destruction is predicted to reduce populations considerably. Because of these threats, the International Union for Conservation of Nature has rated the conservation status of this coral as "endangered".
