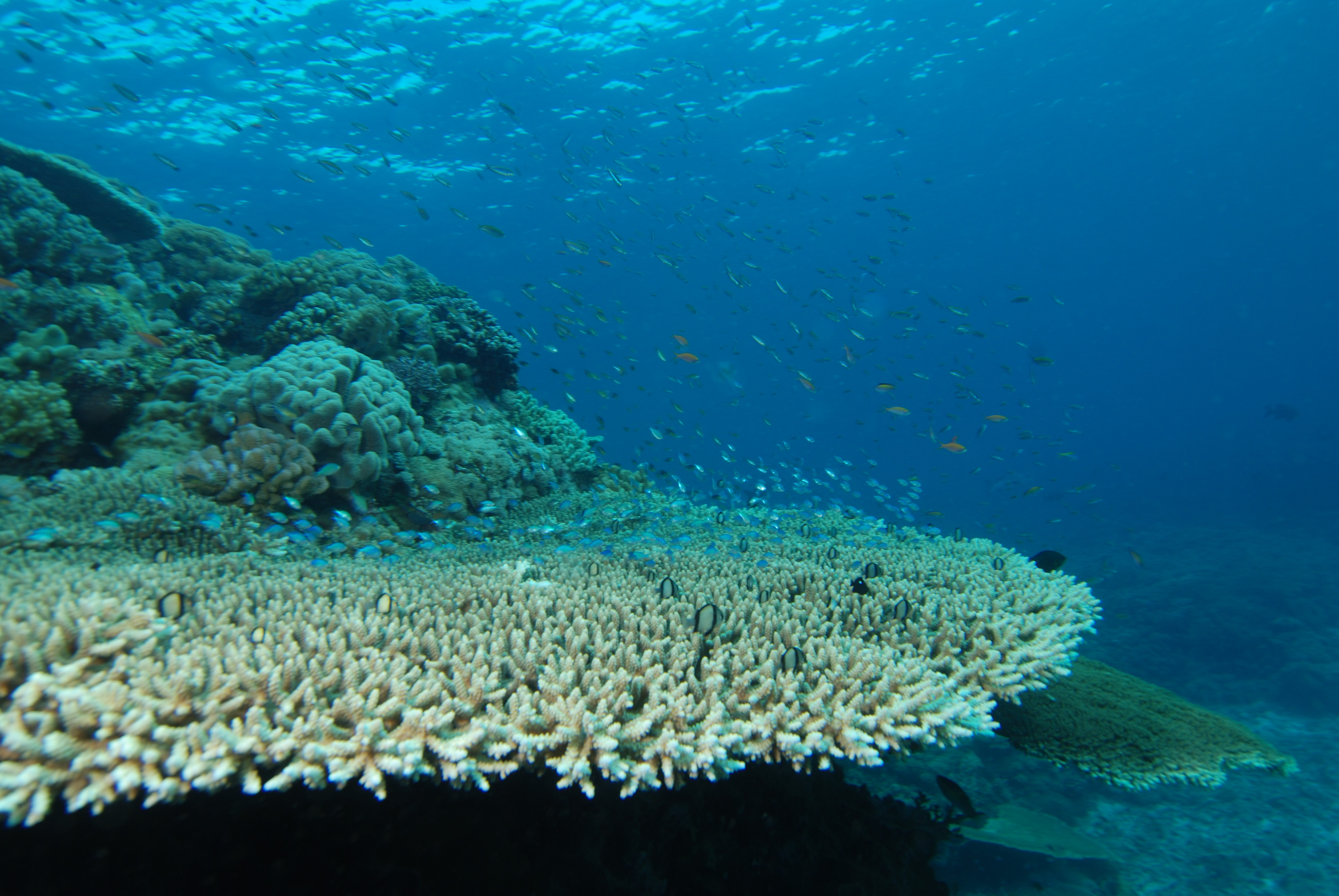

Conservation status
- Endangered (IUCN 3.1)

Scientific classification
- Kingdom: Animalia
- Phylum: Cnidaria
- Subphylum: Anthozoa
- Class: Hexacorallia
- Order: Scleractinia
- Family: Acroporidae
- Genus: Acropora
- Species: A. pulchra

Binomial name
- Acropora pulchra (Brook, 1891)

Synonyms
- Madrepora pulchra Brook, 1891

= Acropora pulchra =

Species of coral

Acropora pulchra is a species of colonial staghorn coral in the family Acroporidae. It is found on the back fringes of reefs in shallow water in the western Indo-Pacific Ocean. The oldest fossils of this species date back to the Pleistocene.

== Description ==
The stony skeleton of Acropora pulchra takes on various forms. It is a branching species, sometimes being tree-like and forming thickets and in other locations forming tangled colonies with level upper surfaces. The branches are up to 12 mm (0.5 in) in diameter and up to 18 cm (7 in) long. Often the whole colony spreads horizontally and is no more than 5 cm (2 in) thick. The growth habit largely depends on where the coral is growing in relation to the tide levels. The polyps protrude from little cup-shaped depressions called corallites which are widely spaced on the branches and which have elongated lower lips. The colour of this coral varies from blue to various shades of brown, often with pale blue tips to the branches.

== Distribution and habitat ==
Acropora pulchra is found in the western Indo-Pacific region, its range extending from the Gulf of Aden to Southeast Asia, Japan, the East China Sea and Australia. It chiefly grows at depths which range from 1 to 20 metres (3 ft 3 in to 65 ft 7 in) on back reef fringes and flats and in reef lagoons, often growing among the closely related coral species Acropora aspera.

== Biology ==
The polyps of Acropora pulchra extend their tentacles to catch plankton. However, much of the nutrition the coral receives comes from the symbiotic zooxanthellae found in the tissues. These photosynthetic dinoflagellates produce energy when exposed to sunlight and the coral makes use of this. Acropora spp. corals are slow-growing and flourish in clear water. They are particularly sensitive to sediment, pollution and algal blooms, which cloud the water and reduce the amount of incoming sunlight. Nor do they like temperatures outside the range 66 °F (19 °C) to 86 °F (30 °C). If the sea gets too hot they may expel the zooxanthellae and this causes bleaching of the coral.

Acropora pulchra synchronizes its reproductive activities with the phase of the moon so that all the corals in one locality spawn on the same couple of days, although the date varies between the northern and southern hemispheres and different parts of the coral's range. It can also reproduce asexually when broken fragments of coral come to rest in positions where they can establish themselves. Experiments have been carried out on the feasibility of transplanting this coral to other suitable habitats where it is not native. These trials were successful but transplants were adversely affected by excess sedimentation and tended to grow more slowly than control corals.

== Status ==
The IUCN Red List of Threatened Species lists Acropora pulchra as being of "endangered" as a result of increased occurrences of coral bleaching due to rising water temperatures. The chief threats it faces are from the general destruction of coral reefs, ocean acidification, raised sea temperatures, and coral diseases. The crown-of-thorns starfish feeds preferentially on Acropora species corals, and it sometimes has sudden, unexpected increases in population which may threaten this coral.
