= Acropora indonesia =

Conservation status
- Endangered (IUCN 3.1)

Scientific classification
- Kingdom: Animalia
- Phylum: Cnidaria
- Subphylum: Anthozoa
- Class: Hexacorallia
- Order: Scleractinia
- Family: Acroporidae
- Genus: Acropora
- Species: A. indonesia

Binomial name
- Acropora indonesia Wallace, 1997

Species of coral

Acropora indonesia is a species of acroporid coral that was first described by Dr Carden Wallace in 1997. Found in marine, tropical, shallow reefs in sheltered flat locations or gentle slopes, it occurs at depths of 10 to 20 m (33 to 66 ft). It is listed as a endangered species on the IUCN Red List, and it is thought to have a decreasing population. It is common and found over a large area, and is listed on CITES Appendix II.

== Description ==
Acropora indonesia occurs in dense tiered cushion-shaped structures that are up to 1 metre (3 ft 3 in) in depth. In colour, it is between dark grey/dark brown and pale, and the branches are tightly packed, thin, and upright. Branches at the perimeter of the structure have upward-facing ends and are up to 80mm long, and the axial corallites are normally obvious. The radial corallites are the same size. Within genus Acropora, there are no species similar to this. It is found in a marine environment in tropical, shallow reefs at depths of 10 to 20 m (33 to 66 ft), and also on gently sloping submerged surfaces and ledges. The species is composed of aragonite (calcium carbonate).

== Distribution ==
Acropora indonesia is common and found over a large area of the Indo-Pacific; Indonesia (all six regions), including the Banggai islands of Sulawesi and Raja Ampat islands, Thailand, the Solomon Islands, the Philippines, Singapore, Australia, Malaysia, Papua New Guinea, and Myanmar. There is no exact population for the species, but it is known to be decreasing overall, given threats from disease and bleaching caused by the rising sea temperatures. It is prey to starfish Acanthaster planci, which is becoming a common species, and is threatening numbers of Acropora species. It is also threatened by human activities, fishing, climate change, and industry. It is classed as an endangered species on the IUCN Red List, is listed under CITES Appendix II, and may occur in Marine Protected Areas.

== Taxonomy ==
C. C. Wallace first described the species in 1997 as Acropora indonesia, in Indonesia.
