= Acropora derawaensis =

Conservation status
- Endangered (IUCN 3.1)

Scientific classification
- Kingdom: Animalia
- Phylum: Cnidaria
- Subphylum: Anthozoa
- Class: Hexacorallia
- Order: Scleractinia
- Family: Acroporidae
- Genus: Acropora
- Species: A. derawaensis

Binomial name
- Acropora derawaensis Wallace, 1997

Species of coral

Acropora derawanensis is a species of acroporid coral found in the eastern Indian Ocean and the west central Pacific Ocean. It is particularly susceptible to coral bleaching, disease, and crown-of-thorns starfish predation.

== Description ==
Acropora derawanensis can grow to a metre or so in diameter. It forms upright (or occasionally prostrate) bush-like colonies of tangled slender branches. The axial corallites are elongated and tubular, while the radial corallites are smaller, also tubular or pocket-shaped, and have angular edges. This coral is usually reddish-brown, with contrasting white or blueish axial corallites.

== Distribution and habitat ==
Acropora derawanensis is native to the eastern Indian Ocean and the western central Pacific Ocean, its range extending from Malaysia and Indonesia to the Philippines, northern Australia and Papua New Guinea. It inhabits various reef habitats but is most common on sheltered reef slopes at depths of between 10 and 25 m (30 and 80 ft).

== Status ==
The reefs on which Acropora derawanensis lives are under threat from global warming, increased ocean acidification and reef destruction. It is a generally uncommon species of coral and is particularly susceptible to bleaching and coral diseases. The International Union for Conservation of Nature has assessed its conservation status as being an endangered species.
