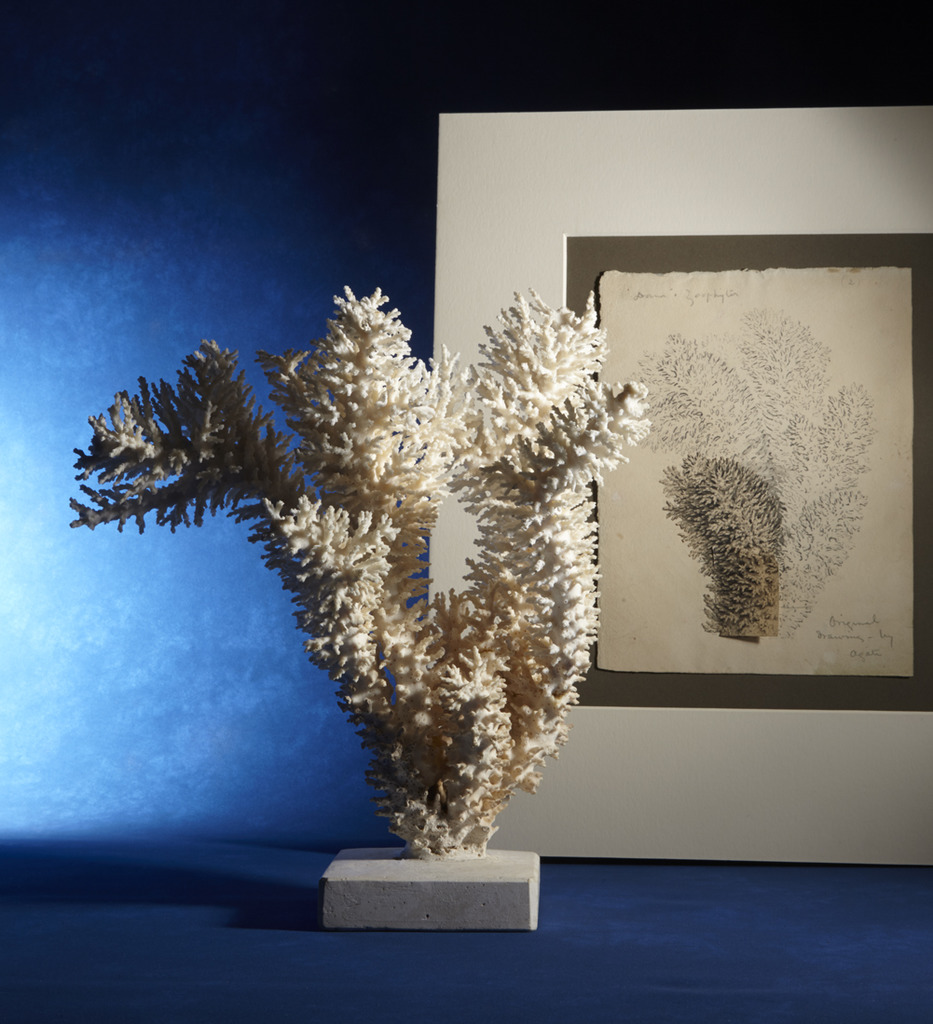
- Museum specimen

Conservation status
- Endangered (IUCN 3.1)

Scientific classification
- Kingdom: Animalia
- Phylum: Cnidaria
- Subphylum: Anthozoa
- Class: Hexacorallia
- Order: Scleractinia
- Family: Acroporidae
- Genus: Acropora
- Species: A. carduus

Binomial name
- Acropora carduus (Dana, 1846)

= Acropora carduus =

Species of coral

Acropora carduus is a species of acroporid coral found in the northern Indian Ocean and the central Indo-Pacific.
