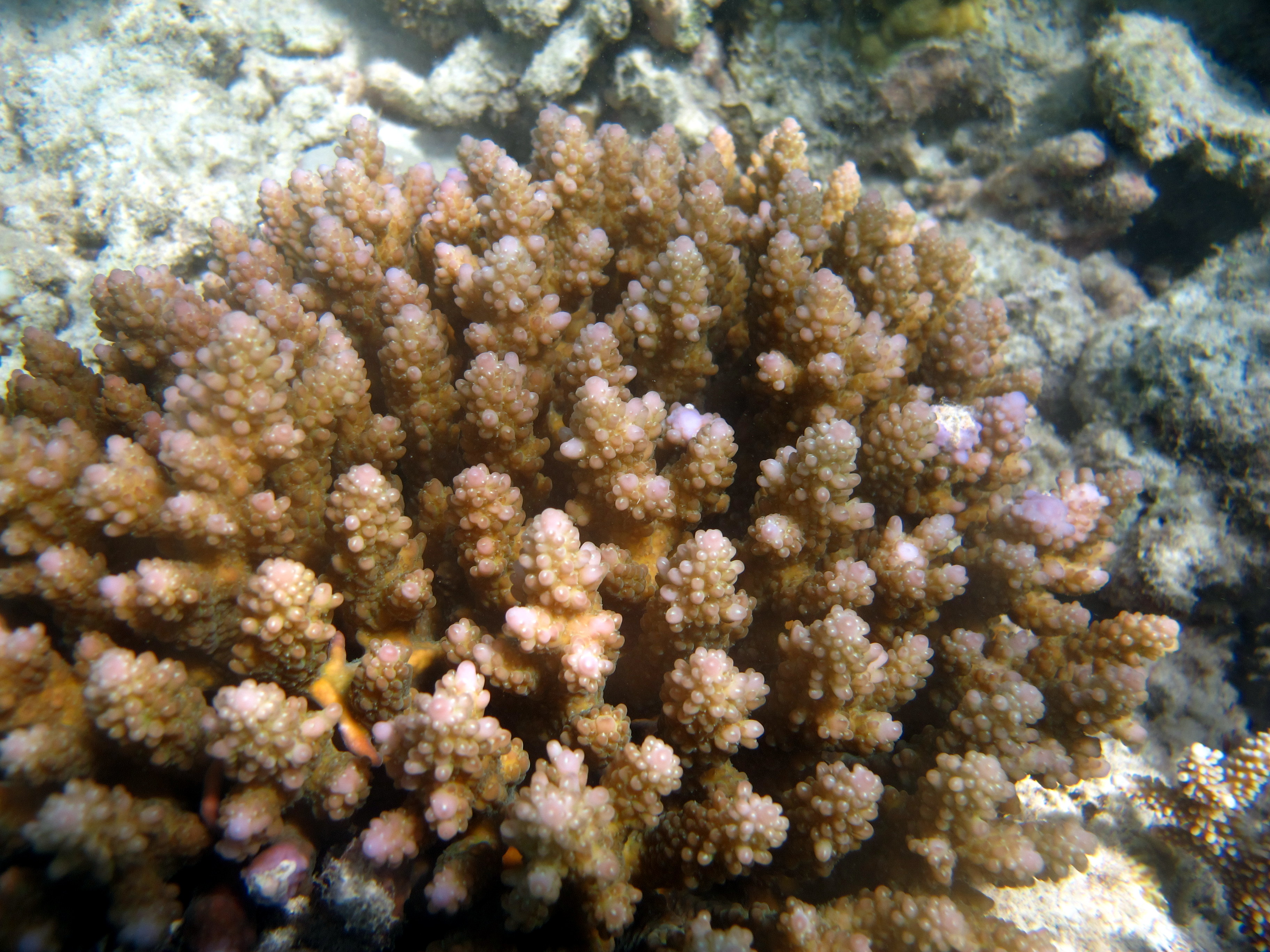

Conservation status
- Endangered (IUCN 3.1)

Scientific classification
- Kingdom: Animalia
- Phylum: Cnidaria
- Subphylum: Anthozoa
- Class: Hexacorallia
- Order: Scleractinia
- Family: Acroporidae
- Genus: Acropora
- Species: A. polystoma

Binomial name
- Acropora polystoma (Brook, 1891)

Synonyms
- Acropora massawensis von Marenzeller, 1907; Madrepora polystoma Brook, 1891

= Acropora polystoma =

Species of coral

Acropora polystoma is a species of acroporid coral that was first described by G. Brook in 1891. Found in marine, tropical, reefs on upper slopes where waves are strong, it occurs at depths between 3 and 10 m (9.8 and 32.8 ft). It is classed as an endangered species on the IUCN Red List, and it has a decreasing population. It is not common and found over a large area and is classified under CITES Appendix II.

== Description ==
Acropora polystoma is found in colonies of clumps or of corymbose plates with diameters not exceeding 80 centimetres (31 in). The branchlets have lengths of up to 100 millimetres (3.9 in) and diameters of between 5 and 15 millimetres (0.20 and 0.59 in). It is blue, cream, yellow, lavender, or brown in colour, and the branches are similar in size and become thinner towards the ends. The branches contain axial and radial corallites. Axial corallites are located on the ends of the branch tips, and are small with outer diameters of between 2.4 and 4 millimetres (0.094 and 0.157 in) and inner diameters of 0.8 to 1.5 millimetres (0.031 to 0.059 in). Radial corallites are regularly arranged and found in rows, and are tube-shaped. It contains a small number of randomly positioned spinules. It is similar to Acropora massawensis and other species of the robusta group. It is found in marine environments in tropical, shallow reefs, at depths between 3 and 10 m (9.8 and 32.8 ft). It occurs on slopes of reefs damaged by strong waves, and reef edges. It is composed of aragonite (calcium carbonate).

== Distribution ==
Acropora polystoma is uncommon and found over a large area; the Gulf of Aden, the Indian Ocean, the Indo-Pacific, Southeast Asia, Australia, and the western Pacific. The species also occurs in Japan, American Samoa, the Cook Islands, and five regions of Indonesia. It spawns in October in the French Polynesia. It is threatened by reef destruction, climate change, rising sea temperatures leading to bleaching, coral disease, being prey to starfish Acanthaster planci, and human activity and infrastructure. It is listed as an endangered species on the IUCN Red List, is under CITES Appendix II, and might be found in Marine Protected Areas.

== Taxonomy ==
It was first described by G. Brook in 1891 as Madrepora polystoma.
