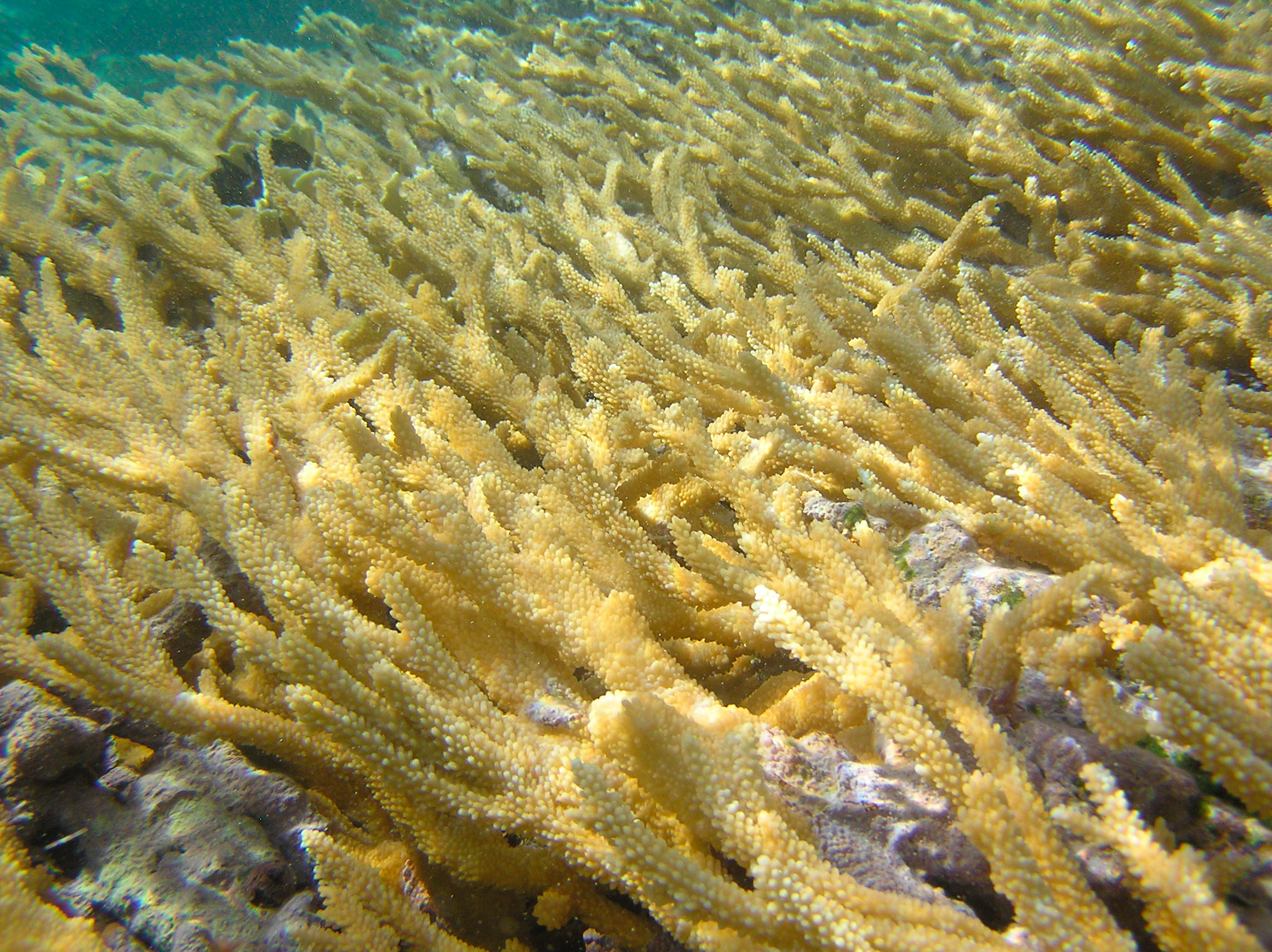

Conservation status
- Imperiled (NatureServe)

Scientific classification
- Kingdom: Animalia
- Phylum: Cnidaria
- Subphylum: Anthozoa
- Class: Hexacorallia
- Order: Scleractinia
- Family: Acroporidae
- Genus: Acropora
- Species: A. prolifera

Binomial name
- Acropora prolifera (Lamarck, 1816)

Synonyms
- List: Acropora muricata prolifera (Lamarck, 1816); Isopora muricata prolifera Lamarck, 1816; Madrepora muricata prolifera Lamarck, 1816; Madrepora ethica Duchassaing & Michelotti, 1860; Madrepora prolifera Lamarck, 1816

= Acropora prolifera =

Species of coral

Acropora prolifera, the fused staghorn coral, is a branching, colonial, stony coral found in shallow parts of the Caribbean Sea, the Bahamas and southern Florida. Acropora prolifera is a hybrid of two other Caribbean coral species, Acropora cervicornis and Acropora palmata.

== Description ==
Acropora prolifera is very similar to staghorn coral (Acropora cervicornis) in appearance but usually forms smaller, denser clumps. The branches are mostly horizontal and often divide near the tip, sometimes fusing with other branches. It also resembles elkhorn coral (Acropora palmata) and genetic studies show that it is a hybrid between that and staghorn coral. The corallites, the calcareous skeletal cups in which the polyps sit, are tubular and protrude from the surface of the branches. They are tightly packed and arranged in linear rows and there is a larger corallite at the tip of each branch. The branches are up to 2 cm (0.8 in) in diameter and the whole colony may grow to 1.2 metres (3 ft 11 in) across. The general colour is pale yellowish-brown and the branches have paler tips.

== Distribution ==
Acropora prolifera is found in the Caribbean Sea, the Gulf of Mexico, the Bahamas and southern Florida southwards to Colombia and Venezuela. It is generally found on outer reef slopes, in calm-water bays and in the lee of land masses, most commonly at a depth of around 7 metres (23 ft) but occasionally down to about 30 metres (98 ft). It is generally an uncommon species.

== Biology ==
Many reef corals have mass spawning events when vast numbers of gametes are released into the sea at the same time. This happens with elkhorn and stagshorn corals and when these sympatric corals spawn at the same time, F1 hybrids can be formed. These cannot propagate sexually but can reproduce asexually to increase the number of individuals. In the case of Acropora prolifera, hybrids come in two forms. Where the female gamete is derived from the elkhorn coral, the resulting offspring is bushy and compact. Where the female gamete comes from staghorn coral, the offspring adopts a more palmately dividing form.

Acropora prolifera is a zooxanthellate coral, the tissues containing dinoflagellates which live symbiotically within the cells. These are photosynthetic and use the carbon dioxide and waste products of the coral while at the same time supplying oxygen and organic compounds to their host.
