= Acropora plumosa =

Conservation status
- Endangered (IUCN 3.1)

Scientific classification
- Kingdom: Animalia
- Phylum: Cnidaria
- Subphylum: Anthozoa
- Class: Hexacorallia
- Order: Scleractinia
- Family: Acroporidae
- Genus: Acropora
- Species: A. plumosa

Binomial name
- Acropora plumosa Wallace & Wolstenholme, 1998

Species of coral

Acropora plumosa is a species of acroporid coral that was first described by Dr. C. C. Wallace and J. Wolstenholme in 1998. Found in marine, tropical, reefs on slopes sheltered from wave action, and on reef walls. It occurs at depths between 10 and 30 m (33 and 98 ft). It is classed as a vulnerable species on the IUCN Red List, and it has a decreasing population. It is not common and found over a large area and is classified under CITES Appendix II.

== Description ==
Acropora plumosa is found in irregular flat table-like colonies. Brown in colour, with branch tips being pale, some structures are broken away from main colonies, or may form in irregular patterns. Sometimes occurring in plate structures, there are linked together from the centre or sides of the structure, and are made of branches linked together, and a small number of sub-branches. The branches occur around one central point, and contain axial and radial corallites. Axial corallites are located on the branch and sub-branch tips, and are tube-shaped and small. The radial corallites occur on the sides of the branches and sub-branches, and are tube-shaped and well-spaced. This obvious species is similar to Acropora clathrata and Acropora pharaonis. It is found in a marine environment in tropical, shallow reefs, on sheltered slopes of reefs, deeper slopes, and reef walls. It occurs on walls of reefs at below 12 m (39 ft), but can be found at between 10 and 30 m (33 and 98 ft).

== Distribution ==
Acropora plumosa is uncommon and found over a large area; the Central Indo-Pacific. It occurs in four regions of Indonesia, and also in Palau, Papua New Guine, the Solomon Islands, Pohnpei, the Philippines, Raja Ampat, and Banggai. It is native to Australia, Thailand, Malaysia, Indonesia, Micronesia, Palau, Singapore, the Philippines, Papua New Guinea, and the Solomon Islands. This coral is threatened by reef destruction, climate change, rising sea temperatures leading to bleaching, coral disease, being prey to starfish Acanthaster planci, and human activity and infrastructure. It is listed as a vulnerable species on the IUCN Red List, is under CITES Appendix II, and may potentially occur within Marine Protected Areas.

== Taxonomy ==
It was first described by C. C. Wallace and J. Wolstenholme in 1998.
