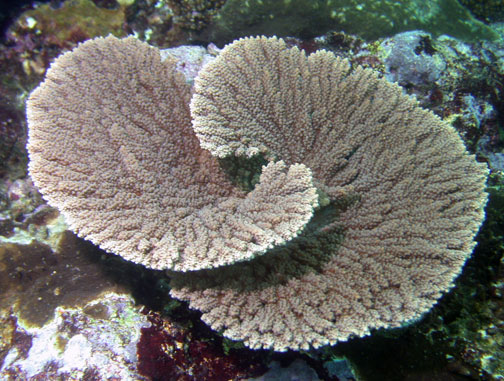

Conservation status
- Least Concern (IUCN 3.1)

Scientific classification
- Kingdom: Animalia
- Phylum: Cnidaria
- Subphylum: Anthozoa
- Class: Hexacorallia
- Order: Scleractinia
- Family: Acroporidae
- Genus: Acropora
- Species: A. clathrata

Binomial name
- Acropora clathrata (Brook, 1891)

= Acropora clathrata =

Species of coral

Acropora clathrata, commonly known as lattice table coral is a species of stony corals belonging to the family Acroporidae. They are a zooxanthellate coral, which are generally found in fringing reefs, sheltered reefs and back reef habitats, between the depths of 5–40 m (16–131 ft). Its size varies according to the depth at which they are found, with members of the species that have larger surface areas typically found at greater depths.

The species is native to Indo-Central Pacific region where it is widespread from Madagascar to the Red Sea to Western Australia.

== Ecology ==
The species is an important resource for Spirobranchus giganteus, which is found embedded in Acropora chlathrata in much higher densities than other stony corals. Oil-degrading bacteria affiliated with Gammaproteobacteria, Actinobacteria and Firmicutes harbored in the tissue of Acropora clathrata aid the survival of the species as oil concentrations in their environment change.

== Conservation ==
Per IUCN, the species has the status "least concern".

== Life cycle ==
Acropora eggs go through five changes in color as they develop. The first of these stages is white, followed by light-cream, cream, light-pink, and, finally, pink when mature.
