= Acropora hoeksemai =

Conservation status
- Endangered (IUCN 3.1)

Scientific classification
- Kingdom: Animalia
- Phylum: Cnidaria
- Subphylum: Anthozoa
- Class: Hexacorallia
- Order: Scleractinia
- Family: Acroporidae
- Genus: Acropora
- Species: A. hoeksemai

Binomial name
- Acropora hoeksemai Wallace, 1997

Species of coral

Acropora hoeksemai is a species of acroporid coral that was first described by Dr. Carden Wallace in 1997. Found in shallow reefs in a marine environment, it is found at depths of 8 to 20 m (26 to 66 ft). It is listed as a endangered species on the IUCN Red List, and has a decreasing population. It is common, listed on Appendix II of CITES, and is found over a large range.

== Description ==
Acropora hoeksemai is found in colonies that can be 1 to 2 m (3.3 to 6.6 ft) wide, made of branches joined in the centre of the structure. Some larger colonies have been observed at over 4 metres (13 ft). It is a light brown, white, or cream colour, and the branch ends are upturned, except on the outside of the structure. These branches are not regular, and contain both axial and radial corallites. Axial corallites can have diameters of between 2 and 2.6 millimetres (0.079 and 0.102 in). Radial corallites are tube-shaped, neat, orderly, and they are the same sizes. They contain basic spinules. The branches may grow to lengths of up to 150 millimetres (5.9 in) and diameters of between 7 and 15 millimetres (0.28 and 0.59 in). It is found in marine environments in shallow reefs at depths of 8 to 20 m (26 to 66 ft), and also on slopes and walls of reefs. It reaches maturity at between three and eight years, and it is believed to survive for more than ten years. It is composed of aragonite (calcium carbonate). When grown in captivity it reaches lengths of up to 25 centimetres (9.8 in). A. hoeksemai looks similar to Acropora valenciennesi and species of the Acropora divaricata group.

== Distribution ==
Acropora hoeksemai is a common species and found over a large range; the Solomans, the Indo-Pacific oceans, Papua New Guinea, Okinawa, Southeast Asia, and Thailand. It is native to Australia, Indonesia (found in five regions), Malaysia, Japan, Papua New Guinea, Singapore, Thailand, the Philippines, and the Solomon Islands. There is no specific population for the coral, but numbers are known to be decreasing. It is easily damaged by disease and bleaching, and is also threatened by being prey to starfish Acanthaster planci, climate change, temperature rises, fishing, infrastructure, and other human activities. Some species could be found in Marine Protected Areas. It is listed as an endangered species on the IUCN Red List, and also appears on CITES Appendix II.

== Taxonomy ==
It was first described by C.C. Wallace in 1997 as Acropora hoeksemai in Indonesia.
