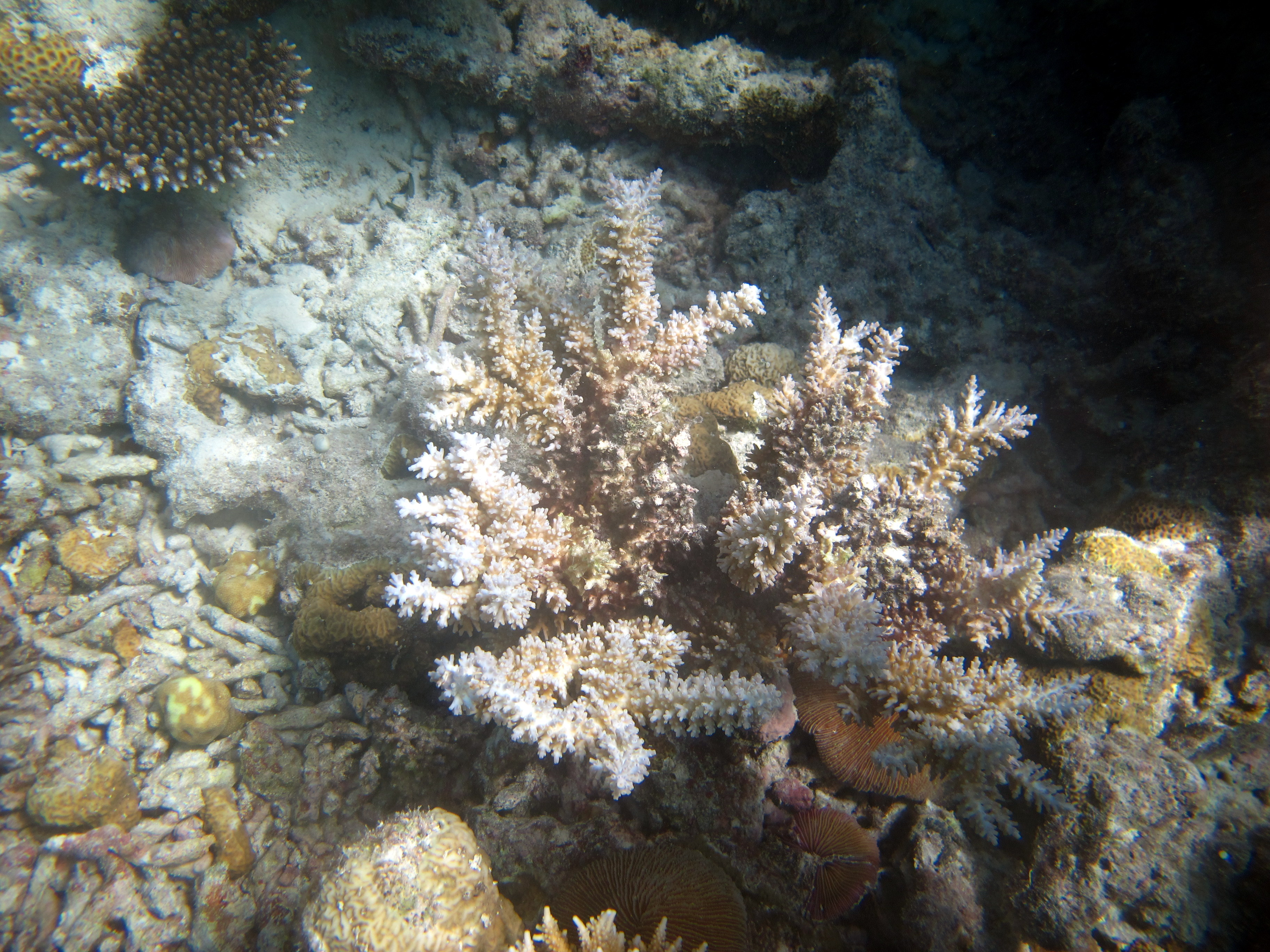

Conservation status
- Endangered (IUCN 3.1)

Scientific classification
- Kingdom: Animalia
- Phylum: Cnidaria
- Subphylum: Anthozoa
- Class: Hexacorallia
- Order: Scleractinia
- Family: Acroporidae
- Genus: Acropora
- Species: A. echinata

Binomial name
- Acropora echinata (Dana, 1846)

Synonyms
- Madrepora durvillei Milne Edwards, 1860; Madrepora echinata Dana, 1846; Madrepora procumbens Brook, 1892

= Acropora echinata =

Species of coral

Acropora echinata is a species of acroporid coral that was first described by James Dwight Dana in 1846. Found in shallow, tropical, sheltered reefs in marine environments, it is found at depths of 8 to 25 m (26 to 82 ft) in clear water. The species is listed as endangered on the IUCN Red List, and has a decreasing population. It is not common but found over a large area, and is listed under CITES Appendix II.

== Description ==
Acropora echinata colonies are made of flat, bottlebrush-like branches, with thin neatly-arranged branchlets. The tips of these branchlets are blue or purple, and the species is generally white or cream, but can be completely blue. The incipient axial and the axial corallites are indistinguishable, and the radial corallites are tube-shaped and short, and are not obvious or do not exist. It occurs in sheltered, tropical, shallow reefs at depths of 8 to 25 m (26 to 82 ft) in a marine environment of clear water, and can also be found on slopes of sand and the floors of lagoons. In aquariums it reaches diameters of up to 15 centimetres (5.9 in).

== Distribution ==
Acropora echinata is uncommon but occurs over a large range; Palau, central Pacific, Southeast Asia, the Indo-Pacific, Australia, the Indian Ocean, the East China Sea, and Japan. It has been found in five of the six regions of Indonesia, and was seen at 17 locations in the Marshall Islands. There is no population data for the species, but it is known to be decreasing. This species has a very low resistance to bleaching by the change in water temperature, with all specimens in Palau being affected, as of 1998. The decline of coral reefs, coral disease, fishing, climate change, acidification of oceans, pollution, and being prey to Acanthaster planci also affect the species. It occurs at temperatures between 27.99 and 28.09 °C (82.38 and 82.56 °F). It is listed as an endangered species on the IUCN Red List, and also on CITES Appendix II.

== Taxonomy ==
It was first described by Dana in 1846 as Madrepora echinata, and was later classed as a synonym of Madrepora durvillei by Milne Edwards in 1860, and then as a synonym of Madrepora procumbens by Brook in 1892. It was later described as a different species, Acropora echinata.
