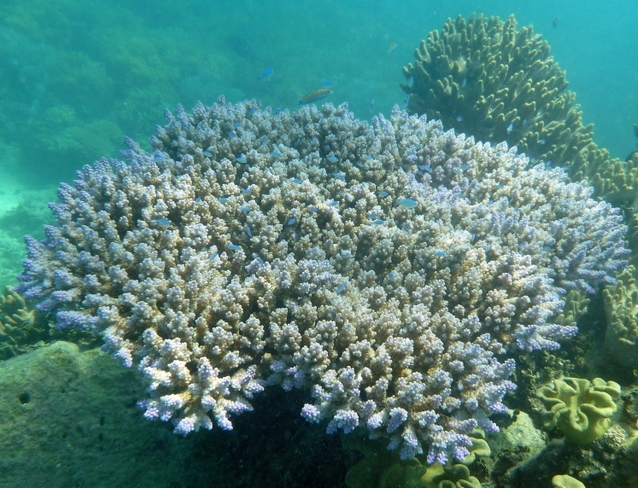

Conservation status
- Least Concern (IUCN 3.1)

Scientific classification
- Kingdom: Animalia
- Phylum: Cnidaria
- Subphylum: Anthozoa
- Class: Hexacorallia
- Order: Scleractinia
- Family: Acroporidae
- Genus: Acropora
- Species: A. valida

Binomial name
- Acropora valida (Dana, 1846)

Synonyms
- List: Acropora calamaria (Brook, 1892); Acropora dissimilis Verril, 1902; Acropora parapharaonis Veron, 2000; Acropora tumida (Verrill, 1866); Acropora variabilis (Klunzinger, 1879); Madrepora calamaria Brook, 1892; Madrepora coalescens Ortmann, 1889; Madrepora tumida Verrill, 1866; Madrepora valida Dana, 1846; Madrepora variabilis Klunzinger, 1879

= Acropora valida =

Species of coral

Acropora valida is a species of acroporid coral found in the Red Sea, the Gulf of Aden, the southwestern, northwestern and northern Indian Ocean, the Persian Gulf, the central Indo-Pacific, Australia, southeast Asia, Japan, the East China Sea, the oceanic western, central and far eastern Pacific Ocean, the northwestern Hawaiian Islands and Johnston Atoll. It occurs in tropical shallow reefs in a variety of reef habitats, at depths of 1 to 15 metres (3 ft 3 in to 49 ft 3 in).

== Taxonomy ==
It was originally described as Madrepora valida by Dana in 1846.

== Description ==
It is found in colonies of varying shapes, with diameters sometimes above 0.5 metres (20 in). It has small axial corallites and its radial corallites are appressed and in a variety of sizes. It is brown, cream, or yellow in colour, and branch tips are sometimes purple. It looks similar to Acropora variabilis.

== Distribution ==
It is classed as a least concern species on the IUCN Red List, but it is believed that its population is decreasing in line with the global decline of coral reefs, and it is listed under Appendix II of CITES. Figures of its population are unknown, but is likely to be threatened by the global reduction of coral reefs, the increase of temperature causing coral bleaching, climate change, human activity, the crown-of-thorns starfish (Acanthaster planci) and disease. It occurs in the Red Sea, the Gulf of Aden, the southwestern, northwestern and northern Indian Ocean, the Persian Gulf, the central Indo-Pacific, Australia, southeast Asia, Japan, the East China Sea, the oceanic western, central and far eastern Pacific Ocean, the northwestern Hawaiian Islands and Johnston Atoll. It is found at depths of between 1 and 15 metres (3 ft 3 in and 49 ft 3 in) in tropical shallow reefs in a large range of reef habitats.
