= List of threatened, endangered and extinct species in the Mariana Islands =

The following is a list of species (or subspecies) in the Mariana Islands, defined by the International Union for Conservation of Nature (IUCN) Red List or by the U.S. Fish & Wildlife Service (USFWS), as being extinct, critically endangered, endangered, threatened, vulnerable, conservation dependent, or near threatened. This article addresses species found in the geopolitical states of Guam and the Commonwealth of the Northern Mariana Islands (CNMI).

As of 2024, there were 32 species or subspecies in the Mariana Islands listed by the U.S. Fish & Wildlife Service as endangered or threatened. USFWS has cited threats to species from habitat loss and degradation; military activities; urbanization; recreational vehicles; nonnative animals such as feral ungulates (wild boar and sambar deer), water buffalo, rats, brown tree snakes, slugs, flatworms, ants, and wasps; nonnative plants; fires; typhoons; water extraction; and future climate change.

As of 2024, the USFWS and IUCN together listed 9 species or subspecies endemic to the Mariana Islands that have gone extinct: the little Mariana fruit bat (Pteropus tokudae); 5 birds (Guam flycatcher (Myiagra freycineti), bridled white-eye (Zosterops conspicillatus conspicillatus), Pagan reed-warbler (Acrocephalus yamashinae), Aguijan reed-warbler (Acrocephalus nijoi), the Mariana mallard (Anas oustaleti); and 3 snails (Partula desolata, Partula langfordi, Mount Alifana partula (Partula salifana)). Archaeological evidence has revealed another snail from Guam, the Partula desolata, to be extinct. Four undescribed and extinct bird species were excavated from Rota. Additionally, the Guam kingfisher (Todiramphus cinnamominus) is listed by the IUCN as extinct in the wild.

== Mammals ==
Common name	Scientific name	Image	US Fish & Wildlife conservation status	IUCN Red List status	GovGuam	Notes
Little Mariana fruit bat, Guam flying fox (fanihi)	Pteropus tokudae		Extinct (USFWS)	Extinct (IUCN)	Endangered (GovGuam, 1997)	Native to Guam. Last seen 1968; declared extinct in 2020 by IUCN, and 2023 by USFWS.
Pacific sheath-tailed bat (payeyi, paischeey, payesyes)	Emballonura semicaudata rotensis		Endangered (Marianas subspecies, USFWS)	Endangered (IUCN)	Endangered (GovGuam, 1997)	Subspecies native to Guam and CNMI
Mariana fruit bat, Mariana flying fox (fanihi)	Pteropus mariannus mariannus		Threatened (listed as Pteropus mariannus mariannus, USFWS)	Endangered (listed as Pteropus mariannus, IUCN)	Endangered (GovGuam, 1997)	Native to Guam and CNMI

== Amphibians and reptiles ==
Common name	Scientific name	Image	US Fish & Wildlife conservation status	IUCN Red List status	Notes
Slevin's skink, Mariana skink (gualik halumtanu, gholuuf)	Emoia slevini		Endangered (USFWS)	Critically endangered (IUCN)	Native to Guam and CNMI
Micronesia saw-tailed gecko	Perochirus ateles			Vulnerable (IUCN)	Possibly extinct from Guam and Marcus Island. Found in Federated States of Marshall Islands; Japan; Micronesia; Northern Mariana Islands.

== Endemic birds ==
Significant losses of bird species have likely occurred in the Mariana Islands in the past few millennia. A 1990 excavation of a late Holocene archeological site on Rota revealed the presence of 21 bird species, 12 of which have since become extinct or extirpated from Rota. Four of the species were not yet described and extinct: a small probably-flightless duck (Anatidae species), a giant ground-dove (Gallicolumba species), a large parrot (Psittacidae species), and a large parrotfinch (Erythrura).

The endemic birds on Guam, the southernmost Mariana island, were severely affected by the introduction of the brown tree snake after World War II. It has been reported that 11 of Guam's 14 terrestrial birds have become extinct or extirpated from Guam. A new tally after taxonomic revisions and the establishment of a population of Guam rail on Cocos Island, indicates there are now 5 of 16 native terrestrial (non-migratory) birds that remain in the wild on Guam: the Micronesian starling, yellow bittern (not endemic), and three endangered birds (Guam rail, Mariana common moorhen and Mariana swiftlet). The Guam kingfisher exists only in captivity.

Common name	Scientific name	Image	US Fish & Wildlife conservation status	IUCN Red List status	GovGuam	Notes
Pagan reed-warbler	Acrocephalus yamashinae			Extinct (IUCN)		Native to Pagan. Last seen in late 1970s.
Mariana mallard, Oustalet's duck (ngånga')	Anas oustaleti		Extinct (USFWS)			Native to Guam, Tinian and Saipan, possibly also Rota and Pagan. Last seen in 1979.
Bridled white-eye (Nosa')	Zosterops conspicillatus (listed by UWFWS as Zosterops conspicillatus conspicillatus)	Illustration available at Guampedia	Extinct (USFWS)	Extinct (IUCN)	Endangered (GovGuam, 1997)	Endemic to Guam and considered one of the most common bird species between early 1900s and 1930s. Last seen in 1983; declared extinct by USFWS and IUCN in 2023
Aguiguan reed-warbler	Acrocephalus nijoi			Extinct (IUCN)		Native to Aguiguan. Last seen in 1995.
Guam flycatcher, Guam broadbill (chuguangguang)	Myiagra freycineti			Extinct (IUCN)	Endangered (GovGuam, 1997)	Native to Guam. Last seen in 1984.
Nightingale reed warbler, Guam reed-warbler (gå'ga' karisu)	Acrocephalus luscinius (spelling per IUCN); listed by USFWS as Acrocephalus luscinia)		Endangered (USFWS)	Extinct (IUCN)		Native to Guam. Last seen in 1969.
Guam rufous fantail (subspecies of Micronesian rufous fantail) (chuchurika)	Rhipidura versicolor uraniae (or Rhipidura rufifrons uraniae)	Illustration available from Guampedia		Extinct (IUCN)	Endangered (GovGuam, 1997)	Guam subspecies extinct, last seen in 1984.
Micronesian honeyeater (égigi)	Myzomela rubrata saffordi	Illustration available from Guampedia		Extinct (IUCN)	Endangered (GovGuam, 1997)	Marianas subspecies extirpated from Guam (last seen 1986) but remains in the wild in CNMI.
Guam kingfisher (sihek)	Todiramphus cinnamominus (previously listed by USFWS as Halcyon cinnamomina cinnamomina)		Endangered (USFWS)	Extinct in the wild (IUCN)	Endangered (GovGuam, 1997)	Native to Guam
Guam rail (ko'ko')	Gallirallus owstoni (species name as listed by USFWS, and previously listed as Rallus owstoni; species name listed by IUCN as Hypotaenidia owstoni)		Endangered (USFWS) Downlisted from extinct in the wild (USFWS) in 2019 due to established population on Cocos Island	Critically endangered (IUCN)	Endangered (GovGuam, 1997)	Native to Guam.Previously extirpated from Guam but then reintroduced to Cocos Island off the coast of Guam in 2010.
Saipan reed-warbler	Acrocephalus hiwae			Critically endangered (IUCN)		Native to Saipan and Alamagan (CNMI)
Rota white-eye (nosa' luta)	Zosterops rotensis		Endangered (USFWS)	Critically endangered (IUCN)		Native to Rota (CNMI)
Mariana crow (åga)	Corvus kubaryi		Endangered (USFWS)	Critically endangered (IUCN)	Endangered (GovGuam, 1997)	Extirpated from Guam; extant on Rota (CNMI)
Micronesian megapode (sasangat)	Megapodius laperouse		Endangered (USFWS)	Near threatened (IUCN)		Native to Mariana Islands and Palau Extirpated from Guam. Extant in CNMI and Palau.
Mariana common moorhen (pulattat)	Gallinula chloropus guami		Endangered (USFWS)		Endangered (GovGuam, 1997)	Native to Guam and CNMI
Mariana swiftlet (yǻyaguak) (previously listed by USFWS as the Mariana gray swiftlet)	Aerodramus bartschi (previously reported by USFWS as Aerodramus vanikorensis bartschi)	Illustration available at Guampedia	Endangered (USFWS)	Vulnerable (IUCN)	Endangered (GovGuam, 1997)	Native to Guam and CNMI Now very rare on Guam
Mariana fruit-dove (totot)	Ptilinopus roseicapilla			Near threatened (IUCN)	Endangered (GovGuam, 1997)	Extirpated from Guam. Extant in CNMI
White-throated ground-dove (paluman ǻ'paka', female: paluman fache')	Pampusana xanthonura			Near threatened (IUCN)	Endangered (GovGuam, 1997)	Native the Mariana Islands and Yap (Caroline Island). Extirpated from Guam, except for rare sightings.
Golden white-eye	Cleptornis marchei			Endangered (IUCN)		Native to CNMI
Micronesian starling (såli)	Aplonis opaca (listed by GovGuam as subspecies Aplonis opaca guami)			Least concern throughout its range, but decreasing (IUCN)	Endangered (GovGuam, 1997)	Native to Micronesia
Saipan white-eye (nosa')	Zosterops saypani			Near threatened (IUCN)		Native to Rota, Tinian and Saipan

== Migratory birds ==
Common name	Scientific name	Image	US Fish & Wildlife conservation status	IUCN Red List status	Notes
Short-tailed albatross	Phoebastria albatrus		Endangered (USFWS)	Vulnerable (IUCN)	Native to North Pacific Ocean, mostly breeding on islands near Japan
Far eastern curlew	Numenius madagascariensis			Endangered (IUCN)	Breeds in eastern Asian Russia and Mongolia, but extant in coastal eastern Asia and western Pacific
Siberian sandplover	Charadrius mongolus			Endangered (IUCN)	Breeds in Australia, New Zealand and Russia, wintering in east Asia and western Pacific
White-necked petrel	Pterodroma cervicalis			Vulnerable (IUCN)	Breeds in New Zealand, Norfolk Island and Vanuatu; extant in other Pacific islands, Australia, and Mexico
Juan Fernandez petrel	Pterodroma externa			Vulnerable (IUCN)	Breeds in Chile; extant in French Polynesia, Guam, Mexico and Hawaii
Stejneger's petrel	Pterodroma longirostris			Vulnerable (IUCN)	Breeds in Chile; extant in French Polynesia, Guam, Japan, Marshall Islands, Federated States of Micronesia, CNMI
Common pochard	Aythya ferina			Vulnerable (IUCN)	Widespread in Europe, Asia and northern Africa; non-breeding in Guam and CNMI
Sharp-tailed sandpiper	Calidris acuminata			Vulnerable (IUCN)	Breeds in Russia; extant in Asia and western Pacific
Leach's storm-petrel	Hydrobates leucorhous			Vulnerable (IUCN)	Native throughout the oceans, non-breeding in the Mariana Islands
Matsudaira's storm-petrel	Hydrobates matsudairae			Vulnerable (IUCN)	Breeds in Japan; migrates from eastern African coast to western Pacific
Bar-tailed godwit	Limosa lapponica			Near threatened (IUCN)	Breeds in Russia and Alaska, extant in numerous other areas, including Guam and CNMI
Grey-tailed tattler	Tringa brevipes			Near threatened (IUCN)	Breeds in Mongolia; extant in Southeast Asia, Oceania and western Pacific Ocean

== Gastropods ==
Three of the 7 partulid snails described from the Mariana islands are extinct, and the remaining 4 are imperiled. Partulid populations have been affected by invasive snails such as the North American Euglandina species and the New Guinea flatworm (Platydemus manokwari).

Common name	Scientific name	Image	US Fish & Wildlife conservation status	IUCN Red List status	Notes
Mount Alifana partula	Partula salifana			Extinct (IUCN)	Native to the Mount Alifana region of southern Guam
	Partula desolata				Extinct. Known only from an archeological site on Rota (although no indication that there was any human consumption of the snails). The species survived until at least c. 1000. The describing authors chose the specific name "desolata" due to the desolation brought about upon the Partulidae populations in the Pacific.
Langford's tree snail (akaleha', denden)	Partula langfordi		Endangered (USFWS)	Extinct (IUCN)	Native to Aguigan
	Succinea quadrasi		Species was being evaluated for protected status by USFWS in 1994.	Endangered (IUCN)	Native to Guam
	Succinea piratarum		Species was being evaluated for protected status by USFWS in 1994.	Endangered (IUCN)	Native to Guam
Fragile tree snail, akaleha dogas, denden	Samoana fragilis		Endangered (USFW)	Endangered (IUCN)	Native to Guam and Rota
Humped tree snail (akaleha', denden)	Partula gibba		Endangered (USFWS)	Endangered (IUCN)	Native to Guam and CNMI
Guam tree snail (akaleha', denden)	Partula radiolata		Endangered (USFWS)	Endangered (IUCN)	Native to Guam

=== Gastropods proposed to have protected status ===
- Partula lutaensis - endemic to Rota; species first described in 2021 and the describing authors advised it be "listed as Endangered as soon as possible."

== Insects ==
Common name	Scientific name	Image	US Fish & Wildlife conservation status	IUCN Red List status	Notes
Rota blue damselfly (dulalas luta, dulalas luuta)	Ischnura luta		Endangered (USFWS)	Data Deficient (IUCN)	Native to Rota (CNMI)
Mariana wandering butterfly (ababbang, libweibwogh)	Vagrans egistina		Endangered (USFWS)		Native to Guam and CNMI
Mariana eight-spot butterfly (ababbang, libweibwogh)	Hypolimnas octocula marianensis		Endangered (USFWS)		Native to Guam and Saipan

== Plants ==
Common name	Scientific name	Image	US Fish & Wildlife conservation status	IUCN Red List status	GovGuam	Notes
Hayun lagu	Serianthes nelsonii		Endangered (USFW)	Critically endangered (IUCN)	Endangered (GovGuam, 1997)	Native to Guam and Rota
No known common name	Osmoxylon mariannense		Endangered (USFWS)	Critically endangered (IUCN)		Native to CNMI
No known common name	Eugenia bryanii		Endangered (USFWS)			Native to Guam
Paudedo	Hedyotis megalantha		Endangered (USFWS)			Native to Guam
Ufa halumtanu, ufa halom tano	Heritiera longipetiolata		Endangered (USFWS)	Vulnerable (IUCN)	Endangered (GovGuam, 1997)	Native to Guam and CNMI
No known common name	Phyllanthus saffordii		Endangered (USFWS)			Native to Guam
Aplokating palaoan	Psychotria malaspinae		Endangered (USFWS)			Native to Guam
Berenghenas halomtano	Solanum guamense		Endangered (USFWS)			Native to Guam and CNMI
No known common name	Nesogenes rotensis		Endangered (USFWS)			Native to CNMI
No known common name	Tinospora homosepala		Endangered (USFWS)			Native to Guam
Fadang, faadang	Cycas micronesica		Threatened (USFWS)	Endangered (IUCN)		Native to Guam, CNMI, States of Micronesia, and Palau
Tree fern (tsatsa)	Sphaeropteris lunulata (Listed by GovGuam as Cyathea lunulata)			Least concern (IUCN)	Endangered (GovGuam, 1997)	Native from Sulawesi and Papuasia to the western Pacific
Narra	Pterocarpus indicus			Endangered (IUCN)		Native from Indo-China to western Pacific ocean
No known common name	Tuberolabium guamense		Threatened (USFWS)			Native to Guam and CNMI
No known common name	Tabernaemontana rotensis		Threatened (USFWS)			Native to Guam and CNMI
Siboyas halom tano, Cebello halumtano	Bulbophyllum guamense		Threatened (USFWS)			Native to Guam and CNMI
No known common name	Dendrobium guamense		Threatened (USFWS)			Native to Guam and CNMI
No known common name	Maesa walkeri		Threatened (USFWS)			Native to Guam and CNMI
No known common name	Nervilia jacksoniae		Threatened (USFWS)			Native to Guam and CNMI
	Terminalia rostrata			Vulnerable		Native to Asuncion (CNMI)
Mapuñao	Aglaia mariannensis			Vulnerable (IUCN)		Native to Mariana and Caroline islands
Ifit	Intsia bijuga			Near threatened		Native to Indian Ocean and western Pacific Ocean

=== Plants proposed to have protected status ===
- Pogostemon guamensis - endemic to Guam; first described in 2020 and recommended by the describing authors to be listed as critically endangered.
- Bulbophyllum raulersoniae - endemic to Guam; first described in 2022 and recommended by the describing authors to be listed as endangered.

== Marine animals ==
Common name	Scientific name	Image	US Fish & Wildlife conservation status	IUCN Red List status	Notes
True giant clam (Chamorro: hima)	Tridacna gigas		2024 was proposed to be listed as endangered (USFWS)	Extirpated from Guam and CNMI; Critically endangered (IUCN)	Native to western Pacific. Extirpated from Guam and CNMI due to longstanding subsistence harvesting. Reintroduction attempts have had limited success due to poaching.
Smooth giant clam	Tridacna derasa		2024 was proposed to be listed as endangered (USFWS)	Extirpated from Guam and CNMI; Endangered (IUCN)	Native to Australia; Fiji; Indonesia; New Caledonia; Palau; Papua New Guinea; Philippines; Solomon Islands; Tonga; extirpated from Guam and CNMI due to longstanding subsistence harvesting. Reintroduction attempts have had limited success.
Horse's hoof clam	Hippopus hippopus		2024 was proposed to be listed as threatened (USFWS)	Extirpated from Guam and CNMI; Vulnerable (IUCN)	Native to western Pacific islands and Australia; extirpated from Guam and CNMI due to a long history of subsistence harvesting
Hawksbill sea turtle	Eretmochelys imbricata		Endangered (USFWS)	Critically endangered (IUCN)	Native to tropical and temperate oceans
Oceanic whitetip shark	Carcharhinus longimanus		Threatened (USFWS)	Critically endangered (IUCN)	Native to tropical and temperate oceans
Green sea turtle	Chelonia mydas		Endangered (central western Pacific population, USFWS)	Endangered (IUCN)	Native to tropical and temperate oceans
Sei whale	Balaenoptera borealis		Endangered (USWFS)	Endangered (IUCN)	Native throughout the oceans
Leatherback turtle	Dermochelys coriacea		Endangered (USFWS)	Vulnerable (IUCN)	Native to tropical and temperate oceans
Sperm whale	Physeter macrocephalus		Endangered (USFWS)	Vulnerable (IUCN)	Native throughout the oceans
False killer whale	Pseudorca crassidens		Endangered (USFWS)	Near threatened (IUCN)	Native throughout tropical and many temperate oceans
Oceanic manta ray, Giant oceanic manta ray	Mobula birostris		Threatened (USWFS)	Endangered (IUCN)	Native to tropical and temperate oceans
Pelagic thresher	Alopias pelagicus			Endangered (IUCN)	Native to Indian and Pacific Oceans
Basking shark	Cetorhinus maximus			Endangered (IUCN)	Native to Pacific and Atlantic Oceans
Sharptooth lemon shark	Negaprion acutidens			Endangered (IUCN)	Native from Middle East to Western Pacific coasts
Grey reef shark	Carcharhinus amblyrhynchos			Endangered (IUCN)	Native from tropical Indo-West and central Pacific Oceans, including the Marianas, and parts of the eastern tropical Pacific Ocean
Longfin mako	Isurus paucus			Endangered (IUCN)	Native to tropical and temperate oceans
Shortfin mako	Isurus oxyrinchus			Endangered (IUCN)	Native to tropical and temperate oceans
Bentfin devil ray	Mobula thurstoni			Endangered (IUCN)	Native to tropical and temperate oceans
Shorthorned pygmy devil ray	Mobula kuhlii			Endangered (IUCN)	Native to Indian Ocean and Pacific Ocean
Sicklefin devil ray	Mobula tarapacana			Endangered (ICUN)	Native to tropical and temperate oceans
Longhorned pygmy devil ray	Mobula eregoodoo			Endangered (IUCN)	Native to coastal waters from eastern Africa and Middle East to western Pacific
Spinetail devil ray	Mobula mobular			Endangered (IUCN)	Native to tropical and temperate oceans
Spotted eagle ray	Aetobatus ocellatus			Endangered (IUCN)	Native to Indian Ocean and Pacific Ocean
Giant wrasse	Cheilinus undulatus			Endangered (IUCN)	Native from Indian Ocean to Western Pacific
Black teatfish	Holothuria nobilis			Endangered (IUCN)	Native to Pacific Ocean
Pineapple sea cucumber, prickly redfish	Thelenota ananas			Endangered (IUCN)	Native to the Indian and Pacific Oceans, including the Marianas, excluding Hawaii
White shark	Carcharodon carcharias			Vulnerable (IUCN)	Native to tropical and temperate oceans
Blacktip reef shark	Carcharhinus melanopterus			Vulnerable (IUCN)	Native to Indian Ocean and western Pacific
Whitetip reef shark	Triaenodon obesus			Vulnerable (IUCN)	Native to Indian Ocean and western Pacific
Silvertip shark	Carcharhinus albimarginatus			Vulnerable (IUCN)	Native to Indian Ocean and Pacific Ocean
Bigeye thresher	Alopias superciliosus			Vulnerable (IUCN)	Native to many coastal areas worldwide, possibly to Guam and CNMI
Common thresher	Alopias vulpinus			Vulnerable (IUCN)	Native to many coastal areas worldwide, possibly to Guam and CNMI
Tawny nurse shark	Nebrius ferrugineus			Vulnerable (IUCN)	Native to Indian Ocean and Pacific Ocean
Reef manta ray	Mobula alfredi			Vulnerable (IUCN)	Native to Indian Ocean and Pacific Ocean
Blotched fantail ray	Taeniurops meyeni			Vulnerable (IUCN)	Native to Indian Ocean and Pacific Ocean
Blue marlin	Makaira nigricans			Vulnerable (IUCN)	Native to tropical and temperate oceans
Sailfish	Istiophorus platypterus			Vulnerable (IUCN)	Native to tropical and temperate oceans
Bigeye tuna	Thunnus obesus			Vulnerable (IUCN)	Native to tropical and temperate oceans
Camouflage grouper	Epinephelus polyphekadion			Vulnerable (IUCN)	Native to Indian Ocean and Pacific Ocean
Green humphead parrotfish	Bolbometopon muricatum			Vulnerable (IUCN)	Native to Indian Ocean and Pacific Ocean
Brown-marbled grouper	Epinephelus fuscoguttatus			Vulnerable (IUCN)	Native to Indian Ocean and Pacific Ocean
Harlequin filefish	Oxymonacanthus longirostris			Vulnerable (IUCN)	Native to Indian Ocean and Pacific Ocean
Red-striped coral goby	Gobiodon axillaris			Vulnerable	Native to Indian Ocean and western Pacific Ocean
Shortjaw bonefish	Albula glossodonta			Vulnerable (IUCN)	Native to Indian Ocean and Pacific Ocean
Ocean sunfish	Mola mola			Vulnerable (IUCN)	Native to tropical and temperate oceans
	Actinopyga echinites			Vulnerable (IUCN)	Native to tropical and temperate oceans
	Actinopyga mauritiana			Vulnerable (IUCN)	Native to Indian Ocean and eastern Pacific Ocean
	Actinopyga miliaris			Vulnerable (IUCN)	Native to Indian Ocean and Pacific Ocean
	Holothuria fuscogilva			Vulnerable (IUCN)	Native to Indian Ocean and Pacific Ocean

=== Marine animals proposed to be listed for conservation ===
In 2024, USFWS proposed 10 species of clam be protected under the Endangered Species Act (ESA), of which the following are native to the Mariana Islands:

- Smooth giant clam (Tridacna derasa) - extirpated from Guam and CNMI; see above. Proposed to be listed as endangered under the ESA.
- True giant clam (Tridacna gigas) - extirpated from Guam and CNMI; see above. Proposed to be listed as endangered under the ESA.
- Horse's hoof clam (Hippopus hippopus) - extirpated from Guam and CNMI; see above. Proposed to be listed as threatened under the ESA.
- Maxima clam (Tridacna maxima) - native to Indian Ocean and Pacific Ocean, and is the most common giant clam species found on Guam and CNMI. Proposed to be listed as threatened under the ESA.
- Tridacna crocea - possibly extinct from Guam and CNMI. Proposed to be listed as threatened under the ESA.

In addition, the fluted giant clam (Tridacna squamosa), is proposed to be listed as endangered. Sources vary as to whether it is an introduced (non-native) or native species in the Marianas, but it remains rare on Guam (less than 10 individuals per hectare) and is not present in the CNMI. It was determined by the USFWS to not be at risk of extinction in its native range in the foreseeable future, but nonetheless was proposed to be listed as threatened under the ESA due to the similarity of products from this species as from the other species listed above.

=== Marine animals listed as near threatened by IUCN ===
- Shortfin eel (Anguilla bicolor)
- Redeye goby (Bryaninops natans)
- Chevron butterflyfish (Chaetodon trifascialis)
- Deshayesiella sirenkoi - endemic to deep ocean off the Bonin and Mariana Islands
- Tiger shark (Galeocerdo cuvier)
- Ceram coralgoby (Gobiodon ceramensis)
- Bombay duck lizardfish (Harpadon nehereus)
- Oenopota ogasawarana - endemic to deep ocean off the Mariana Islands
- Pachydermia sculpta
- Dick's damsel (Plectroglyphidodon dickii)
- Blue shark (Prionace glauca)
- Narrow-barred Spanish mackerel (Scomberomorus commerson)
- Shinkailepas kaikatensis - endemic to hydrothermal vents off the Mariana Islands
- Pacific bluefin tuna (Thunnus orientalis)
- Swordfish (Xiphias gladius)

=== Corals ===
Common name	Scientific name	Image	US Fish & Wildlife conservation status	IUCN Red List status	Notes
	Anacropora spinosa		Threatened (USFWS)	Endangered (IUCN)	Native to Southeast Asia and southwestern Pacific Ocean
	Porites eridani			Endangered (IUCN)	Native to Southeast Asia and southwestern Pacific Ocean
	Acropora globiceps		Threatened (USFWS)	Vulnerable (IUCN)	Native to southeast Asia and Pacific ocean
	Pavona diffluens		Threatened (USFWS)	Vulnerable (IUCN)	Native to Middle Eastern Indian Ocean, India, and Micronesia
	Acropora tenella		Threatened (USFWS)	Vulnerable (IUCN)	Native to southeast Asia, Mariana Islands and Papua New Guinea
	Porites napopora		Threatened (USFWS)	Vulnerable (IUCN)	Native to Southeast Asia and Micronesia
	Porites napopora		Threatened (USFWS)	Vulnerable (IUCN)	Native to Southeast Asia and Micronesia
	Seriatopora aculeata		Threatened (USFWS)	Vulnerable (IUCN)	Native to Indian Ocean and Pacific Ocean
	Seriatopora aculeata		Threatened (USFWS)	Vulnerable (IUCN)	Native to Indian Ocean and Pacific Ocean
	Acanthastrea brevis			Vulnerable (IUCN)	Native to Indian Ocean and western Pacific Ocean
	Acropora aculeus			Vulnerable (IUCN)	Native to Indian Ocean and Pacific Ocean
	Acropora acuminata			Vulnerable (IUCN)	Native to Indian Ocean and Pacific Ocean
	Acropora aspera			Vulnerable (IUCN)	Native to Indian Ocean and western Pacific Ocean
	Acropora listeri			Vulnerable (IUCN)	Native to Indian Ocean and Pacific Ocean
	Acropora lovelli			Vulnerable (IUCN)	Native to Indian Ocean and Pacific Ocean
	Acropora palmerae			Vulnerable (IUCN)	Native to Indian Ocean and Pacific Ocean
	Acropora striata			Vulnerable (IUCN)	Native to southeast Asia and western Pacific Ocean
	Acropora vaughani			Vulnerable (IUCN)	Native to Indian Ocean and Pacific Ocean
	Acropora verweyi			Vulnerable (IUCN)	Native to Indian Ocean and Pacific Ocean
	Alveopora allingi			Vulnerable (IUCN)	Native to Indian Ocean and Pacific Ocean
	Alveopora fenestrata			Vulnerable (IUCN)	Native to Indian Ocean and western Pacific Ocean
	Alveopora verrilliana			Vulnerable (IUCN)	Native to Indian Ocean and Pacific Ocean
	Anacropora puertogalerae			Vulnerable (IUCN)	Native to Indian Ocean and western Pacific Ocean
	Cyphastrea agassizi			Vulnerable (IUCN)	Native to southeast Asia and Pacific Ocean
	Dipsastraea laddi			Vulnerable (IUCN)	Native to southeast Asia and Pacific Ocean
	Euphyllia cristata			Vulnerable (IUCN)	Native to Indian Ocean and western Pacific Ocean
	Fimbriaphyllia paraancora			Vulnerable (IUCN)	Native to eastern Indian Ocean and western Pacific Ocean
	Isopora cuneata			Vulnerable (IUCN)	Native to Indian Ocean and western Pacific Ocean
	Leptoseris incrustans			Vulnerable (IUCN)	Native to eastern Indian Ocean and western Pacific Ocean
	Lobophyllia ishigakiensis			Vulnerable (IUCN)	Native to Indian Ocean and western Pacific Ocean
	Micromussa regularis			Vulnerable (IUCN)	Native to eastern Indian Ocean and western Pacific Ocean
	Montipora caliculata			Vulnerable (IUCN)	Native to Indian Ocean and Pacific Ocean
	Montipora lobulata			Vulnerable (IUCN)	Native to Indian Ocean and Pacific Ocean
	Pachyseris rugosa			Vulnerable (IUCN)	Native to Indian Ocean and Pacific Ocean
	Pavona cactus			Vulnerable (IUCN)	Native to Indian Ocean and Pacific Ocean
	Pavona bipartita			Vulnerable (IUCN)	Native to Indian Ocean and Pacific Ocean
	Pavona decussata			Vulnerable (IUCN)	Native to Indian Ocean and Pacific Ocean
	Pavona venosa			Vulnerable (IUCN)	Native to Indian Ocean and western Pacific Ocean
	Pectinia alcicornis			Vulnerable (IUCN)	Native to southeast Asia and western Pacific Ocean
	Psammocora stellata			Vulnerable (IUCN)	Native to Indian Ocean and Pacific Ocean to American coast.
	Physogyra lichtensteini			Vulnerable (IUCN)	Native to Indian Ocean and Pacific Ocean
	Pocillopora elegans			Vulnerable (IUCN)	Native to Southeast Asia through Pacific to American coast
	Pocillopora verrucosa (synonym: Pocillopora danae)			Vulnerable (IUCN)	Native to Pacific Ocean
	Porites horizontalata			Vulnerable (IUCN)	Native to Indian Ocean and western Pacific Ocean
	Porites nigrescens			Vulnerable (IUCN)	Native to Indian Ocean and western Pacific Ocean
	Turbinaria mesenterina			Vulnerable (IUCN)	Native to Indian Ocean and western Pacific Ocean
	Turbinaria reniformis			Vulnerable (IUCN)	Native to Indian Ocean and Pacific Ocean
	Turbinaria stellulata			Vulnerable (IUCN)	Native to Indian Ocean and Pacific Ocean

=== Corals listed as near threatened by the IUCN ===
- Acanthastrea hillae
- Acanthastrea rotundoflora
- Acropora digitifera
- Branch coral (Acropora florida)
- Staghorn coral (Acropora formosa)
- Acropora granulosa
- Finger coral (Acropora humilis)
- Acropora loripes
- Acropora millepora
- Acropora nasuta
- Acropora secale
- Acropora lutkeni
- Acropora monticulosa
- Acropora tenuis
- Alveopora spongiosa
- Alveopora viridis
- Astraeosmilia maxima
- Coelastrea palauensis
- Ctenactis albitentaculata
- Diploastrea heliopora
- Dipsastraea helianthoides
- Dipsastraea maritima
- Dipsastraea marshae
- Dipsastraea matthaii
- Torch coral (Euphyllia glabrescens)
- Favites abdita
- Favites colemani
- Favites halicora
- Favites flexuosa
- Favites magnistellata
- Favites valenciennesii
- Common mushroom coral (Fungia fungites)
- Galaxea fascicularis
- Galaxea paucisepta
- Goniastrea stelligera
- Goniopora columna
- Goniopora lobata
- Goniopora minor
- Hydnophora exesa
- Hydnophora microconos
- Catch bowl coral (Isopora palifera)
- Leptastrea bottae
- Leptoria phrygia
- Merulina triangularis
- Micromussa amakusensis
- Montipora efflorescens
- Montipora foliosa
- Montipora foveolata
- Montipora venosa
- Intermediate valley coral (Oulophyllia crispa)
- Paragoniastrea russelli
- Pavona minuta
- Pectinia paeonia
- Platygyra ryukyuensis
- Plerogyra simplex
- Bubble coral (Plerogyra sinuosa)
- Pocillopora eydouxi
- Porites annae
- Porites cylindrica
- Porites densa
- Porites lobata
- Porites murrayensis
- Porites stephensoni
- Psammocora contigua
- Psammocora digitata
- Psammocora obtusangula
- Psammocora vaughani
- Birdsnest coral (Seriatopora caliendrum)
- Seriatopora stellata
- Smooth cauliflower coral (Stylophora pistillata)

== Crustaceans ==
Common name	Scientific name	Image	US Fish & Wildlife conservation status	IUCN Red List status	Notes
Coconut crab	Birgus latro			Vulnerable (IUCN)	Native to Indian Ocean and eastern Pacific Ocean

== Recovered species ==
Common name	Scientific name	Image	US Fish & Wildlife conservation status	IUCN Red List status	Notes
Tinian monarch	Monarcha takatsukasae		On the USFWS endangered species list since 1970 but delisted in 2004 due to recovery of population. In 2013, the Center for Biological Diversity petitioned for the species to again be listed as endangered, but the USFWS determined that protected status was not warranted.	Near threatened (IUCN)	Native to Tinian, and introduced to Guguan
