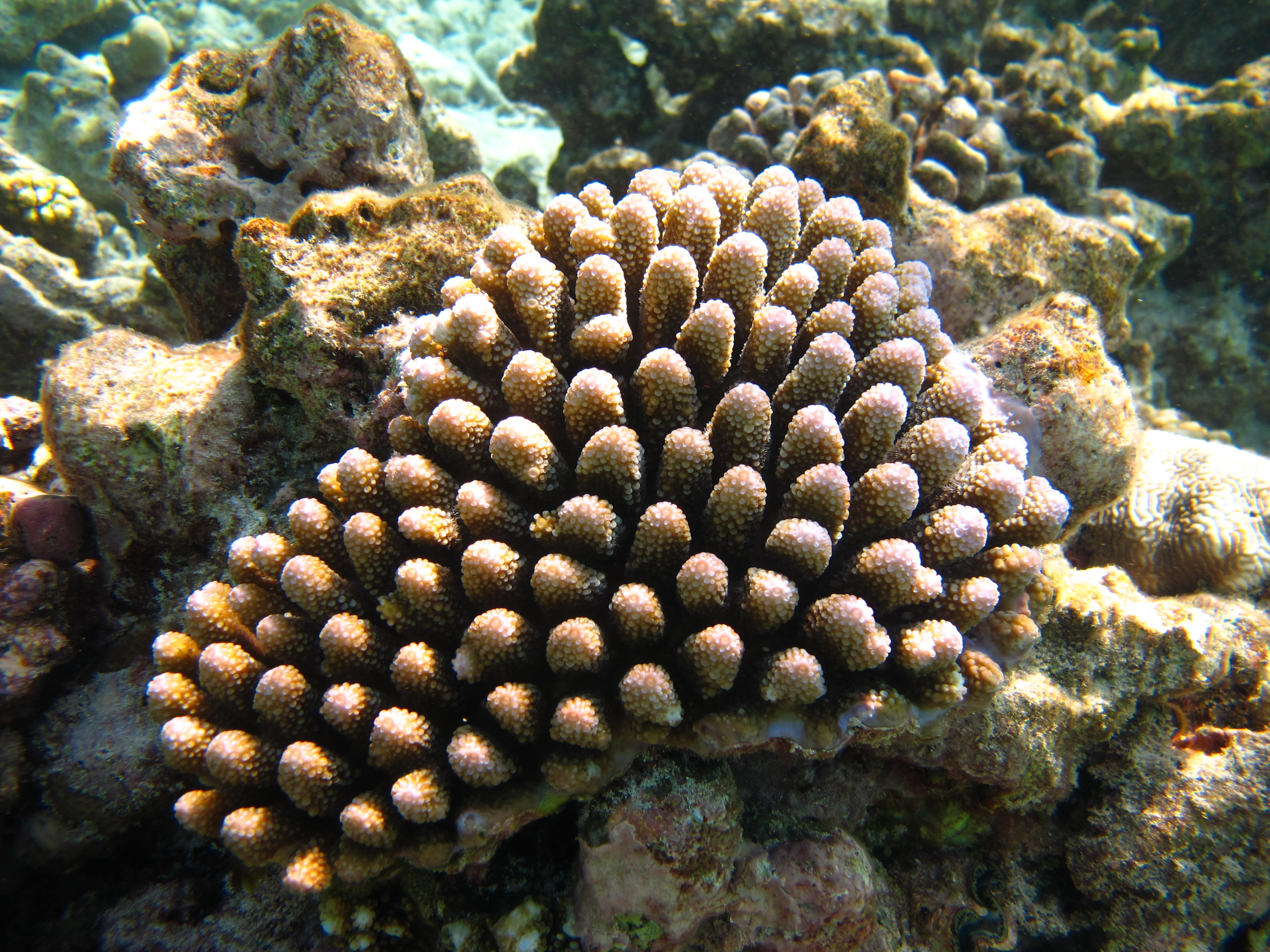

Conservation status
- Endangered (IUCN 3.1)

- Threatened (ESA)

Scientific classification
- Kingdom: Animalia
- Phylum: Cnidaria
- Subphylum: Anthozoa
- Class: Hexacorallia
- Order: Scleractinia
- Family: Acroporidae
- Genus: Acropora
- Species: A. globiceps

Binomial name
- Acropora globiceps (Dana, 1846)

Synonyms
- Madrepora globiceps Dana, 1846

= Acropora globiceps =

Species of coral

Acropora globiceps is a species of acroporid coral found in the oceanic central and western Pacific Ocean and central Indo-Pacific. It can also be found in the Great Barrier Reef, the Philippines, the Andaman Islands, Polynesia, Micronesia and the Pitcairn Islands. It occurs on the slopes of reefs, the flats of reefs, in tropical shallow reefs, and at depths of around 8 m (26 ft). It was described by James Dwight Dana in 1846.

== Description ==
Acropora globiceps occurs in small digitate colonies consisting of compact branches. Its corallites are of no specific size; specimens on slopes of reefs have had tube-shaped corallites, and specimens on reef flats have had corallites built into the branches. The axial corallites are small, and the radial corallites may be ordered in rows. It is cream or blue in colour. It looks similar to Acropora gemmifera, Acropora monticulosa, Acropora retusa, and Acropora secale.

== Distribution ==
It is classed as an endangered species on the IUCN Red List and it is believed that its population is decreasing; it is also listed under Appendix II of CITES. Figures of its population are unknown, but is likely to be threatened by the global reduction of coral reefs, the increase of temperature causing coral bleaching, climate change, human activity, the crown-of-thorns starfish (Acanthaster planci) and disease. It is found in the central and western Pacific Ocean and the central Indo-Pacific, including the Great Barrier Reef, the Andaman Islands, the Philippines, Polynesia, the Pitcairn Islands, and Micronesia. It is found at around 8 metres (26 ft) below the surface.

== Taxonomy ==
It was described as Madrepora globiceps by Dana in 1846.
