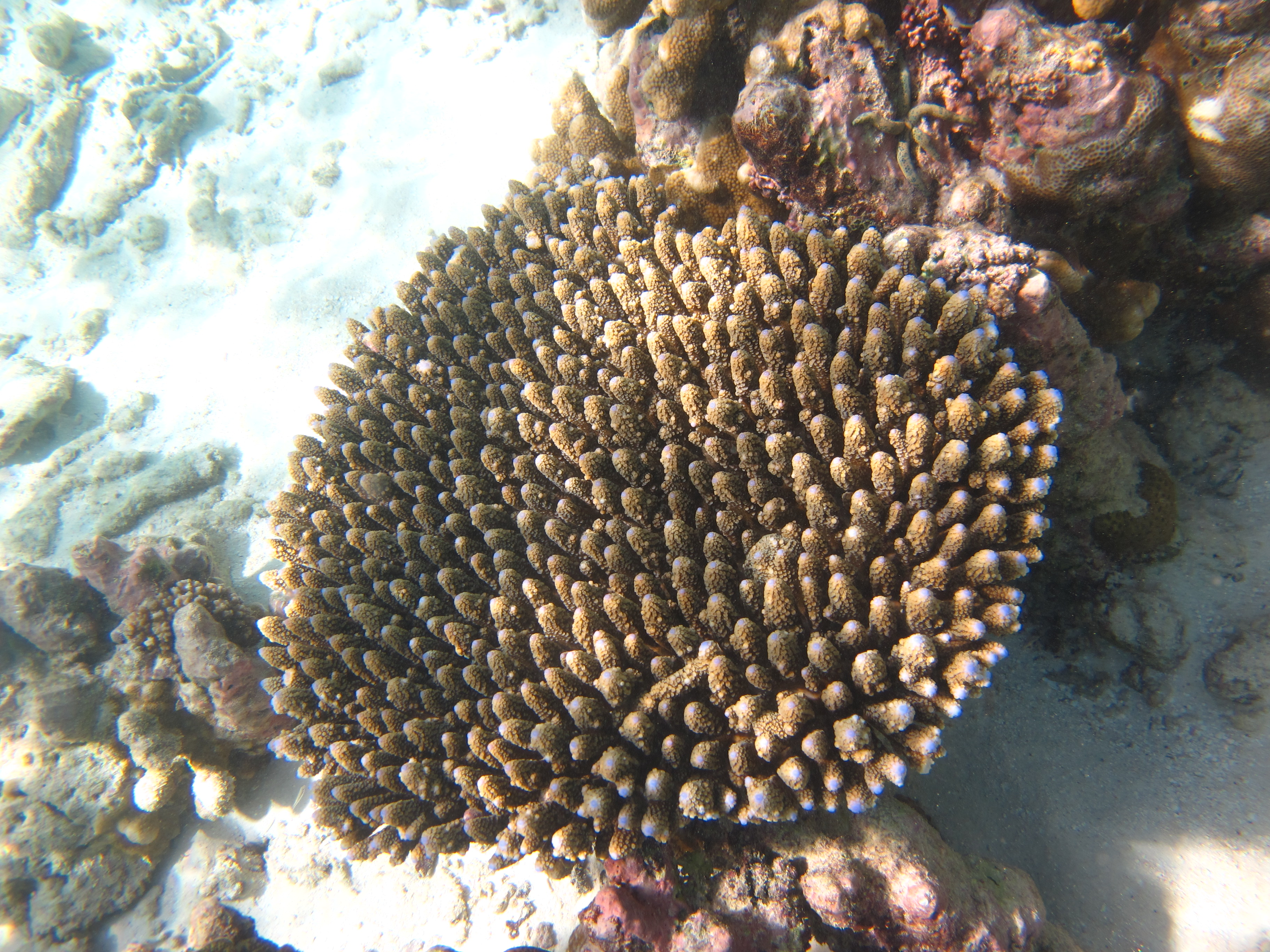
- Acropora digitifera in Maldives.

Conservation status
- Near Threatened (IUCN 3.1)

Scientific classification
- Kingdom: Animalia
- Phylum: Cnidaria
- Subphylum: Anthozoa
- Class: Hexacorallia
- Order: Scleractinia
- Family: Acroporidae
- Genus: Acropora
- Species: A. digitifera

Binomial name
- Acropora digitifera (Dana, 1846)

Synonyms
- List: Acropora baeodactyla (Brook, 1892); Acropora brevicollis (Brook, 1892); Acropora leptocyathus (Brook, 1891); Acropora pyramidalis (Klunzinger, 1879); Acropora schmitti Wells, 1950; Acropora wardii Verrill, 1902; Madrepora baeodactyla Brook, 1892; Madrepora brevicollis Brook, 1892; Madrepora digitifera Dana, 1846; Madrepora leptocyathus Brook, 1891; Madrepora pyramidalis Klunzinger, 1879

= Acropora digitifera =

Species of coral

Acropora digitifera is a species of acroporid coral found in the Gulf of Aden, the Red Sea, the southwest and northern Indian Ocean, Australia, Southeast Asia, the central Indo-Pacific, Japan, the west Pacific Ocean and the East China Sea. It is found in shallow areas of tropical reefs in the back margins, from depths of 0 to 12 m. It was described by James Dwight Dana in 1846.

== Description ==
It occurs in colonies consisting of either prostrate or upright groups of branches; colonies have diameters of up to 1 metre (39 in). Its thin branches contain long axial corallites which are tube-shaped, and radial corallites are tube- or pocket-shaped and small. This coral is a digitate coral, with an elongated terminal corallite and often a blue tip. It looks like Acropora humilis but is smaller, with branching finger-like lobes. It is red-brown in colour and has either white or blue axial corallites. It also looks similar to Acropora filiformis.

== Distribution ==
It is classed as a near threatened species on the IUCN Red List; it is believed that its population is decreasing, and it is listed under Appendix II of CITES. Figures of its population are unknown, but is likely to be threatened by the global reduction of coral reefs, the increase of temperature causing coral bleaching, climate change, human activity, the crown-of-thorns starfish (Acanthaster planci) and disease. This coral can be found in the Gulf of Aden, the Red Sea, the northern and southwestern Indian Ocean, the central Indo-Pacific, southeast Asia, Australia, Japan, the west Pacific Ocean and the East China Sea. It is also found in the Pitcairn Islands.

== Taxonomy ==
It was first described as Madrepora digitifera by Dana in 1846.

== Gallery ==
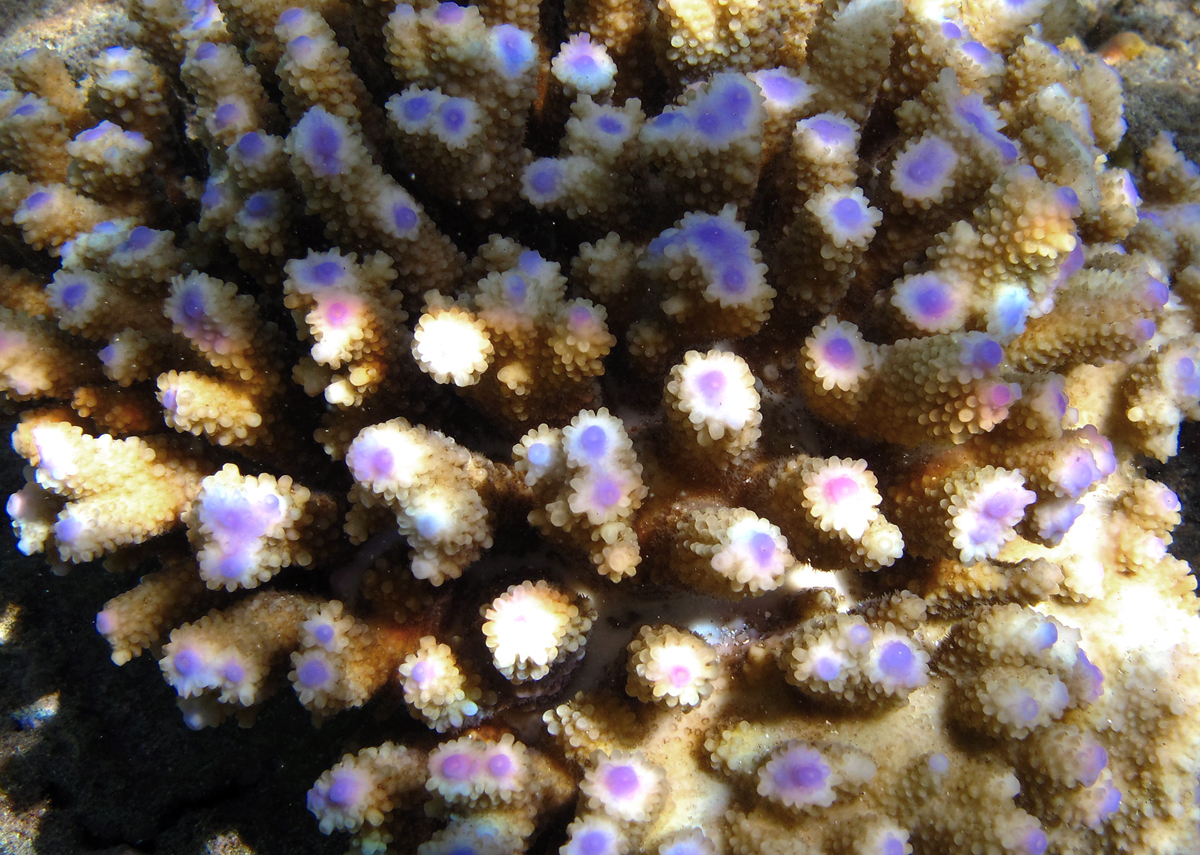
Acropora digitifera in Réunion island

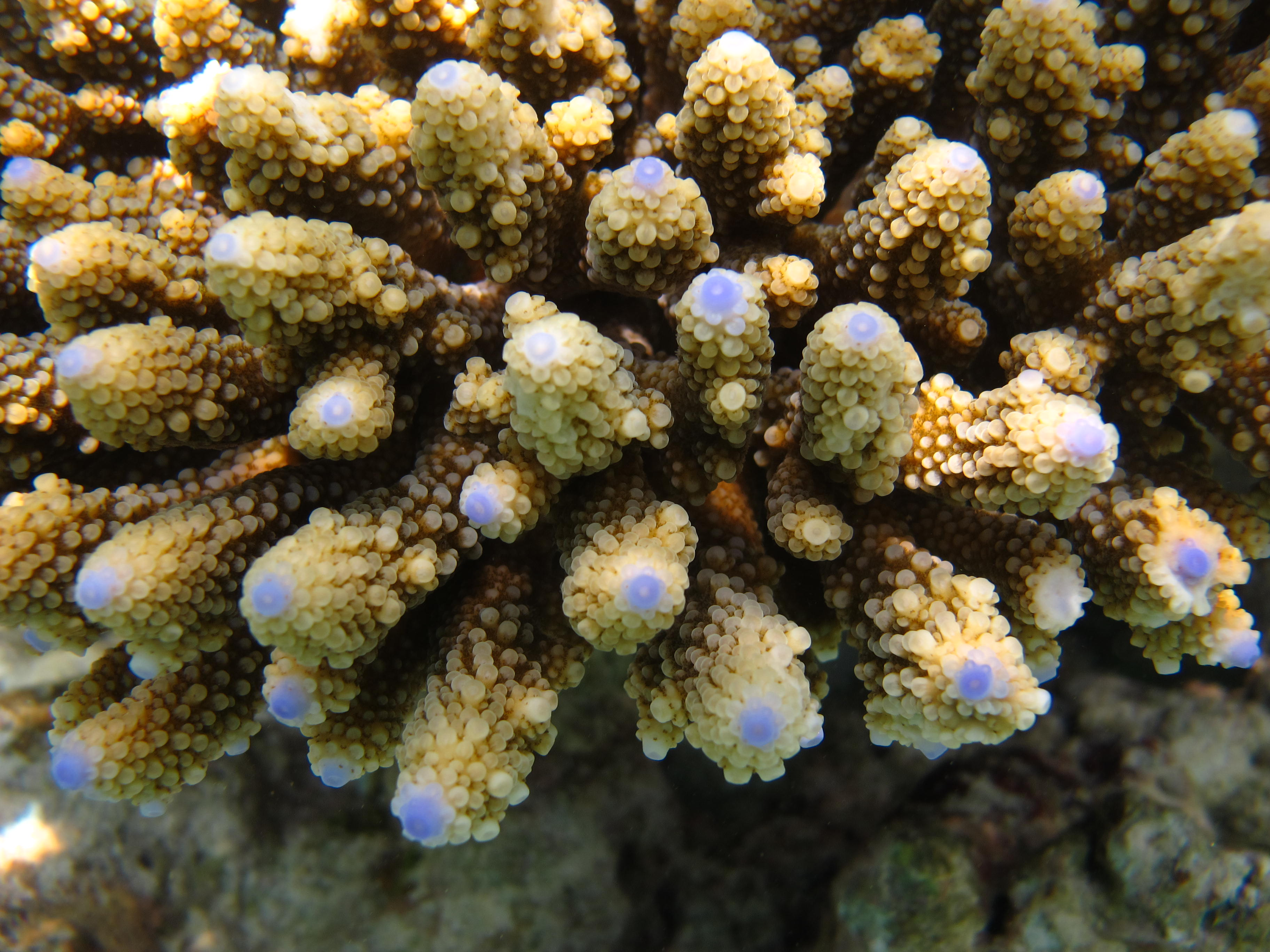
In Maldives

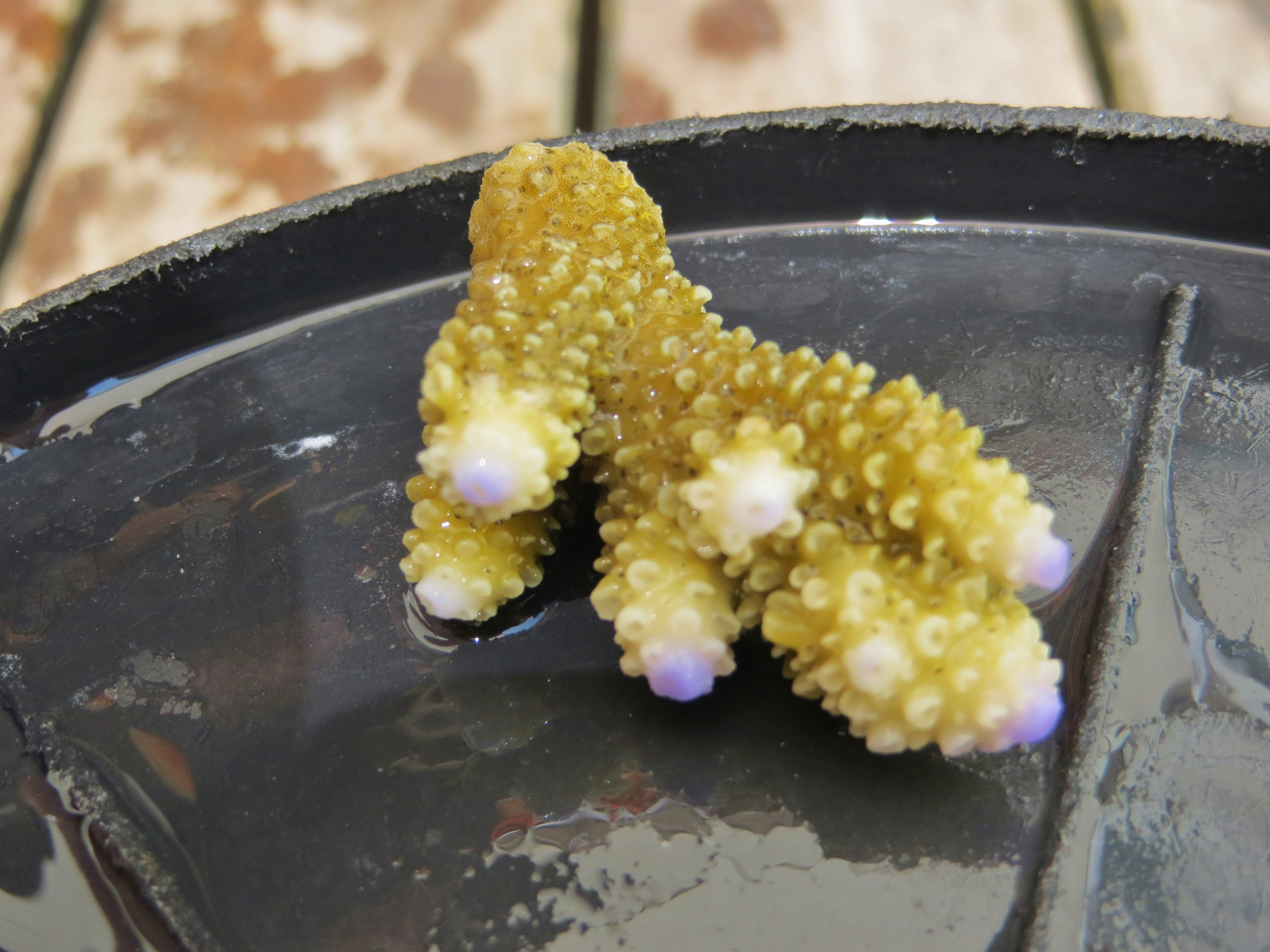
Close-up on the corallites.
