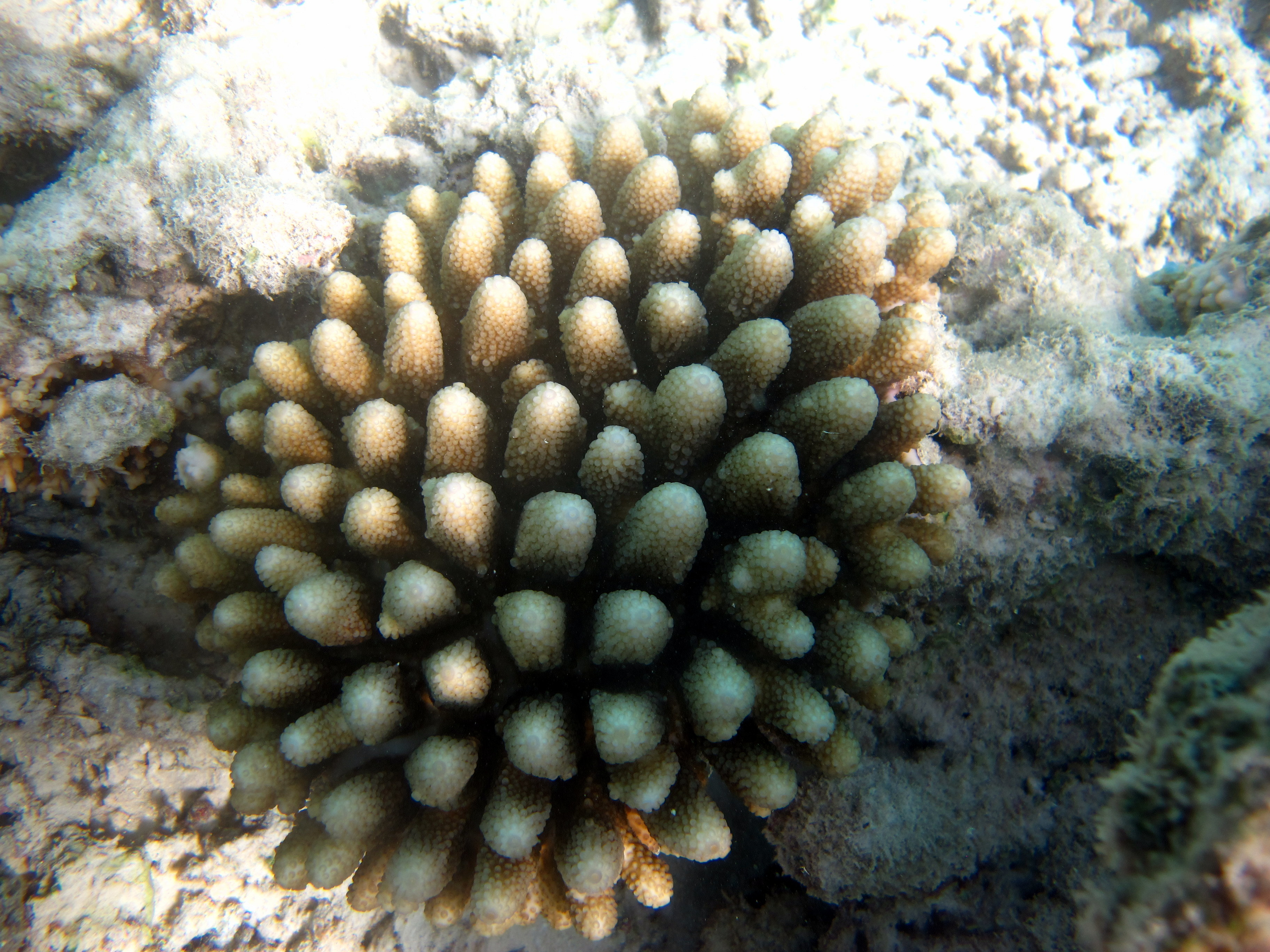

Conservation status
- Endangered (IUCN 3.1)

Scientific classification
- Kingdom: Animalia
- Phylum: Cnidaria
- Subphylum: Anthozoa
- Class: Hexacorallia
- Order: Scleractinia
- Family: Acroporidae
- Genus: Acropora
- Species: A. monticulosa

Binomial name
- Acropora monticulosa (Brüggemann, 1879)

Synonyms
- Madrepora monticulosa Brüggemann, 1879

= Acropora monticulosa =

Species of coral

Acropora monticulosa is a species of acroporid coral found in the southwest and northern Indian Ocean, the central Indo-Pacific, Australia, Southeast Asia, Japan, the East China Sea and the oceanic west Pacific Ocean. It is also found in the Tuamotus. It occurs in tropical shallow reefs on upper slopes, from depths of 1 to 12 metres (3 ft 3 in to 39 ft 4 in). It was described by Brüggemann in 1879.

== Description ==
The species occurs in colonies with diameters over 3 metres (9.8 ft) in dome-shaped structures. Its digitate colonies contain thick branches that contain a single axial corallite on the end, which the branches taper to. Its radial corallites are uniformly arranged and sized. Acropora monticulosa is cream or blue in colour and has a similar appearance to Acropora globiceps and Acropora retusa.

== Distribution ==
It is classed as an endangered species on the IUCN Red List and it is believed that its population is decreasing; the species is also listed under Appendix II of CITES. Figures of its population are unknown, but is likely to be threatened by the global reduction of coral reefs, the increase of temperature causing coral bleaching, climate change, human activity, the crown-of-thorns starfish (Acanthaster planci) and disease. The species occurs in the northern and southwestern Indian Ocean, the central Indo-Pacific, Australia, Southeast Asia, Japan, the East China Sea and the oceanic west Pacific Ocean; it also occurs in the Tuamotus. The species is found at depths of between 1 and 12 metres (3 ft 3 in and 39 ft 4 in) in tropical shallow reefs on upper slopes.

== Taxonomy ==
It was described as Madrepora monticulosa by Brüggemann in 1879.
