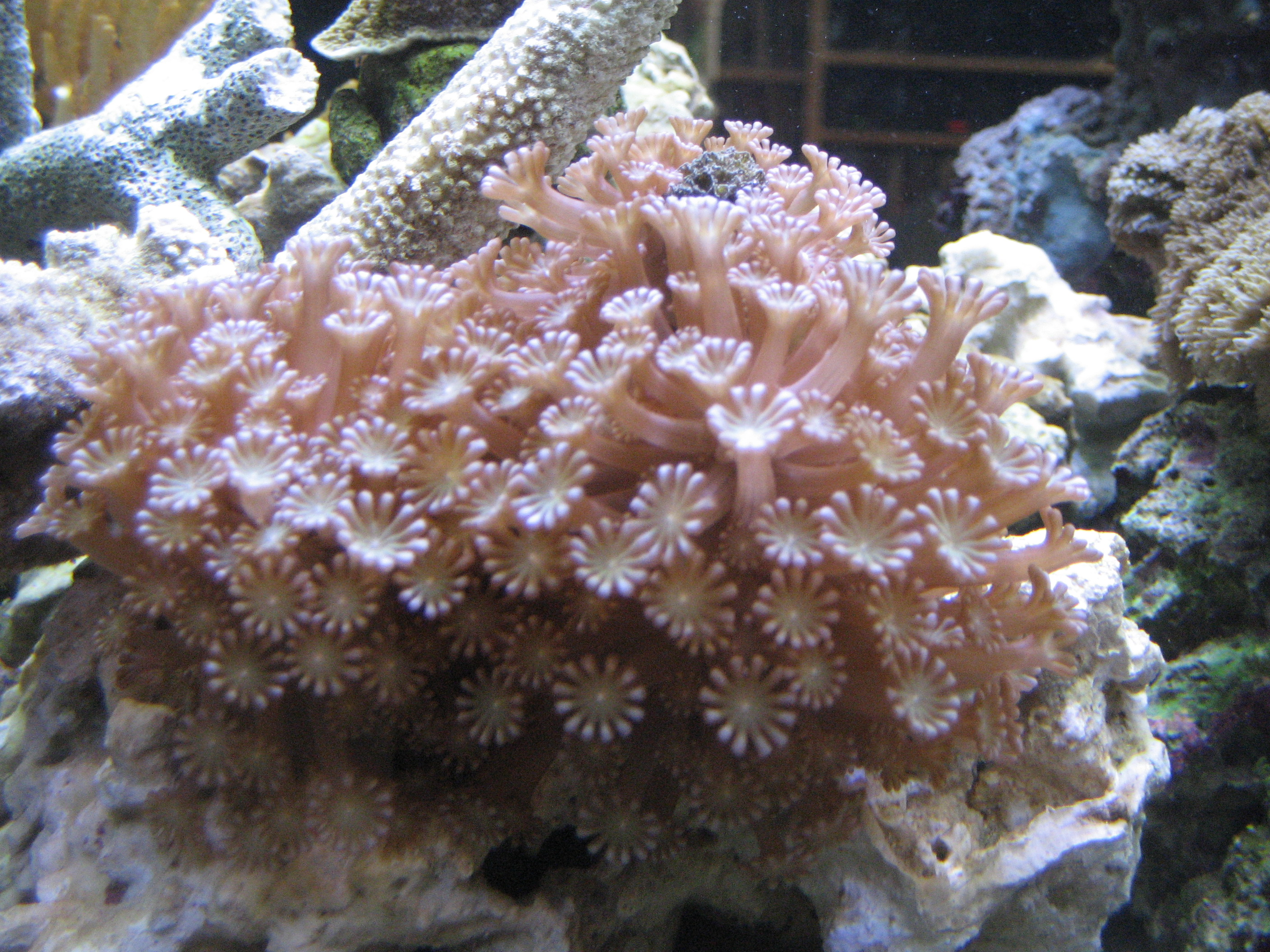
- Alveopora sp.

Scientific classification
- Kingdom: Animalia
- Phylum: Cnidaria
- Subphylum: Anthozoa
- Class: Hexacorallia
- Order: Scleractinia
- Family: Acroporidae
- Genus: Alveopora; Blainville, 1830

= Alveopora =

Genus of corals

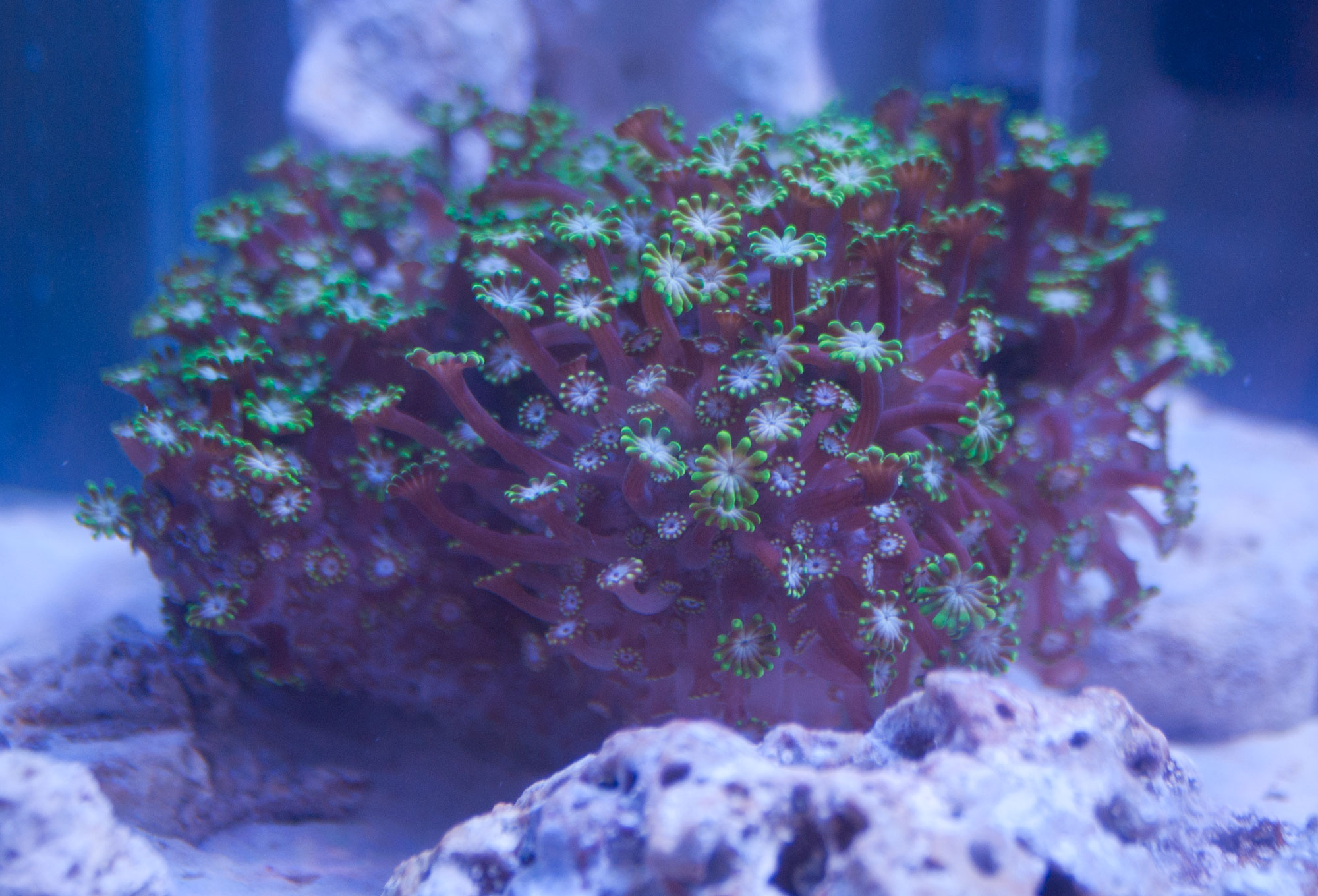
Alveopora spongiosa

Alveopora is a genus of colonial stony corals in the family Acroporidae. Members of this genus are native to the Indo-Pacific region and are often found on reef slopes in turbid water. They are generally uncommon.

== Characteristics ==
Alveopora has a very light and porous skeleton consisting of interconnecting rods and spines. The colonies are either massive or branching and often have irregular shapes. The corallites have walls that are very perforated and septa that are mostly composed of fine spines which may meet in the centre forming a tangle of the columella. The polyps are large and fleshy and are normally extended both day and night. They have twelve tentacles, often with swollen knob-like tips. They have symbiotic zooxanthellae in their tissues and are usually white, pale grey, cream or light brown, sometimes with contrasting coloured tentacles.

== Species ==
This genus contains the following species:

- Alveopora allingi Hoffmeister, 1925
- Alveopora catalai Wells, 1968
- Alveopora daedalea (Forsskål, 1775)
- Alveopora excelsa Verrill, 1864
- Alveopora fenestrata (Lamarck, 1816)
- Alveopora gigas Veron, 1985
- Alveopora japonica Eguchi, 1968
- Alveopora marionensis Veron & Pichon, 1982
- Alveopora minuta Veron, 2000
- Alveopora noamiae Nemenzo, 1979
- Alveopora ocellata Wells, 1954
- Alveopora simplex
- Alveopora spongiosa Dana, 1846
- Alveopora superficialis Pillai & Scheer, 1976
- Alveopora tizardi Bassett-Smith, 1890
- Alveopora verrilliana Dana, 1846
- Alveopora viridis (Quoy & Gaimard, 1833)
