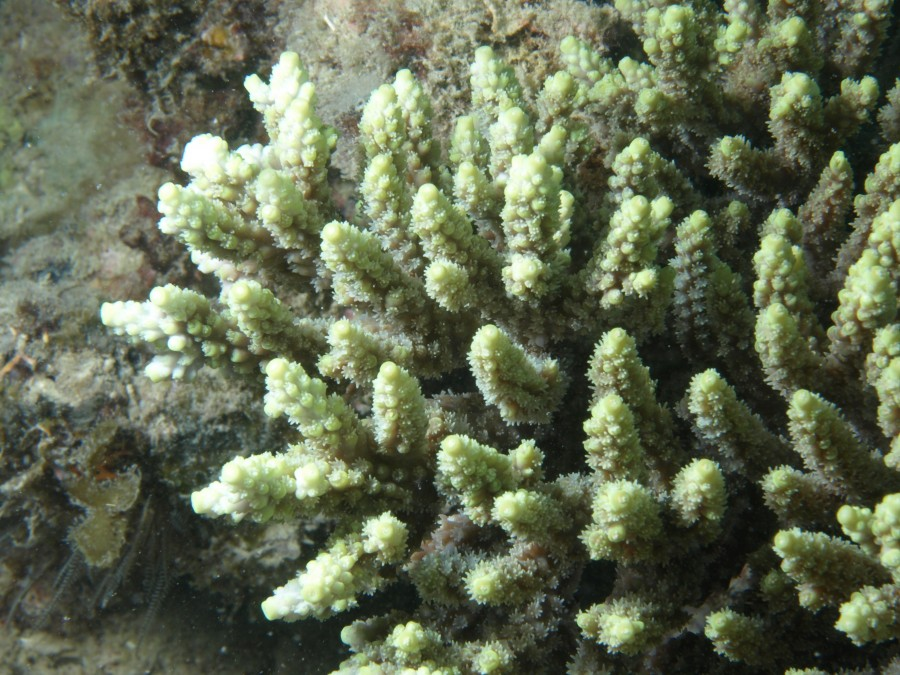

Conservation status
- Endangered (IUCN 3.1)

Scientific classification
- Kingdom: Animalia
- Phylum: Cnidaria
- Subphylum: Anthozoa
- Class: Hexacorallia
- Order: Scleractinia
- Family: Acroporidae
- Genus: Acropora
- Species: A. aculeus

Binomial name
- Acropora aculeus (Dana, 1846)

Synonyms
- Madrepora aculeus Dana, 1846

= Acropora aculeus =

Species of coral

Acropora aculeus is a species of acroporid corals found throughout the Indian Ocean, the central Indo-Pacific, Australia, south-eastern Asia, Japan and the East China Sea. It is also present in the western Pacific Ocean. It is an uncommon species and is particularly prone to coral bleaching, disease, and crown-of-thorns starfish predation; it is also harvested for use in aquaria, and the International Union for Conservation of Nature has assessed it as being a "endangered species". Habitat loss is a large concern.

== Description ==
Acropora aculeus forms corymbose, pillow-like structures, the horizontal branches being slender and spreading while the upright branches are narrow and shorter. The corallites are distinctive, longer than they are wide, smooth and polished. This coral is usually yellowish or grey, but can be bright bluish-green, and the tips of the branches are often yellow, pale blue, green or brown. It is usually yellow on the Great Barrier Reef and in the Philippines, but pale brown in western Australia. It is named as ACR ACUL in Coral Codes.

== Distribution and habitat ==
Acropora aculeus is native to the Indo-Pacific region, its range extending from the east coast of Africa and Madagascar to Taiwan, Japan, Indonesia, Australia and some island groups in the eastern Pacific Ocean. It is endemic to the Philippines distributed in Samoa, Great Barrier Reef, Sri Lanka, Vietnam, and the Marshall Islands. It occurs at depths between about 5 and 20 m (16 and 66 ft) or even deeper. It is found on all parts of the reef, particularly the front slope, and also in lagoons. Its form varies with its degree of exposure to wave action, being more massive in exposed locations and more pillow-like in lagoons.

== Status ==
The reefs on which Acropora aculeus lives are under threat from global warming, increased ocean acidification and reef destruction. It is a generally uncommon species of coral and is particularly susceptible to bleaching and coral diseases. The International Union for Conservation of Nature has assessed its conservation status as being "endangered", considering that 37% of the colonies may be lost in the next thirty years (three generation lengths).
