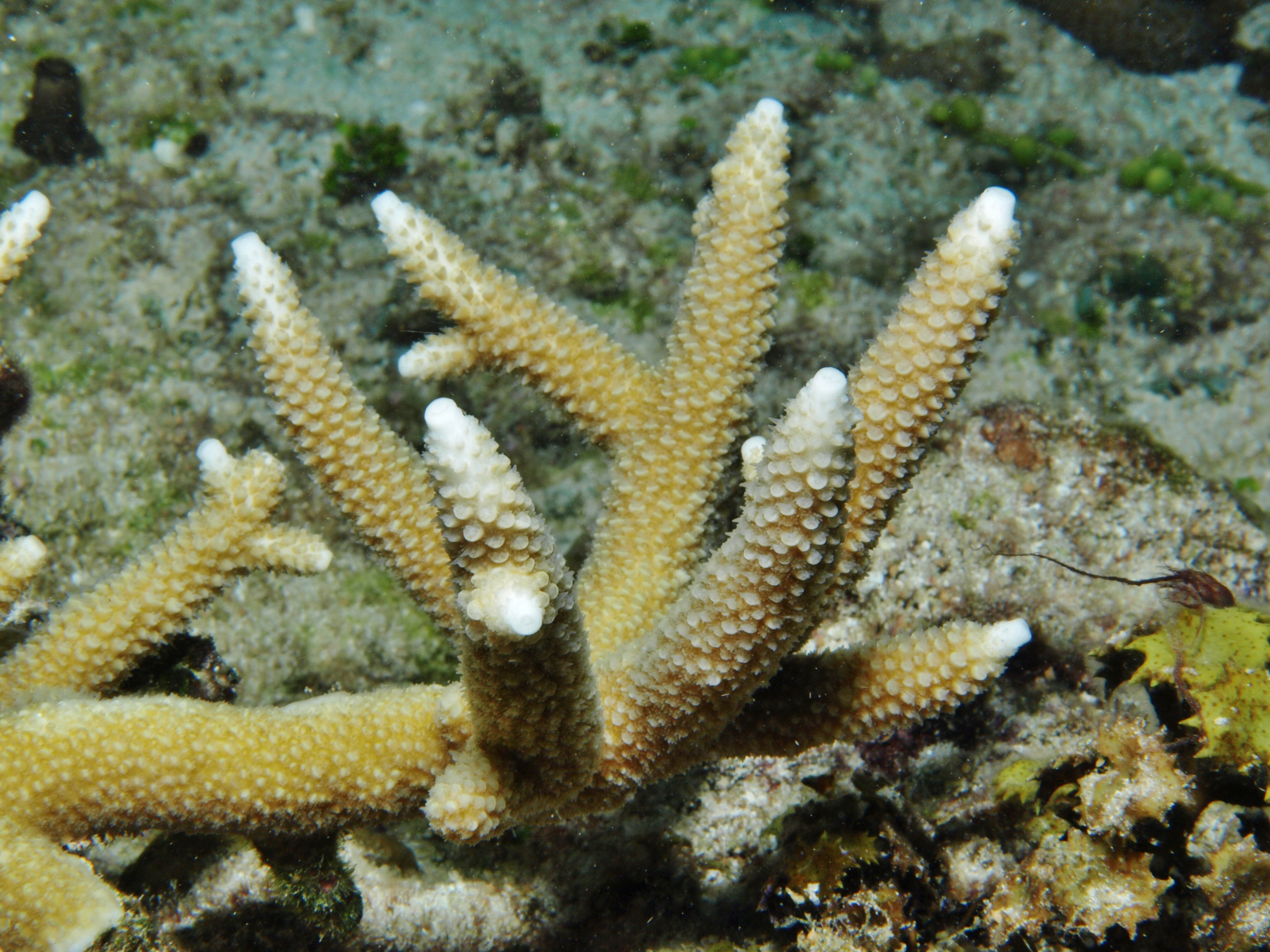

Conservation status
- Endangered (IUCN 3.1)
- CITES Appendix II (CITES)

Scientific classification
- Kingdom: Animalia
- Phylum: Cnidaria
- Subphylum: Anthozoa
- Class: Hexacorallia
- Order: Scleractinia
- Family: Acroporidae
- Genus: Acropora
- Species: A. verweyi

Binomial name
- Acropora verweyi Veron & Wallace, 1984

= Acropora verweyi =

Species of coral

Acropora verweyi is a species of acroporid coral found in the southwest and northern Indian Ocean, the central Indo-Pacific, Australia, southeast Asia, Japan, the East China Sea and the oceanic western Pacific Ocean. It is also found in the Philippines, American Samoa, Fiji and Rodrigues. It occurs in tropical shallow reefs on upper slopes, from depths of 2 to 15 metres (6 ft 7 in to 49 ft 3 in).

== Taxonomy ==
Acropora verweyi was described in 1984 by Veron and Carden Wallace.

== Description ==
It is found in encrusted colonies arranged in cushion-, plate-shaped, or corymbose structures. Its branches are short and have diameters of seven to nine millimetres and contain very short branchlets growing near their bases. Its axial corallites are obvious and its radial corallites are appressed, tube-shaped, orderly arranged, and round. The species is a mostly a cream-brown colour and its axial corallites are yellow.

== Distribution ==
It is classed as an endangered species on the IUCN Red List and it is believed that its population is decreasing in line with the global decline in coral reefs; the species is also listed under Appendix II of CITES. Figures of its population are unknown, but is likely to be threatened by the global reduction of coral reefs, the increase of temperature causing coral bleaching, climate change, human activity, the crown-of-thorns starfish and disease. It occurs in the southwest and northern Indian Ocean, the central Indo-Pacific, Australia, southeast Asia, Japan, the East China Sea and the oceanic western Pacific Ocean. It is found at depths of between 1 and 29 metres (3 ft 3 in and 95 ft 2 in) in tropical shallow reefs on upper slopes.
