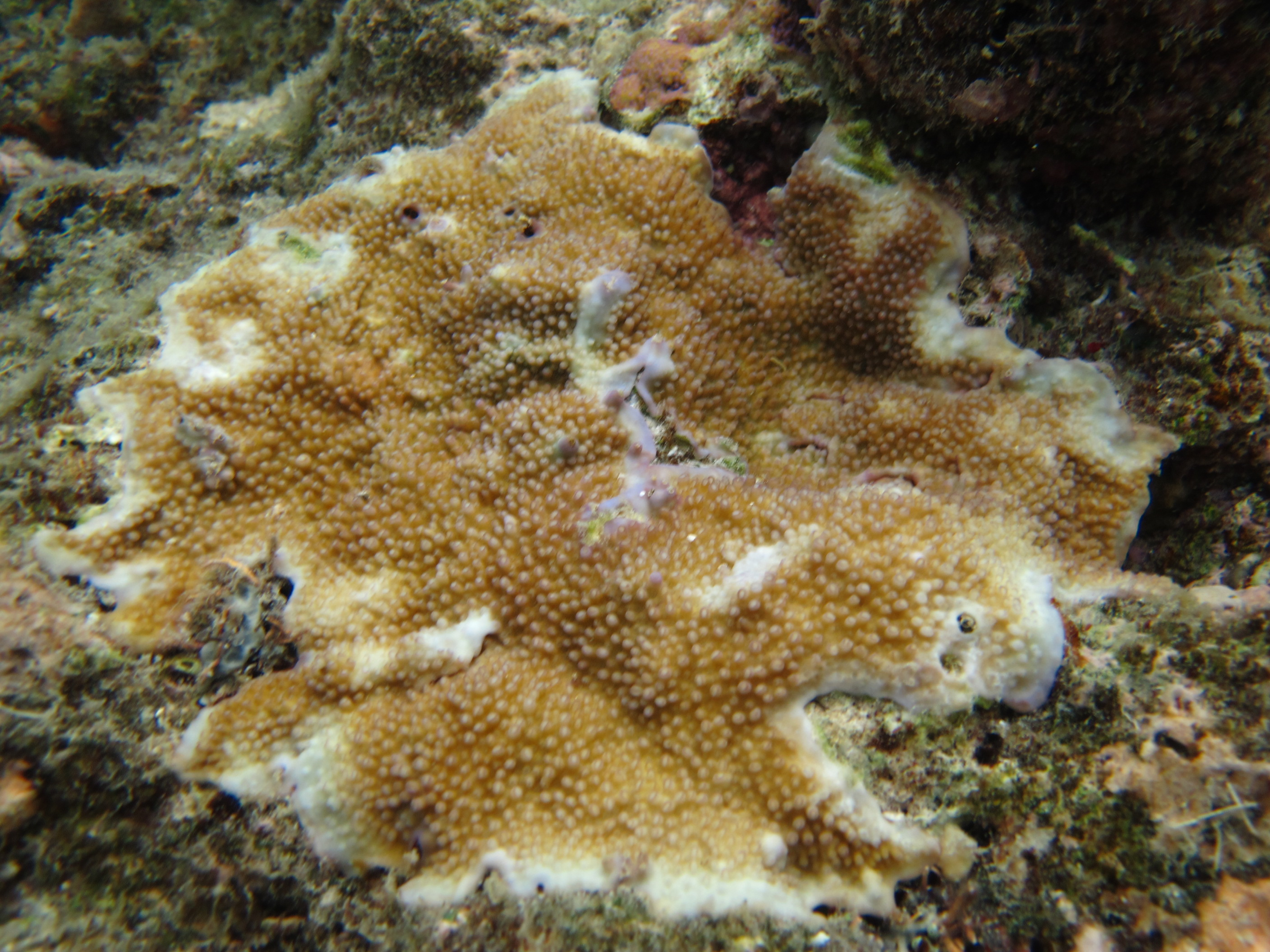

Conservation status
- Endangered (IUCN 3.1)

Scientific classification
- Kingdom: Animalia
- Phylum: Cnidaria
- Subphylum: Anthozoa
- Class: Hexacorallia
- Order: Scleractinia
- Family: Acroporidae
- Genus: Acropora
- Species: A. palmerae

Binomial name
- Acropora palmerae Wells, 1954

Synonyms
- Acropora minuta Veron, 2000

= Acropora palmerae =

Species of coral

Acropora palmerae is a species of acroporid coral found in the northern Indian Ocean, the central Indo-Pacific, Australia, Southeast Asia, Japan, the East China Sea and the oceanic west Pacific Ocean. It is also found in Palau and the Mariana Islands, American Samoa, the Andaman Islands, the Great Barrier Reef, Okinawa Island, Mauritius, Micronesia, the Cook Islands and the Philippines. It occurs in tropical shallow reefs on flats exposed the action of strong waves and in lagoons, from depths of 0 to 12 metres (0 to 39 ft). It was described by Wells in 1954.

== Description ==
It occurs in encrusted colonies containing irregular branches; these colonies sometimes reach diameters of over 1 metre (3 ft 3 in). Its axial corallites are obvious but inconsistent, and it has mainly rasp-like radial corallites. The species is pink- or green-brown in colour. It looks similar to Acropora pinguis.

== Distribution ==
It is classed as an endangered species on the IUCN Red List and it is believed that its population is decreasing; the species is also listed under Appendix II of CITES. Figures of its population are unknown, but is likely to be threatened by the global reduction of coral reefs, the increase of temperature causing coral bleaching, climate change, human activity, the crown-of-thorns starfish (Acanthaster planci) and disease. It occurs in the northern Indian Ocean, the central Indo-Pacific, Australia, Southeast Asia, Japan, the East China Sea and the oceanic west Pacific Ocean; it also occurs in Palau and the Mariana Islands, American Samoa, the Andaman Islands, the Great Barrier Reef, Okinawa Island, Mauritius, Micronesia, the Cook Islands and the Philippines. It is found at depths of between 0 and 12 metres (0 and 39 ft) in tropical shallow reefs on exposed flats or in lagoons.

== Taxonomy ==
It was described as Acropora palmerae by Wells in 1954.
