= Alveopora verrilliana =

Conservation status
- Endangered (IUCN 3.1)

Scientific classification
- Kingdom: Animalia
- Phylum: Cnidaria
- Subphylum: Anthozoa
- Class: Hexacorallia
- Order: Scleractinia
- Family: Acroporidae
- Genus: Alveopora
- Species: A. verrilliana

Binomial name
- Alveopora verrilliana Dana, 1872

Species of coral

Alveopora verrilliana is a species of stony coral that is found in the Red Sea, the Gulf of Aden, the northern Indian Ocean, the central Indo-Pacific, Australia, Southeast Asia, Japan, the East China Sea, the oceanic west and central Pacific Ocean and the Johnston Atoll. It can also be found in Palau and the southern Mariana Islands. It grows on shallow coral reefs to a depth of 30 metres (100 ft). It is particularly susceptible to coral bleaching and is harvested for the aquarium trade.

== Description ==
Colonies of Alveopora verrilliana are composed of a number of irregularly arranged lobes. The corallites are up to 2 millimetres (0.08 in) in diameter, and the septa bear short, blunt spines. The corallite wall has a thicket of vertical spines. The colonies are usually greenish-brown, dark brown or grey, sometimes with contrasting pale oral surfaces or tentacle tips.

== Biology ==
Alveopora verrilliana is a zooxanthellate species of coral. It obtains most of its nutritional needs from the symbiotic dinoflagellates that live inside its soft tissues. These photosynthetic organisms provide the coral with organic carbon and nitrogen, sometimes providing up to 90% of their host's energy needs for metabolism and growth. Its remaining needs are met by the planktonic organisms caught by the tentacles of the polyps.

== Status ==
This coral has a widespread distribution but is relatively uncommon. It is particularly susceptible to coral bleaching. It is an attractive small coral and is harvested by the reef aquarium trade. All corals receive protection by being listed on CITES Appendix II. The main threats faced by corals are related to climate change; the mechanical destruction of their coral reef habitats, increasing damage from extreme weather events, rising sea water temperatures and ocean acidification. The International Union for Conservation of Nature has assessed the conservation status of this species as being "endangered".
