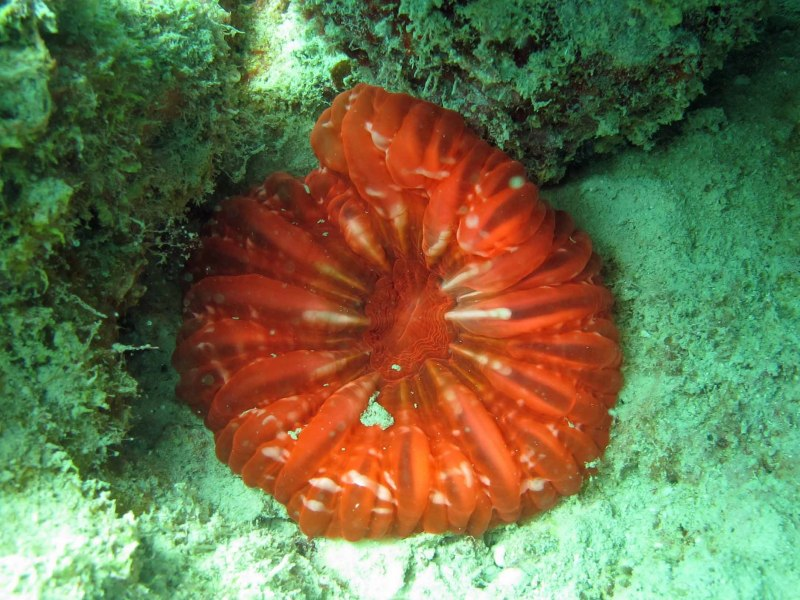

Conservation status
- Endangered (IUCN 3.1)

Scientific classification
- Kingdom: Animalia
- Phylum: Cnidaria
- Subphylum: Anthozoa
- Class: Hexacorallia
- Order: Scleractinia
- Family: Acroporidae
- Genus: Alveopora
- Species: A. fenestrata

Binomial name
- Alveopora fenestrata (Lamarck, 1816)

Synonyms
- Alveopora retusa Verrill, 1864; Pocillopora fenestrata Lamarck, 1816

= Alveopora fenestrata =

Species of coral

Alveopora fenestrata is a species of stony coral that is found in the Red Sea, the Gulf of Aden, the southwest and northern Indian Ocean, the central Indo-Pacific, Australia, Southeast Asia and the oceanic west Pacific Ocean. It can be found in shallow coral reefs, to a depth of 30 metres (100 ft). It is particularly susceptible to coral bleaching.

== Description ==
Colonies of Alveopora fenestrata are generally hemispherical in form with a number of short irregular lobes. The polyps are crowded together, elongated, with a crown of long tentacles, giving the appearance of a mop head. The corallite walls are composed of compacted spines and rods, and the septa have long, tapering spines which are joined together low in the corallite. The colonies are usually greyish or greenish-brown.

== Biology ==
Alveopora fenestrata is a zooxanthellate species of coral. It obtains most of its nutritional needs from the symbiotic dinoflagellates that live inside its soft tissues. These photosynthetic organisms provide the coral with organic carbon and nitrogen, sometimes providing up to 90% of their host's energy needs for metabolism and growth. Its remaining needs are met by the planktonic organisms caught by the tentacles of the polyps.

== Status ==
This coral is widespread but is relatively uncommon. It is susceptible to coral bleaching but not particularly prone to coral diseases. It is an attractive small coral and is harvested by the reef aquarium trade. All corals receive protection by being listed on CITES Appendix II. The main threats faced by corals are related to climate change; the mechanical destruction of their coral reef habitats, increasing damage from extreme weather events, rising sea water temperatures and ocean acidification. The International Union for Conservation of Nature has assessed the conservation status of this species as being "endangered".
