= Acropora tenella =

Conservation status
- Least Concern (IUCN 3.1)

Scientific classification
- Kingdom: Animalia
- Phylum: Cnidaria
- Subphylum: Anthozoa
- Class: Hexacorallia
- Order: Scleractinia
- Family: Acroporidae
- Genus: Acropora
- Species: A. tenella

Binomial name
- Acropora tenella (Brook, 1892)

Synonyms
- Acropora eibli Pillai & Scheer, 1976; Madrepora tenella Brook, 1892

Species of coral

Acropora tenella is a species of acroporid coral found in the central Indo-Pacific, southeast Asia, Japan, the East China Sea and the oceanic western Pacific Ocean. It occurs on lower slopes of reefs at depths of 25 to 70 metres (82 to 230 ft).

== Taxonomy ==
It was described by Brook in 1892 as Madrepora tenella. It is also known under its synonym of Acropora eibli, which it was described under by Pillai and Scheer in 1976.

== Description ==
It occurs in colonies with plate-like structures arranged horizontally. Its branches are flattened and often diverge; they often contain broad central ridges. Its axial corallites are distinct; it has radial corallites that are distinct and are laterally present on some older branches but are generally placed irregularly over the branches. The coral is cream in colour and its branches have either blue or white ends.

== Distribution ==
It occurs in the central Indo-Pacific, southeast Asia, Japan, the East China Sea and the oceanic western Pacific Ocean. The species is found at depths of between 25 and 70 metres (82 and 230 ft) on the lower slopes of reefs.
