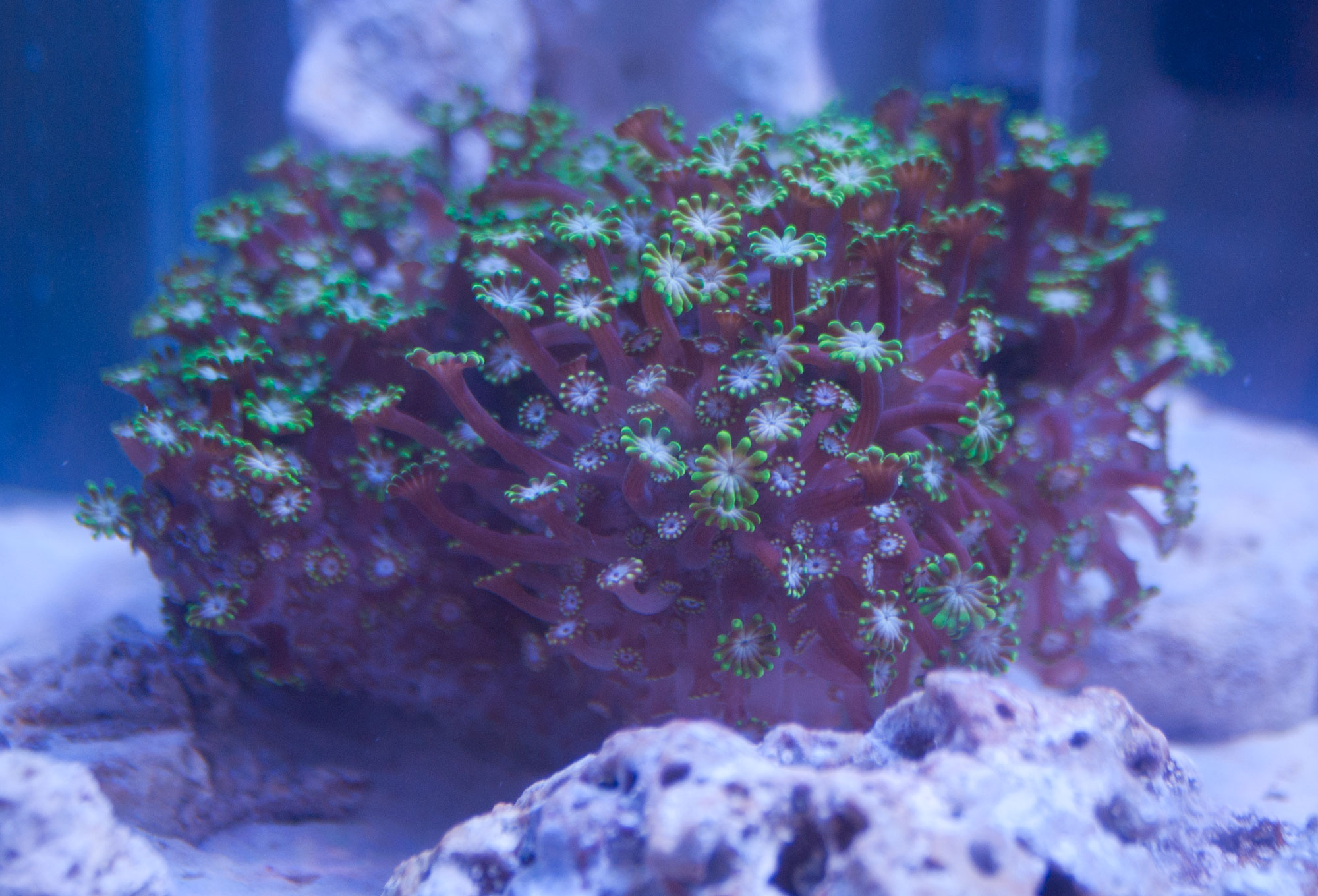

Conservation status
- Vulnerable (IUCN 3.1)

Scientific classification
- Kingdom: Animalia
- Phylum: Cnidaria
- Subphylum: Anthozoa
- Class: Hexacorallia
- Order: Scleractinia
- Family: Acroporidae
- Genus: Alveopora
- Species: A. spongiosa

Binomial name
- Alveopora spongiosa Dana, 1846

Synonyms
- Alveopora alcalai Nemenzo, 1976; Alveopora fijiensis Hoffmeister, 1932; Alveopora regularis Thiel, 1932

= Alveopora spongiosa =

Species of coral

Alveopora spongiosa is a species of stony coral that is found in the Red Sea, the Gulf of Aden, the southwest and northern Indian Ocean, the central Indo-Pacific, Australia, Southeast Asia Japan, the East China Sea and the oceanic west and central Pacific Ocean. It can be found on protected upper coral reef slopes, generally from depth of 9–20 m (30–66 ft), but can grow at depths of up to 50 m (160 ft). It is moderately susceptible to coral bleaching, and is harvested for the aquarium trade.

== Description ==
Colonies of Alveopora spongiosa take various forms; they may be submassive plates or cushions, or be columnar or encrusting, sometimes reaching a diameter of 2 metres (10 ft). The septa on the corallite walls bear slender tapering spines of various lengths which do not connect together. The polyps may have two whorls of knobbed tentacles, six long ones and six short. The colonies are usually some shade of brown, sometimes with white tips to the tentacles.

== Biology ==
Alveopora spongiosa is a zooxanthellate species of coral. It obtains most of its nutritional needs from the symbiotic dinoflagellates that live inside its soft tissues. These photosynthetic organisms provide the coral with organic carbon and nitrogen, sometimes providing up to 90% of their host's energy needs for metabolism and growth. Its remaining needs are met by the planktonic organisms caught by the tentacles of the polyps.

== Status ==
This coral is moderately susceptible to coral bleaching but less so than related species that occur in shallower water. It is an attractive small coral and is collected by the reef aquarium trade. All corals receive protection by being listed on CITES Appendix II. The main threats faced by corals are related to climate change; the mechanical destruction of their coral reef habitats, increasing damage from extreme weather events, rising sea water temperatures and ocean acidification. It has a wide range and is locally common, and the International Union for Conservation of Nature has assessed the conservation status of this species as being "vulnerable".
