= Acropora lovelli =

Conservation status
- Endangered (IUCN 3.1)

Scientific classification
- Kingdom: Animalia
- Phylum: Cnidaria
- Subphylum: Anthozoa
- Class: Hexacorallia
- Order: Scleractinia
- Family: Acroporidae
- Genus: Acropora
- Species: A. lovelli

Binomial name
- Acropora lovelli Veron & Wallas, 1984

Species of coral

Acropora lovelli is a species of acroporid coral found in the northern Indian Ocean, the central Indo-Pacific, Australia and the oceanic west Pacific Ocean. It can also be found in Palau and the southern Mariana Islands, the Red Sea, Mauritius, Tuha'a Pae, the Pitcairn Islands and Rodrigues. It occurs in shallow tropical reefs, in shallow protected lagoons and at lagoon entrances, to depths from 1–10 m.

== Description ==
Colonies of Acropora lovelli have a branching structure and may be bluish-white with blue tips to the stubby side branches. It has been grown in mariculture.

== Biology ==
Acropora lovelli is a zooxanthellate species of coral. It obtains most of its nutritional needs from the symbiotic dinoflagellates that live inside its soft tissues. These photosynthetic organisms provide the coral with organic carbon and nitrogen, sometimes providing up to 90% of their host's energy needs for metabolism and growth. Its remaining needs are met by the planktonic organisms caught by the tentacles of the polyps.

== Status ==
Acropora lovelli is an uncommon species with a patchy distribution. It is particularly susceptible to coral bleaching and to coral diseases, as well as being prone to attack by the crown-of-thorns starfish (Acanthaster planci). The main threats faced by corals are related to climate change; the mechanical destruction of their coral reef habitats, increasing damage from extreme weather events, rising sea water temperatures and ocean acidification. The International Union for Conservation of Nature has assessed the conservation status of this species as being an endangered species. All corals receive protection by being listed on CITES Appendix II.
