= Alveopora viridis =

Conservation status
- Vulnerable (IUCN 3.1)

Scientific classification
- Kingdom: Animalia
- Phylum: Cnidaria
- Subphylum: Anthozoa
- Class: Hexacorallia
- Order: Scleractinia
- Family: Acroporidae
- Genus: Alveopora
- Species: A. viridis

Binomial name
- Alveopora viridis Quoy & Gaimard, 1833

Species of coral

Alveopora viridis is a species of stony coral that has a highly disjunct range, and can be found in the Red Sea, the Gulf of Aden, the northern Indian Ocean and in Palau and the Mariana Islands. It is found on lower coral reef slopes to depths of 50 m (160 ft). It is particularly susceptible to coral bleaching and is harvested for the aquarium trade.

== Description ==
Colonies of Alveopora viridis are submassive or columnar. The corallites are very small and the septa bear spines of two different lengths. The colonies are usually some shade of greyish-brown or greenish-brown.

== Biology ==
Alveopora viridis is a zooxanthellate species of coral. It obtains most of its nutritional needs from the symbiotic dinoflagellates that live inside its soft tissues. These photosynthetic organisms provide the coral with organic carbon and nitrogen, sometimes providing up to 90% of their host's energy needs for metabolism and growth. The remaining needs of the colony are met from the assimilation of planktonic organisms caught by the tentacles of the polyps.

== Status ==
This coral is particularly susceptible to coral bleaching and it is harvested for the reef aquarium trade. All corals receive protection by being listed on CITES Appendix II. The main threats faced by corals are related to climate change; the mechanical destruction of their coral reef habitats, increasing damage from extreme weather events, rising sea water temperatures and ocean acidification. Alveopora viridis has a wide range but has a number of separate subpopulations and is generally uncommon. The International Union for Conservation of Nature has assessed its conservation status as being "vulnerable".
