= Acropora striata =

Conservation status
- Endangered (IUCN 3.1)

Scientific classification
- Kingdom: Animalia
- Phylum: Cnidaria
- Subphylum: Anthozoa
- Class: Hexacorallia
- Order: Scleractinia
- Family: Acroporidae
- Genus: Acropora
- Species: A. striata

Binomial name
- Acropora striata (Verrill, 1866)

Synonyms
- Madrepora striata Verrill, 1866

Species of coral

Acropora striata is a species of acroporid coral found in the southwest Indian Ocean, the central Indo-Pacific, Japan and the East China Sea. It can also be found in the Marshall Islands, the Society Islands, the Cook Islands, Kiribati, the Solomon Islands, western and eastern Australia, the Great Barrier Reef, Palau, the south Mariana Islands and Pohnpei. It occurs in tropical shallow reefs on reef flats or rocky foreshores, at depths of 10 to 25 metres (33 to 82 ft). It probably spawns in October and was described by Addison Emery Verrill in 1866.

== Taxonomy ==
It was originally described as Madrepora striata by Addison Emery Verrill in 1866.

== Description ==
It occurs in colonies composed of short branches. It has small axial corallites and its radial corallites have no defined shape or size. It is grey-brown in colour and branches have white tips. It looks similar to Acropora parahemprichii and Acropora sekiseiensis.

== Distribution ==
It is classed as an endangered species on the IUCN Red List and it is believed that its population is decreasing; the species is also listed under Appendix II of CITES. Figures of its population are unknown, but is likely to be threatened by the global reduction of coral reefs, the increase of temperature causing coral bleaching, climate change, human activity, the crown-of-thorns starfish and disease. It occurs in the southwest Indian Ocean, the central Indo-Pacific, Japan and the East China Sea; it also occurs in the Marshall Islands, the Society Islands, the Cook Islands, Kiribati, the Solomon Islands, western and eastern Australia, the Great Barrier Reef, Palau, the south Mariana Islands and Pohnpei. It is found at depths of between 10 and 25 metres (33 and 82 ft) in tropical shallow reefs on reef flats or rocky foreshores.
