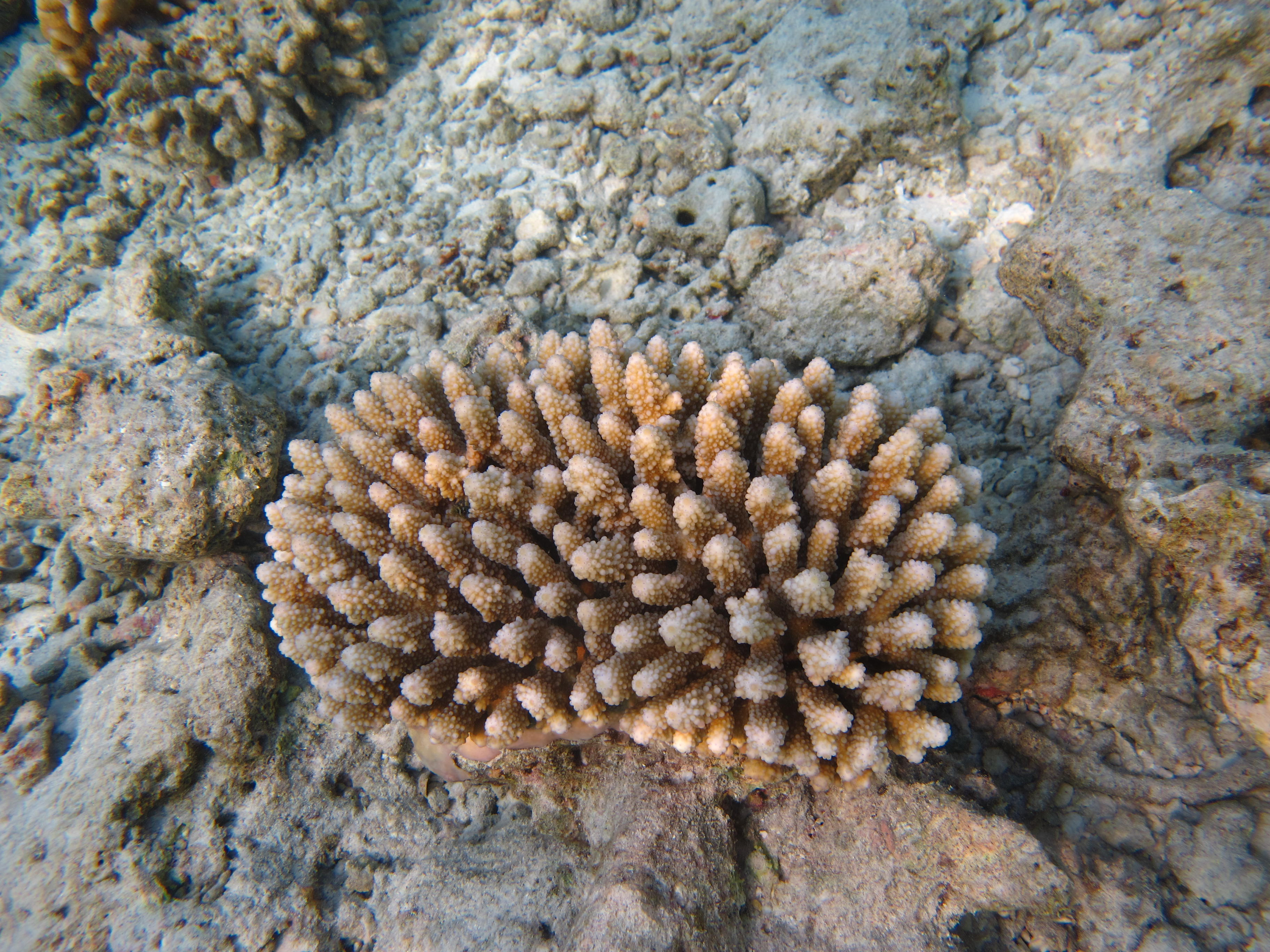

Conservation status
- Endangered (IUCN 3.1)

Scientific classification
- Kingdom: Animalia
- Phylum: Cnidaria
- Subphylum: Anthozoa
- Class: Hexacorallia
- Order: Scleractinia
- Family: Acroporidae
- Genus: Acropora
- Species: A. lutkeni

Binomial name
- Acropora lutkeni Crossland, 1952

= Acropora lutkeni =

Species of coral

Acropora lutkeni is a species of acroporid coral found in the central Indo-Pacific, Japan, Australia, the northern Indian Ocean, the East China Sea, southeast Asia, and the central and western Pacific Ocean. The species also occurs in the south Mariana Islands, American Samoa, Palau, the Andaman Islands, Fiji, the Philippines, the Banggai Islands, Samoa, the Raja Ampat Islands, the Line Islands, Papua New Guinea, and the Chagos Archipelago. It exists in tropical shallow reefs on upper slopes that are exposed to the action of strong waves or currents, and subtidally on edges of reefs and in submerged reefs. It exists at depths of between 3 and 12 m (10 and 39 ft) and probably spawns in October.

== Description ==
It is found in corymbose colonies in plate structures with tapered branches. Axial corallites are present and rounded, radial corallites are not orderly and have a variety of diameters and shapes. The species is grey, purple, or cream-brown in colour, and it looks similar to Acropora forskali.

== Distribution ==
It is classed as an endangered species on the IUCN Red List and it is believed that its population is decreasing; the species is also listed under Appendix II of CITES. Figures of its population are unknown, but is likely to be threatened by the global reduction of coral reefs, the increase of temperature causing coral bleaching, climate change, human activity, the crown-of-thorns starfish (Acanthaster planci) and disease. It occurs in the central Indo-Pacific, Japan, Australia, the northern Indian Ocean, the East China Sea, southeast Asia, and the central and western Pacific Ocean. The species also occurs in the south Mariana Islands, American Samoa, Palau, the Andaman Islands, Fiji, the Philippines, the Banggai Islands, Samoa, the Raja Ampat Islands, the Line Islands, Papua New Guinea, and the Chagos Archipelago. It exists at depths of between 3 and 12 metres (9.8 and 39.4 ft) and is found on upper slopes that are exposed to wave action and currents, on edges of reefs, and on submerged reefs.

== Taxonomy ==
Acropora lutkeni was described by Crossland in 1952.
