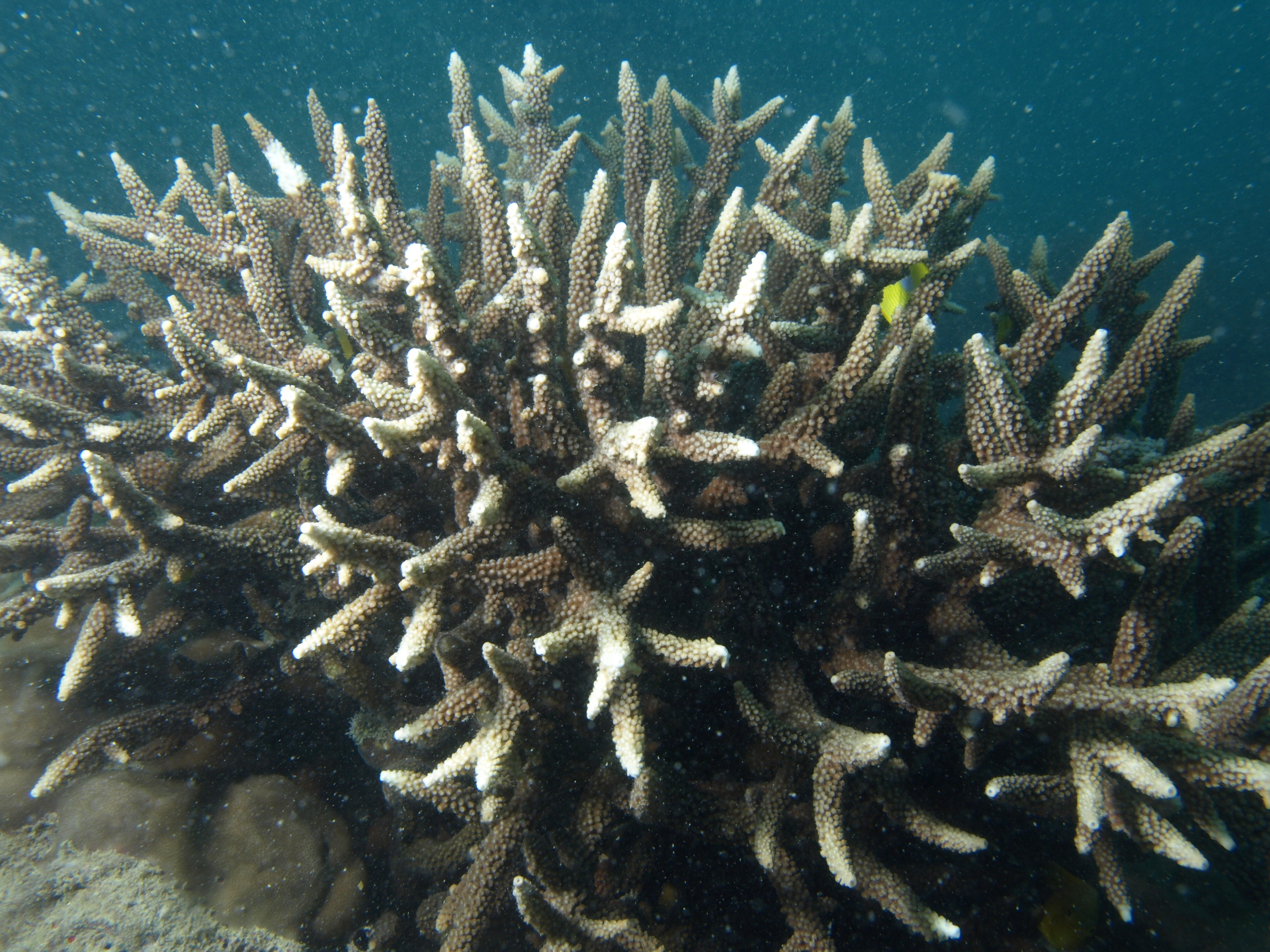

Conservation status
- Endangered (IUCN 3.1)

Scientific classification
- Kingdom: Animalia
- Phylum: Cnidaria
- Subphylum: Anthozoa
- Class: Hexacorallia
- Order: Scleractinia
- Family: Acroporidae
- Genus: Acropora
- Species: A. vaughani

Binomial name
- Acropora vaughani Wells, 1954

= Acropora vaughani =

Species of coral

Acropora vaughani is a species of acroporid coral found in the northern Indian Ocean, the central Indo-Pacific, Australia, southeast Asia, Japan, the East China Sea and the oceanic western and central Pacific Ocean. It is also found in Madagascar. It occurs in tropical shallow reefs around fringing reefs in turbid water, at depths of between 3 and 20 metres (9.8 and 65.6 ft). It was described by J. W. Wells in 1954.

== Taxonomy ==
Acropora vaughani was described by J. W. Wells in 1954.

== Description ==
It is found in open branched colonies that sometimes have appearances of bushes, which is provided by the presence of short branchlets. A large number of incipient axial corallites are present, and it has well-spaced radial corallites of varying lengths. It has a fine coenosteum. It is cream, pale blue, or brown in colour and looks similar to Acropora rufus.

== Distribution ==
It is classed as an endangered species on the IUCN Red List and it is believed that its population is decreasing; the species is also listed under Appendix II of CITES. Figures of its population are unknown, but is likely to be threatened by the global reduction of coral reefs, the increase of temperature causing coral bleaching, climate change, human activity, the crown-of-thorns starfish (Acanthaster planci) and disease. It occurs in the northern Indian Ocean, the central Indo-Pacific, Australia, southeast Asia, Japan, the East China Sea and the oceanic western and central Pacific Ocean. It is found at depths of between 3 and 20 metres (9.8 and 65.6 ft) in tropical shallow reefs around fringing reefs in turbid waters.
