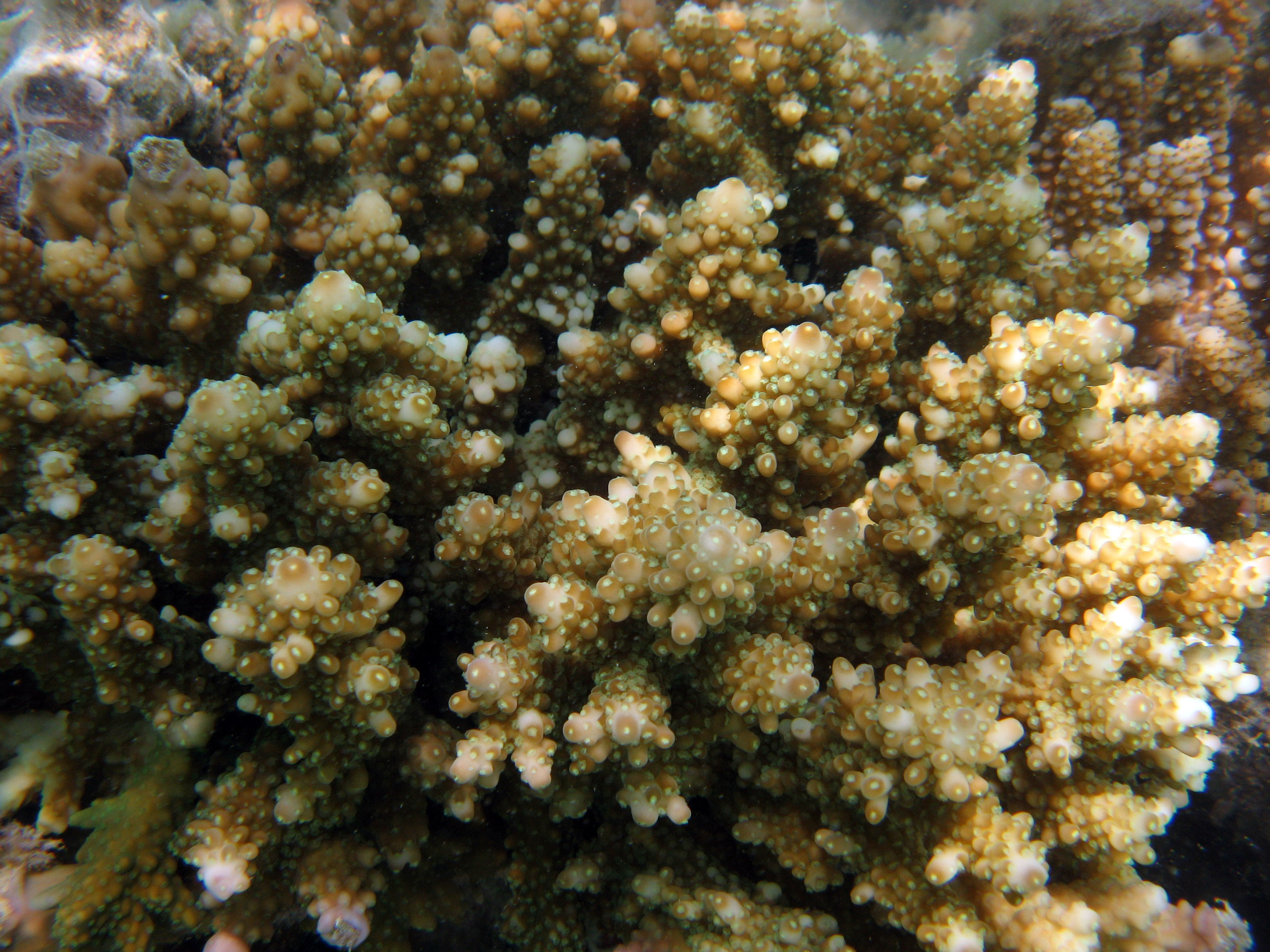

Conservation status
- Endangered (IUCN 3.1)

Scientific classification
- Kingdom: Animalia
- Phylum: Cnidaria
- Subphylum: Anthozoa
- Class: Hexacorallia
- Order: Scleractinia
- Family: Acroporidae
- Genus: Acropora
- Species: A. listeri

Binomial name
- Acropora listeri (Brook, 1893)

Synonyms
- Acropora diomedae Vaughan, 1906; Madrepora listeri Brook, 1893

= Acropora listeri =

Species of coral

Acropora listeri is a species of acroporid coral found in the Gulf of Aden, the Red Sea, the northern Indian Ocean, Australia, the central Indo-Pacific, Japan, southeast Asia, the East China Sea and the central and western Pacific Ocean. It is also present in Mauritius. The species is found in tropical shallow reefs on their upper slopes, especially in locations exposed to the action of strong waves, at depths of between 3 and 15 metres (9.8 and 49.2 ft). It was described by Brook in 1893.

== Description ==
It occurs in either corymbose or clumped colonies and its branches are thick and non-uniform in shape and length. Branches are often globular, dome-shaped, conical or tapered. At the ends of the branches, axial corallites may be present but most specimens have some branches without axial corallites. Radial corallites are tube-shaped and irregular with spiny appearances. The species is brown or cream in colour and there are no known similar species.

== Distribution ==
It is classified as a vulnerable species on the IUCN Red List and it is believed that its population is decreasing; the species is also listed under Appendix II of CITES. Figures of its population are unknown, but is likely to be threatened by the global reduction of coral reefs, the increase of temperature causing coral bleaching, climate change, human activity, the crown-of-thorns starfish (Acanthaster planci) and disease. It occurs in the Gulf of Aden, the Red Sea, the northern Indian Ocean, Australia, the central Indo-Pacific, Japan, southeast Asia, the East China Sea and the central and western Pacific Ocean. It is also present in Mauritius. The species is found at depths of between 3 and 15 metres (9.8 and 49.2 ft) in exposed regions on the upper slopes of tropical shallow reefs.

== Taxonomy ==
It was described as Madrepora listeri by Brook in 1893.
