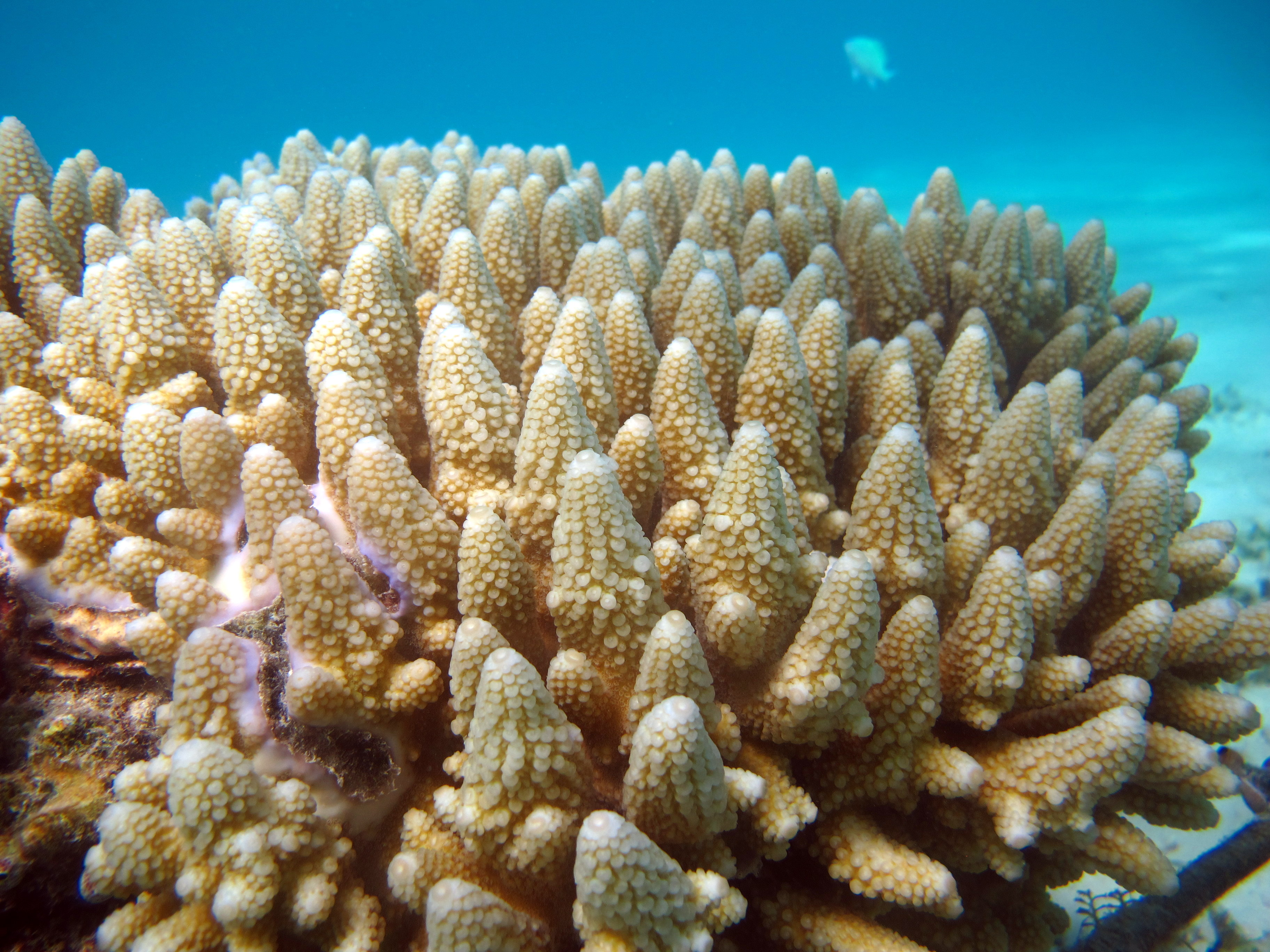

Conservation status
- Least Concern (IUCN 3.1)

Scientific classification
- Kingdom: Animalia
- Phylum: Cnidaria
- Subphylum: Anthozoa
- Class: Hexacorallia
- Order: Scleractinia
- Family: Acroporidae
- Genus: Acropora
- Species: A. gemmifera

Binomial name
- Acropora gemmifera (Brook, 1892)

Synonyms
- Acropora scherzeriana (Brüggemann, 1877); Madrepora australis Brook, 1892; Madrepora gemmifera Brook, 1892; Madrepora scherzeriana Brüggemann, 1877

= Acropora gemmifera =

Species of coral

Acropora gemmifera is a species of acroporid coral found in the Gulf of Aden, the Red Sea, the central Indo-Pacific, the southwest and northern Indian Ocean, southeastern Asia, Australia, the East China Sea, Japan, the oceanic central and western Pacific Ocean, and northwestern Hawaiʻi. It occurs on exposed upper reef flats and slopes, from depths of 1–15 m. It was described by Brook in 1892.

== Description ==
It occurs in digitate colonies consisting of thick tapering branches. Branches contain a single axial corallite on the end and the radial corallites are arranged in rows. Incipient axial corallites are located towards the bases of branches. It is blue, brown, cream or purple in colour and the branches have white or blue tips. The corallites are dark grey with white rims, and specimens in the Indian Ocean have been observed with yellowish axial corallites.

== Distribution ==
It is classed as a least concern species on the IUCN Red List, but it is thought that its population is decreasing in line with global coral decline, and it is listed under Appendix II of CITES. Figures of its population are unknown, but is likely to be threatened by the global reduction of coral reefs, the increase of temperature causing coral bleaching, climate change, human activity, the crown-of-thorns starfish (Acanthaster planci) and disease. It occurs in the Gulf of Aden, the Red Sea, the central Indo-Pacific, the southwest and northern Indian Ocean, southeastern Asia, Australia, the East China Sea, Japan, the oceanic central and western Pacific Ocean, and northwestern Hawaiʻi.

== Taxonomy ==
It was described by Brook in 1892 as Madrepora gemmifera.
