= Alveopora allingi =

Conservation status
- Endangered (IUCN 3.1)

Scientific classification
- Kingdom: Animalia
- Phylum: Cnidaria
- Subphylum: Anthozoa
- Class: Hexacorallia
- Order: Scleractinia
- Family: Acroporidae
- Genus: Alveopora
- Species: A. allingi

Binomial name
- Alveopora allingi Hoffmeister, 1925

Synonyms
- Alveopora mortenseni Crossland, 1952

Species of coral

Alveopora allingi is a species of stony coral that is found in the Red Sea, the Gulf of Aden, the southwest and northern Indian Ocean, the central Indo-Pacific, Australia, Southeast Asia, Japan, the East China Sea and the oceanic west and central Pacific Ocean. It has also been found in Palau and the Mariana Islands. It is susceptible to coral bleaching and is rated by the International Union for Conservation of Nature as an "endangered species".

== Description ==
Colonies of Alveopora allingi adopt a variety of forms. They can be columnar or encrusting, or have a number of short irregular lobes. The polyps are crowded together, fleshy and elongated, with a crown of tentacles with somewhat inflated tips.

== Biology ==
Alveopora allingi is a zooxanthellate species of coral. It obtains most of its nutritional needs from the symbiotic dinoflagellates that live inside its soft tissues. These photosynthetic organisms provide the coral with organic carbon and nitrogen, sometimes providing up to 90% of their host's energy needs for metabolism and growth. Its remaining needs are met by the planktonic organisms caught by the tentacles of the polyps.

== Status ==
This coral is susceptible to coral bleaching but not particularly prone to coral diseases. It is an attractive small coral and is collected by the reef aquarium trade. All corals receive protection by being listed on CITES Appendix II. The main threats faced by corals are related to climate change; the mechanical destruction of their coral reef habitats, increasing damage from extreme weather events, rising sea water temperatures and ocean acidification. The International Union for Conservation of Nature has assessed the conservation status of this species as being "endangered".
