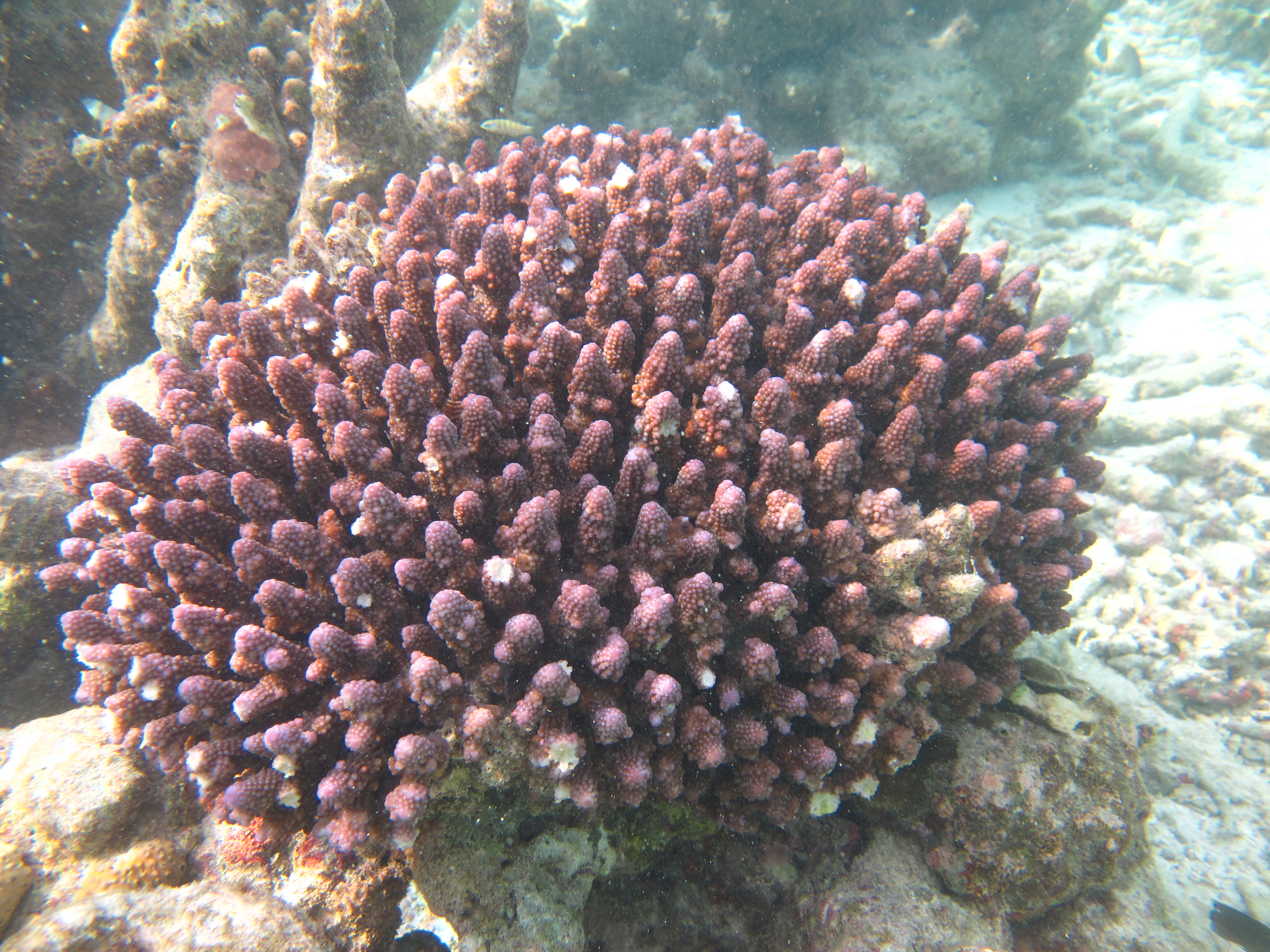

Conservation status
- Endangered (IUCN 3.1)

Scientific classification
- Kingdom: Animalia
- Phylum: Cnidaria
- Subphylum: Anthozoa
- Class: Hexacorallia
- Order: Scleractinia
- Family: Acroporidae
- Genus: Acropora
- Species: A. humilis

Binomial name
- Acropora humilis (Dana, 1846)

Synonyms
- List: Acropora ocellata (Klunzinger, 1879); Acropora spectabilis (Brook, 1892); Madrepora fruticosa Brook, 1892; Madrepora guppyi Brook, 1892; Madrepora humilis Dana, 1846; Madrepora obscura Brook, 1893; Madrepora ocellata Klunzinger, 1879; Madrepora spectabilis Brook, 1892

= Acropora humilis =

Species of coral

Acropora humilis, also known as finger coral, is a species of acroporid coral found in the Gulf of Aden, the Red Sea, the northern and southwestern Indian Ocean, Australia, the central Indo-Pacific, Japan, southeast Asia, the East China Sea, the central and western Pacific Ocean, the Johnston Atoll and the northwestern Hawaiian Islands. It also occurs in the Raja Ampat Islands, Mariana Islands, Palau, and the Pitcairn Islands. Occurring in tropical shallow reefs on upper reef flats and slopes at depths of up to 12 metres (39 ft), it was described by Dana in 1846.

== Description ==
The species is found in digitate colonies of thick tapering branches. The branches contain one or more axial corallites that are large and dome-shaped, and either incipient axial corallites or branchlets at their bases. Its radial corallites are found in two different diameters, the larger of which are organised in rows. It is mainly cream, blue, brown or purple in colour and the branches have cream or blue tips.

== Distribution ==
It is classed as a Near Threatened species on the IUCN Red List and it is believed that its population is decreasing; the species is also listed under Appendix II of CITES. Figures of its population are unknown, but is likely to be threatened by the global reduction of coral reefs, the increase of temperature causing coral bleaching, climate change, human activity, the crown-of-thorns starfish (Acanthaster planci) and disease. It occurs in the Gulf of Aden, the Red Sea, the northern and southwestern Indian Ocean, Australia, the central Indo-Pacific, Japan, southeast Asia, the East China Sea, the central and western Pacific Ocean, the Johnston Atoll and the northwestern Hawaiian Islands. It is present in the Raja Ampat Islands, Mariana Islands, Palau, and the Pitcairn Islands. The species occurs at depths of up to 12 metres (39 ft) on tropical upper reef flats and slopes and is exported to aquariums.

== Taxonomy ==
It was described as Madrepora humilis by Dana in 1846.
