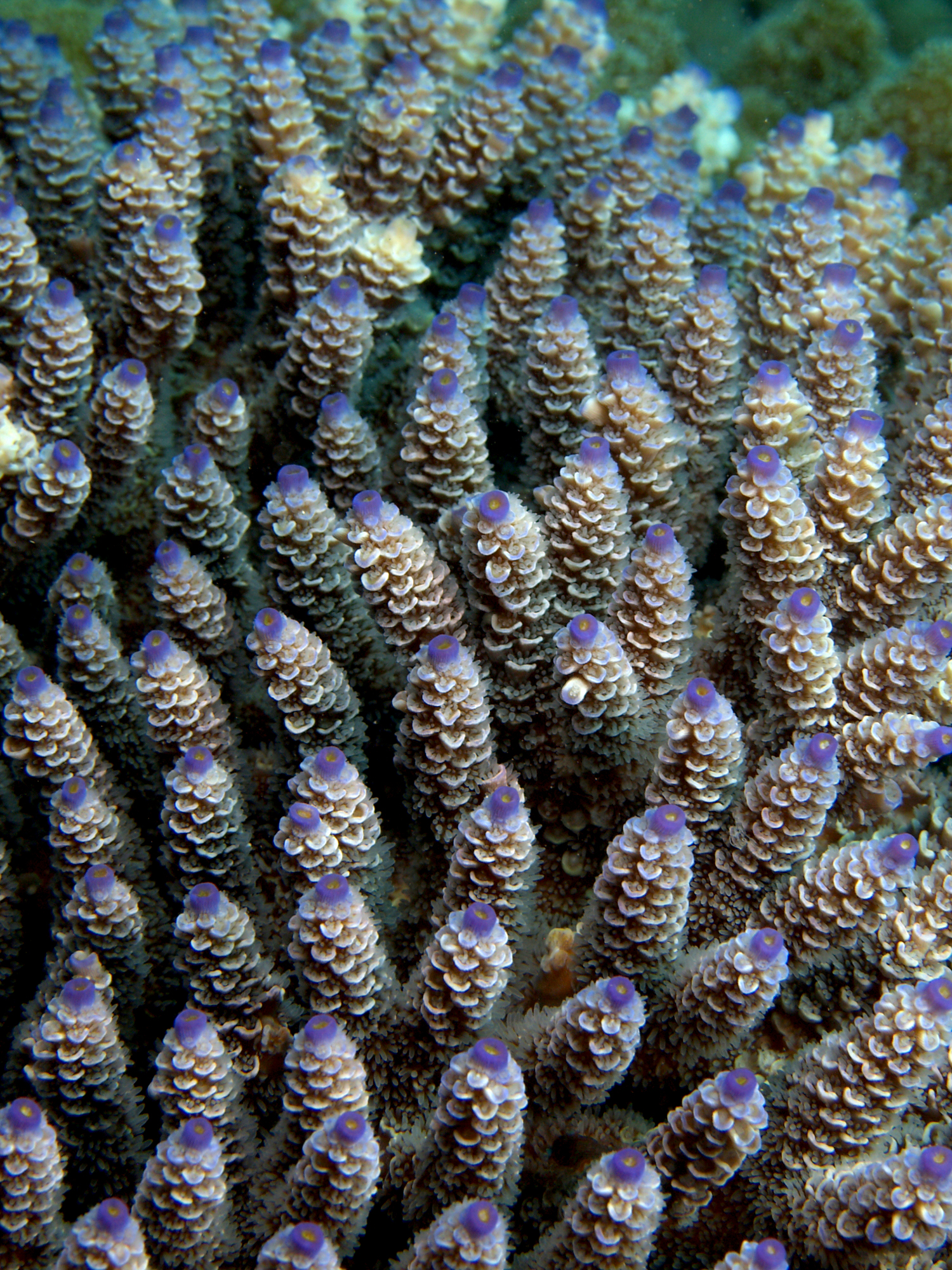

Conservation status
- Endangered (IUCN 3.1)

Scientific classification
- Kingdom: Animalia
- Phylum: Cnidaria
- Subphylum: Anthozoa
- Class: Hexacorallia
- Order: Scleractinia
- Family: Acroporidae
- Genus: Acropora
- Species: A. secale

Binomial name
- Acropora secale (Studer, 1878)

Synonyms
- List: Acropora concinna (Brook, 1891); Acropora diversa (Brook); Acropora otteri Crossland, 1952; Acropora quelchi (Brook, 1893); Madrepora concinna Brook, 1891; Madrepora diversa Brook, 1891; Madrepora quelchi Brook, 1893; Madrepora secale Studer, 1878; Madrepora violacea Brook, 1892

= Acropora secale =

Species of coral

Acropora secale is a species of branching staghorn stony coral. It is found in shallow parts of the Indo-Pacific Ocean and the type locality is Sri Lanka. The oldest fossils found date back to the Pleistocene.

== Description ==
Acropora secale is a colonial coral that forms low hummocks. The branches can grow to a diameter of 20 mm (0.8 in) and length of 70 millimetres (2.8 in). They are cylindrical but gradually taper towards the tips. They grow in a corymbose fashion with the lower branches being longer than the upper ones so that the coral has a level-topped appearance. The corallites are of varying sizes and arranged in vertical rows, often with alternate rows of larger and smaller corallites. The axial corallites are up to 3 millimetres (0.12 in) in diameter while the radial corallites either have long tubular openings or nariform (noselike) openings. The skeleton is covered by a thin ectodermal layer of tissue. When feeding, the polyps protrude from the corallites. Each has a single ring of twelve tentacles, one of which is longer than the others. The polyps have a mouth which opens into the coelenteron. This interconnects with other polyps through a complex system of channels, the coenenchyme, inside the porous skeleton. Several colour schemes occur in this coral, purple with yellow tips to the branches, pale brown with blue tips, plain green or plain brown.

== Distribution ==
Acropora secale is found in the tropical waters of the west Indo-Pacific including the coasts of East Africa, Mozambique, Rodrigues, Aldabra and Chagos. It is also found further east around Singapore, Thailand, Indonesia, Japan, the Philippines, Taiwan and north and west Australia. It is a reef-building coral and occurs at depths down to 5 metres (16 ft) on outer reef flats, reef slopes, reef edges and walls.

== Biology ==
Acropora secale is a zooxanthellate species of coral. This means that it has symbiotic dinoflagellates living within its tissues. These, combined with pigments in the tissue, are responsible for the colour of the colony.

Acropora secale is a hermaphrodite and both female gonads and testes are present and mature once a year. The colonies release eggs and sperm simultaneously, usually six days after the full moon, in November in the Southern Hemisphere and in June in the Northern Hemisphere. Fertilisation is external; the developing larvae form part of the plankton and drift with the current before settling on the seabed.
