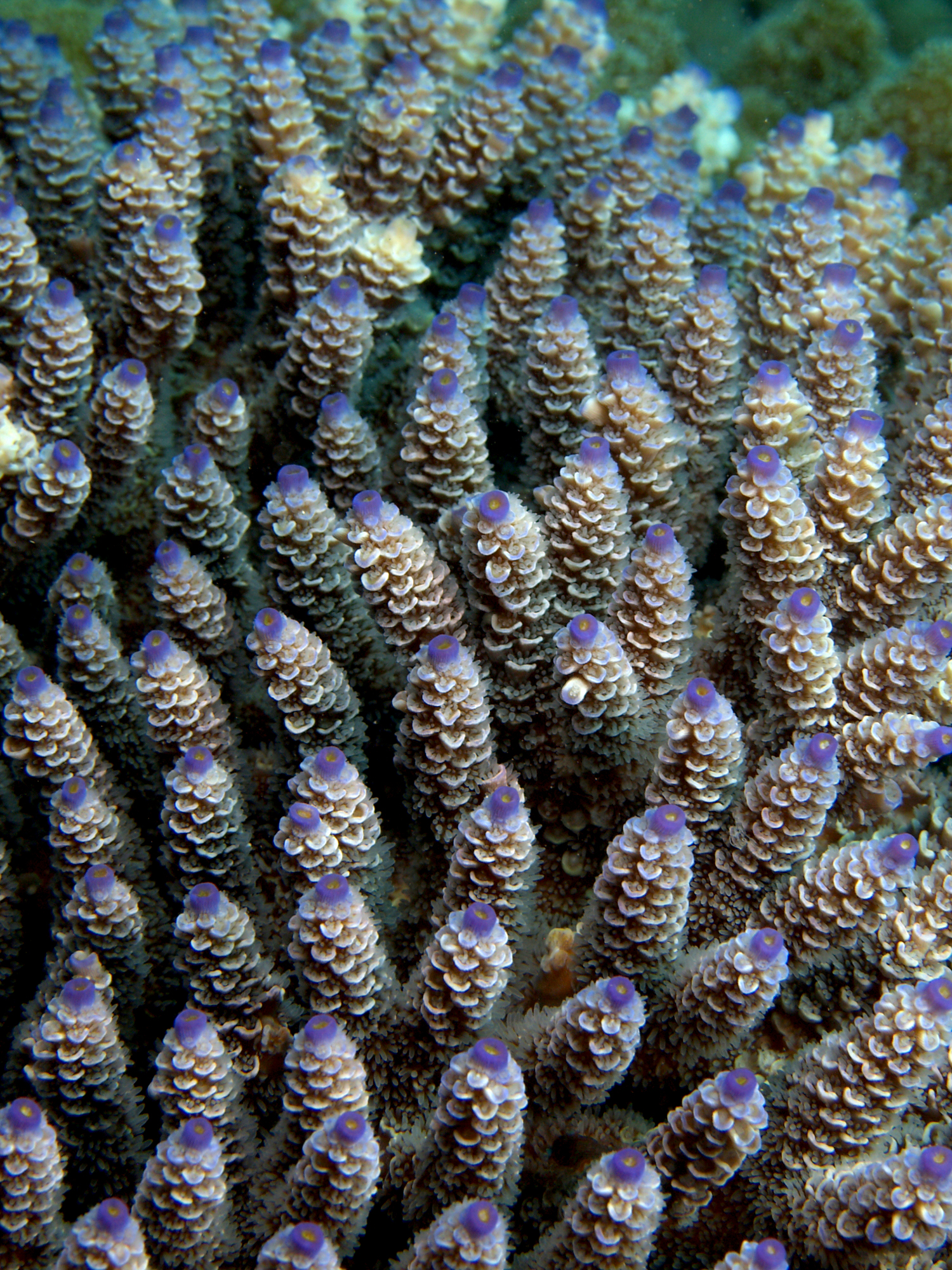
- Acropora secale, the corallites can be seen at the end of the branches.

Scientific classification
- Kingdom: Animalia
- Phylum: Cnidaria
- Subphylum: Anthozoa
- Class: Hexacorallia
- Order: Scleractinia
- Suborder: Astrocoeiina
- Family: Acroporidae; Verrill, 1902

Genera
- Acropora; Alveopora; Anacropora; Astreopora; Enigmopora; Isopora; Montipora

= Acroporidae =

Acroporidae Temporal range: Jurassic - recent

Family of stony corals

Acroporidae is a family of small polyped stony corals in the phylum Cnidaria. The name is derived from the Greek "akron" meaning "summit" and refers to the presence of a corallite at the tip of each branch of coral. They are commonly known as staghorn corals and are grown in aquaria by reef hobbyists.

== Description ==
Staghorn corals are the dominant group of reef builders. They come in many shapes and sizes and can be highly variable in colour and form, even within the same species. Most are either a branching variant or a wall/ table top variant shaped and some are encrusting (growing over rock structures). Their colours vary between browns, whites, pinks, blues, yellows, greens and purple, depending not only on species but also on the growing conditions. Identification is difficult and requires close examination of the corallites and a biochemical and genetic analysis. There is a corallite at the tip of each branch and, with the exception of Astreopora, these are small with up to twelve septa in two cycles.

== Distribution ==
Anacropora, Astreopora and Montipora are found in the Indian and Pacific Ocean. Acropora is cosmopolitan and is both common and conspicuous, usually being dominant in Indo-Pacific reefs. Enigmopora is represented by a single new species, Enigmopora darveliensis, found in Malaysia and the Philippines.

== Biology ==
Staghorn corals are hermaphrodites. They are mostly broadcast-spawners and some species have been involved in annual synchronous mass-spawning events on the Great Barrier Reef and in Japanese and Indonesian waters. Some species undergo fragmentation, a form of asexual reproduction, and this sometimes results in reefs composed of a single species.
