= Acropora jacquelineae =

Conservation status
- Vulnerable (IUCN 3.1)

Scientific classification
- Kingdom: Animalia
- Phylum: Cnidaria
- Subphylum: Anthozoa
- Class: Hexacorallia
- Order: Scleractinia
- Family: Acroporidae
- Genus: Acropora
- Species: A. jacquelineae

Binomial name
- Acropora jacquelineae Wallace, 1994

Synonyms
- Acropora jacquelinae orth. var.

Species of coral

Acropora jacquelineae is a species of acroporid coral found in the eastern Indian Ocean and the central and western Pacific Ocean. It can be found offshore of Indonesia, Malaysia, Papua New Guinea, the Samoan Islands, and the Solomon Islands. It occurs in tropical shallow reefs on reef slopes and flats in subtidal areas, at depths of around between 15 and 35 metres (49 and 115 ft). It was described by Carden Wallace in 1994.

== Description ==
The species is found in colonies with diameters of up to 1 metre (39 in) in plate structures. Its axial corallites are delicate and curved, which makes colonies of the species have an appearance similar to moss. Radial corallites are not present on this uncommon species, which is either pinkish or grey-brown in colour. It has similar features to Acropora paniculata.

== Distribution ==
It is classed as a vulnerable species on the IUCN Red List and it is believed that its population is decreasing; the species is also listed under Appendix II of CITES. Figures of its population are unknown, but is likely to be threatened by the global reduction of coral reefs, the increase of temperature causing coral bleaching, climate change, human activity, the crown-of-thorns starfish (Acanthaster planci) and disease. It occurs in the eastern Indian Ocean and the central and western Pacific Ocean. It can be found offshore of Indonesia, Malaysia, Papua New Guinea, the Samoan Islands, and the Solomon Islands, and occurs at depths of around between 15 and 35 metres (49 and 115 ft) on subtidal areas of tropical shallow reefs on slopes and flats.

== Taxonomy ==
It was described by Carden Wallace in 1994 as Acropora jacquelineae.
