= Acropora caroliniana =

Conservation status
- Vulnerable (IUCN 3.1)

Scientific classification
- Kingdom: Animalia
- Phylum: Cnidaria
- Subphylum: Anthozoa
- Class: Hexacorallia
- Order: Scleractinia
- Family: Acroporidae
- Genus: Acropora
- Species: A. caroliniana

Binomial name
- Acropora caroliniana Nemenzo, 1976

Species of coral

Acropora caroliniana is a species of acroporid coral that was first described by Nemenzo in 1976. Found in tropical, shallow reef slopes, it occurs at depths of 5 to 25 m (16 to 82 ft) in a marine environment. The species is rated as vulnerable on the IUCN Red List, with a decreasing population. It is rare, but has been found over a large area, and two-thirds of the regions of Indonesia.

== Description ==
Acropora caroliniana species form in thick horizontal structures, made of flat branches. It is light green, pale blue or white-brown in colour, and are also found on small branchlets. These have large axial corallites with diameters up to 1.7 to 3.5 millimetres (0.067 to 0.138 in) which become narrow at the ends, and curve upwards. The species' radial corallites are small and "pocket-like". It looks similar to Acropora lokani and Acropora loripes. It is found on the upper slopes of tropical, shallow reefs, at depths of between 5 and 25 m (16 and 82 ft), and reaches maturity at over eight years. The species is found at temperatures of 25.48 to 27.5 °C (77.86 to 81.50 °F). Colonies have diameters of up to 50 centimetres (20 in) and branchlets can reach lengths of 25 millimetres (0.98 in) and widths of 8 millimetres (0.31 in).

== Distribution ==
Acropora caroliniana is uncommon but found over a large area; Australia, western Pacific, the Indo-Pacific, Pohnpei, and Fiji in marine habitats. It occurs in two-thirds of the regions of Indonesia and also in Papua New Guinea. It is threatened by the global reduction of coral reefs, the increase of temperature causing bleaching, disease, coral harvesting, climate change, fishing, human development, pollution, and being prey to starfish Acanthaster planci. It is sometimes found in Marine Protected Areas. It is listed as a vulnerable species on the IUCN Red List as the population is decreasing, and is listed under Appendix II of CITES.

== Taxonomy ==
It was first described by F. Nemenzo in 1976 in the Philippines as Acropora caroliniana.
