= Acropora kimbeensis =

Conservation status
- Endangered (IUCN 3.1)

Scientific classification
- Kingdom: Animalia
- Phylum: Cnidaria
- Subphylum: Anthozoa
- Class: Hexacorallia
- Order: Scleractinia
- Family: Acroporidae
- Genus: Acropora
- Species: A. kimbeensis

Binomial name
- Acropora kimbeensis Wallace, 1999

Species of coral

Acropora kimbeensis is a species of acroporid coral that was first described by Dr. Carden Wallace in 1999. Found in marine, tropical, shallow reefs usually at depths of 3 to 12 m (9.8 to 39.4 ft), but can occur as low as 15 m (49 ft). It is listed as a vulnerable species on the IUCN Red List, and it is thought to have a decreasing population. It is not common and found over a large area, and is listed on CITES Appendix II.

== Description ==
Acropora kimbeensis is found in compact colonies in bush-like structures. It is yellow, blue, or cream in colour, and the branches are upward-facing, become thinner towards the ends, and are caespitosed. The branchlets contain small, obvious axial corallites, and the incipient axial corallites are spaced equally. Radial corallites are present up the sides of the branchlets, and each contains a small opening (below 1 mm (0.039 in) in size). It looks similar to Acropora cerealis and Acropora subulata. Branches are up to 80 millimetres (3.1 in) long. It is found in marine, tropical, shallow reefs on the upper slopes, usually at depths of between 3 and 12 m (9.8 and 39.4 ft). It can also occur in lagoons, patch reefs, reef fronts, and reef flats, and can exist at depths as low as 15 m (49 ft). It reaches maturity at between three and eight years, and lives for more than ten years.

== Distribution ==
Acropora kimbeensis is found over a large area but is uncommon; the Indo-Pacific, the East China Sea, west Pacific, Eastern Australia, Southeast Asia, Papua New Guinea, Osprey Reef Coral Sea, Micronesia, and Pohnpei. It occurs in one region of Indonesia, and at two sites of the Marshall Islands. There is a lack of population data for the species, but it is known to be declining. In 2005, 1,282 live specimens were exported for use in aquariums. It is affected by bleaching by rising sea temperatures, coral disease, climate change, pollution, human development, fishing, infrastructure, and being exported. It is listed as a vulnerable species on the IUCN Red List and is listed under CITES Appendix II, and can occur within Marine Protected Areas.

== Taxonomy ==
It was first described by C. C. Wallace in 1999 as Acropora kimbeensis in the Indo-Pacific.
