= Acropora lokani =

Conservation status
- Endangered (IUCN 3.1)

Scientific classification
- Kingdom: Animalia
- Phylum: Cnidaria
- Subphylum: Anthozoa
- Class: Hexacorallia
- Order: Scleractinia
- Family: Acroporidae
- Genus: Acropora
- Species: A. lokani

Binomial name
- Acropora lokani Wallace, 1994

Species of coral

Acropora lokani is a species of acroporid coral that was first described by C. C. Wallace in 1994. Found in marine, shallow reefs and sheltered lagoons, it occurs at depths between 8 and 25 m (26 and 82 ft). It is listed as vulnerable on the IUCN Red List, and is believed to have a decreasing population. It is not common but found over a large area, including in three regions of Indonesia, and is listed under CITES Appendix II.

== Description ==
Acropora lokani is found in colonies up to 30 centimetres (12 in) wide and consisting of upright strong branches. It is brown, cream or blue in colour, and its branches have diameters of 5 to 7 millimetres (0.20 to 0.28 in) and may grow to 20 millimetres (0.79 in) long. The branches divide into branchlets, which contain axial, incipient axial, and radial corallites. The axial corallites are located on the end of the branchlets and are large and tube-shaped, with inner diameters of between 0.6 and 0.9 millimetres (0.024 and 0.035 in) and outer diameters of 2.2 to 2.6 millimetres (0.087 to 0.102 in). The radial corallites are small and are both surrounded by and contain elaborate spinules. The species looks similar to Acropora caroliniana and Acropora granulosa. It is found in sheltered lagoons, flats of shallow reefs, patch reefs, and in other shallow marine environments. It occurs at depths of between 8 and 25 m (26 and 82 ft). It is composed of aragonite (calcium carbonate).

== Distribution ==
Acropora lokani is not common but found over a large area; the Indo-Pacific, Fiji, Southeast Asia, American Samoa, Raja Ampat, the Solomon Islands, Pohnpei, and also the Great Barrier Reef. It is native to American Samoa, Australia, three regions of Indonesia, Fiji, Micronesia, Malaysia, New Caledonia, Papua New Guine, Samoa, Singapore, Thailand, the Philippines, and the Solomon Islands. There is a lack of population data for the coral, but numbers are believed to be declining. It is threatened by climate change, rising sea temperatures causing bleaching, reef destruction, coral disease, being prey to starfish Acanthaster planci, and human activity. It is listed as a vulnerable species on the IUCN Red List, is listed under CITES Appendix II, and may occur within Marine Protected Areas.

== Taxonomy ==
It was first described by C. C. Wallace in 1994 in the Indo-Pacific Ocean as Acropora lokani.
