= Acropora batunai =

Conservation status
- Vulnerable (IUCN 3.1)

Scientific classification
- Kingdom: Animalia
- Phylum: Cnidaria
- Subphylum: Anthozoa
- Class: Hexacorallia
- Order: Scleractinia
- Family: Acroporidae
- Genus: Acropora
- Species: A. batunai

Binomial name
- Acropora batunai Wallace, 1997

Species of coral

Acropora batunai is a species of acroporid coral that was described by Carden Wallace in 1997. Found in protected, shallow reefs, it occurs in a marine environment at depths of up to 44 m (144 ft). The species is rated as vulnerable on the IUCN Red List, with a decreasing population, and is extremely fragile. It can be found over a large area but, overall, is not common.

== Description ==
Acropora batunai species form in structures resembling cushions or corymboses that are 35 millimetres (1.4 in) thick and 1.25 metres (4 ft 1 in) wide. In colour, it is grey, blue, pale brown, and sometimes pink or brown-white. It has long flat branches which contain upright-facing branches and can be arranged in a table-like structure. The radial corallites and axial corallites are combined, small, sharp and tube-like, with the radial corallites are arranged like bottlebrushes. Axial corallites have diameters of 0.6–1 millimetre (0.024–0.039 in) (outer) and 0.2–0.5 millimetres (0.0079–0.0197 in) (inner). The species is similar to Acropora microclados and Acropora rambleri. It is found in sheltered shallow reefs at depths of up to 44 m (144 ft), but is most common on reef slopes at 10 to 40 m (33 to 131 ft). It is possible that it can be found at 1 m (3.3 ft) deep. It uses its polyps to catch plankton.

== Distribution ==
Acropora batunai is not common and can be found in the Indo-Pacific, in Fiji, Ponape, the Solomon Islands, Papua New Guinea, the Philippines, Malaysia, and Indonesia. It lives in marine habitats in reefs of the central and west Pacific Ocean. It is found in one region of Indonesia, and is incredibly fragile, and is threatened by the global reduction of coral reefs, the increase of temperature causing bleaching, disease, and being prey to the Acanthaster planci. Some specimens occur in Marine Protected Areas. It is listed as a vulnerable species on the IUCN Red List as the population is decreasing, and is listed under Appendix II of CITES.

== Taxonomy ==
The species was first described by Carden Wallace in 1997 as Acropora batunai in Indonesia.
