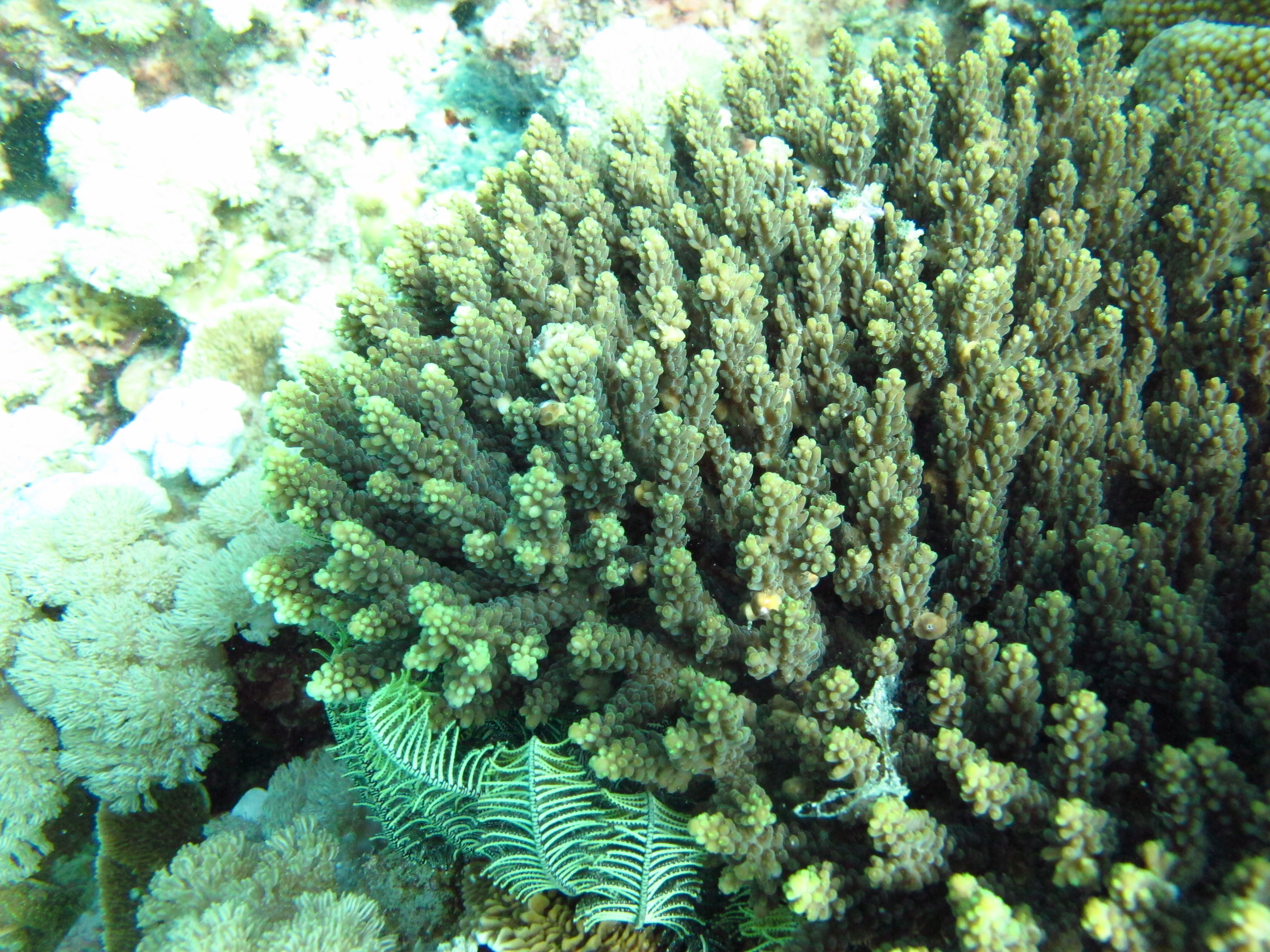

Conservation status
- Least Concern (IUCN 3.1)

Scientific classification
- Kingdom: Animalia
- Phylum: Cnidaria
- Subphylum: Anthozoa
- Class: Hexacorallia
- Order: Scleractinia
- Family: Acroporidae
- Genus: Acropora
- Species: A. cerealis

Binomial name
- Acropora cerealis (Dana, 1846)

Synonyms
- List: Acropora cymbicyathus (Brook, 1893); Acropora tizardi (Brook, 1892); Madrepora cerealis Dana, 1846; Madrepora cymbicyathus Brook, 1893; Madrepora hystrix Dana, 1846; Madrepora tizardi Brook, 1892

= Acropora cerealis =

Species of coral

Acropora cerealis is a species of acroporid coral found throughout the Indian and Pacific oceans, from the Red Sea and the Gulf of Aden to the Hawaiian Islands and the Johnston Atoll. It can be found on upper reef slopes in shallow tropical reefs, from depths of 3–20 m. Crown-of-thorns starfish preferentially prey upon Acropora corals, and this species is also harvested for the aquarium trade.

== Description ==
It occurs in either corymbose or cespitose colonies consisting of interlocking branches, each locked to three other branches. Its thin branches contain a large number of corallites considerably contributing to their widths. Radial corallites of the species are tube-shaped and built into the branches, with nariform obvious tips. Its axial corallites are also tubular. Branches have blue, cream, pink or purple branch tips, and the species is either cream, pale brown or white in colour. It has a similar appearance to Acropora kimbeensis and Acropora plantaginea.

== Distribution ==
It is classed as a least concern species on the IUCN Red List, but it is believed that its population is decreasing due to the global decline in coral reefs, and it is listed under Appendix II of CITES. Figures of its population are not known, but is likely to be threatened by the global reduction of coral reefs, the increase of temperature causing coral bleaching, climate change, human activity, the crown-of-thorns starfish (Acanthaster planci) and disease. It occurs in the eastern and western Indian Ocean, Australia, and the eastern central, northwest, central-western and southwest Pacific Ocean; from the Gulf of Aden and Red Sea to the Hawaiian Islands and Johnson Atoll.

== Taxonomy ==
It was described by James Dwight Dana in 1846.
