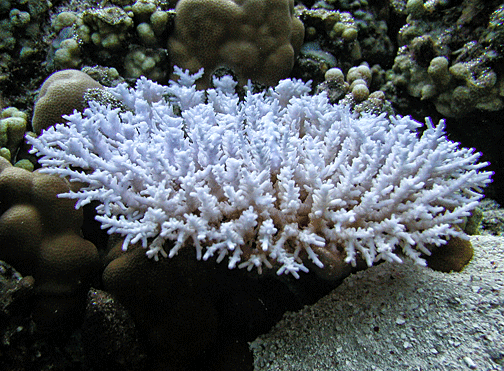

Conservation status
- Endangered (IUCN 3.1)

Scientific classification
- Kingdom: Animalia
- Phylum: Cnidaria
- Subphylum: Anthozoa
- Class: Hexacorallia
- Order: Scleractinia
- Family: Acroporidae
- Genus: Acropora
- Species: A. paniculata

Binomial name
- Acropora paniculata Verrill, 1902

= Acropora paniculata =

Species of coral

Acropora paniculata is a species of acroporid coral that was first described by Addison Emery Verrill in 1902. Found in marine, tropical, shallow reefs on the upper slopes, it occurs at depths of between 10 and 35 m (33 and 115 ft). It is classed as a vulnerable species on the IUCN Red List, and it has a decreasing population. It is uncommon but found over a large area, including in five regions of Indonesia, and is classified under CITES Appendix II.

== Description ==
Acropora paniculata occurs in colonies with plate-like structures, which are over 1 m (3.3 ft) wide and 25 mm (0.98 in) deep. The branches contain branchlets, which are short. Blue, grey, or cream in colour, the branchlets contain axial, incipient axial, and radial corallites. The incipient axial and axial corallites are tube-shaped, long, and thin, and occur on the tips of the branchlets. It looks similar to Acropora jacquelineae. It occurs in a marine environment in tropical, shallow reefs on the upper slopes—on the edges of reefs, and also in lagoons sheltered from strong waves, at depths of between 10 and 35 m (33 and 115 ft). The mineralised tissue is composed of aragonite (calcium carbonate).

== Distribution ==
Acropora paniculata is found over a large area but is uncommon; the Indo-Pacific, the East China Sea, the western Pacific, the Hawaiian Islands, the central Pacific, the Rodrigues, the Society Islands, the Johnston Atoll, Southeast Asia, Japan, and Eastern Australia. Despite being generally uncommon, it is common in some specific areas such as Papua New Guinea. It occurs in five regions of Indonesia, and at seven locations on the Marshall Islands. It occurs at temperatures between 25.48 and 28.07 °C (77.86 and 82.53 °F). The population of the species is known to be decreasing. It is threatened by climate change, coral disease, rising sea temperatures leading to bleaching, reef destruction, being prey to Acanthaster planci, and activity of humans. It is listed as a vulnerable species on the IUCN Red List, is listed CITES Appendix II, and could occur within Marine Protected Areas.

== Taxonomy ==
It was first described by Addison Emery Verrill in 1902 as Acropora paniculata.
