= COTSBot =

Small autonomous underwater vehicle (AUV)

COTSBot is a small autonomous underwater vehicle (AUV) 4.5 feet (1.4 m) long, which is designed by Queensland University of Technology (QUT) to kill the very destructive crown-of-thorns starfish (Acanthaster planci) in the Great Barrier Reef off the north-east coast of Australia. It identifies its target using an image-analyzing neural net to analyze what an onboard camera sees, and then lethally injects the starfish with a bile salt solution using a needle on the end of a long underslung foldable arm.

COTSBot uses GPS to navigate. The first version was created in the early 2000s with an accuracy rate of about 65%. After training COTSBot with machine learning, its accuracy rate rose to 99% by 2019.

COTSBot is capable of killing 200 crown-of-thorns starfish with its two liters capacity of poison. COTSBot is capable of performing about 20 runs per day, but multiple COTSBots will be necessary to significantly impact the crown of thorns starfish populations.

A smaller version of COTSBot called "RangerBot" is also being developed by QUT.
