= Acropora speciosa =

Conservation status
- Vulnerable (IUCN 3.1)

- Threatened (ESA)

Scientific classification
- Kingdom: Animalia
- Phylum: Cnidaria
- Subphylum: Anthozoa
- Class: Hexacorallia
- Order: Scleractinia
- Family: Acroporidae
- Genus: Acropora
- Species: A. speciosa

Binomial name
- Acropora speciosa (Quelch, 1886)

Synonyms
- List: Acropora rambleri (Bassett-Smith, 1890); Madrepora fragilis Bassett-Smith, 1890; Madrepora rambleri Bassett-Smith, 1890; Madrepora rayneri Brook, 1892; Madrepora speciosa Quelch, 1886

Species of coral

Acropora speciosa is a species of acroporid coral found in the Red Sea, the Gulf of Aden, the southwest and northern Indian Ocean, the central Indo-Pacific, Southeast Asia, Japan, the East China Sea, eastern Australia and the oceanic west and central Pacific Ocean. It occurs in shallow reefs at depths of 2 to 25 metres (6 ft 7 in to 82 ft 0 in).

== Description ==
This species occurs in table-shaped colonies with diameters sometime beyond 1 metre (3 ft 3 in). Its horizontal branches are irregularly arranged. Axial corallites are tube-shaped and long, and radial corallites are triangular and have nariform openings; they are immersed on the species' main branches. It is pale brown in colour and has a similar appearance to Acropora batunai, Acropora echinata, and Acropora granulosa.

== Distribution ==
This species is classed as a data deficient species on the IUCN Red List, but it is believed that its population is decreasing in line with the global decline in coral reefs, and it is listed under Appendix II of CITES. Figures of its population are unknown, but is likely to be threatened by the global reduction of coral reefs, the increase of temperature causing coral bleaching, climate change, human activity, the crown-of-thorns starfish (Acanthaster planci) and disease. It occurs in the Red Sea, the Gulf of Aden, the southwest and northern Indian Ocean, the central Indo-Pacific, Southeast Asia, Japan, the East China Sea, eastern Australia and the oceanic west and central Pacific Ocean. It is found at depths of between 2 and 25 metres (6 ft 7 in and 82 ft 0 in) in shallow reefs.

== Taxonomy ==
It was originally described by JJ Quelch in 1886.
