= Carden Wallace =

Australian scientist (born 1970)

Carden Wallace AM
- Education: University of Queensland
- Occupation: Scientist
- Known for: Research on corals
- Children: 2

Carden Crea Wallace AM (fl. 1970–) is an Australian scientist who was the curator/director of the Museum of Tropical Queensland from 1987 to 2003. She is an expert on corals having written a "revision of the Genus Acropora". Wallace was part of a team that discovered mass spawning of coral in 1984.

== Life ==
Carden C. Wallace graduated with a first class degree in Science from the University of Queensland in 1970. She gave birth to two sons in the 1970s. From 1970 to 1976, she was the curator of lower vertebrates at the Queensland Museum. She obtained her Ph.D. in 1979 at the University of Queensland. Wallace spent a brief period researching at the Australian Institute of Marine Science before researching Marine Biology from 1980 as a fellow at the James Cook University of North Queensland.

In 1984, Wallace and six others first reported that corals took part in mass spawning which they observed on the Great Barrier Reef in October/November. Since they first observed reproductive synchrony in coral in Australia, it has been observed in other countries but at different times of the year. As a result, the team from James Cook University were awarded the Eureka Prize for Environmental Research in 1992. This example of creatures synchronising their reproduction was novel, and it was reported widely.

== Museum of Tropical Queensland ==
In 1987, the North Queensland Branch of the Queensland Museum was under the direction of 'Curator-in-Charge' Carden Wallace. Whilst still at the museum, she was credited with first describing a number of corals including Acropora hoeksemai and Acropora batunai in 1997.

Wallace was named Director of the Museum of Tropical Queensland in 1997. Its new building was opened in June 2000 by the Queensland Premier Peter Beattie. In 1999, Wallace published an important work on corals titled "Staghorn Corals of the World: A Revision of the Genus Acropora". This was the first study in over a century of the genus Acropora, and it included a full description of each sub-species.

Sally Lewis took over as director of the Queensland Tropical Museum in 2003. In 2008, Wallace and others reported on the recovery of bio-diversity following the atomic explosion at Bikini Atoll. The team reported that there had been some recovery, but 28 types of coral were extinct. In 2014, she described several new species including Acropora macrocalyx. Wallace is a member of the board of OceanNEnvironment. When the Ocean Geographic Society ran a photographic competition in 2014, the award for seascapes was called the Carden Wallace Award.
