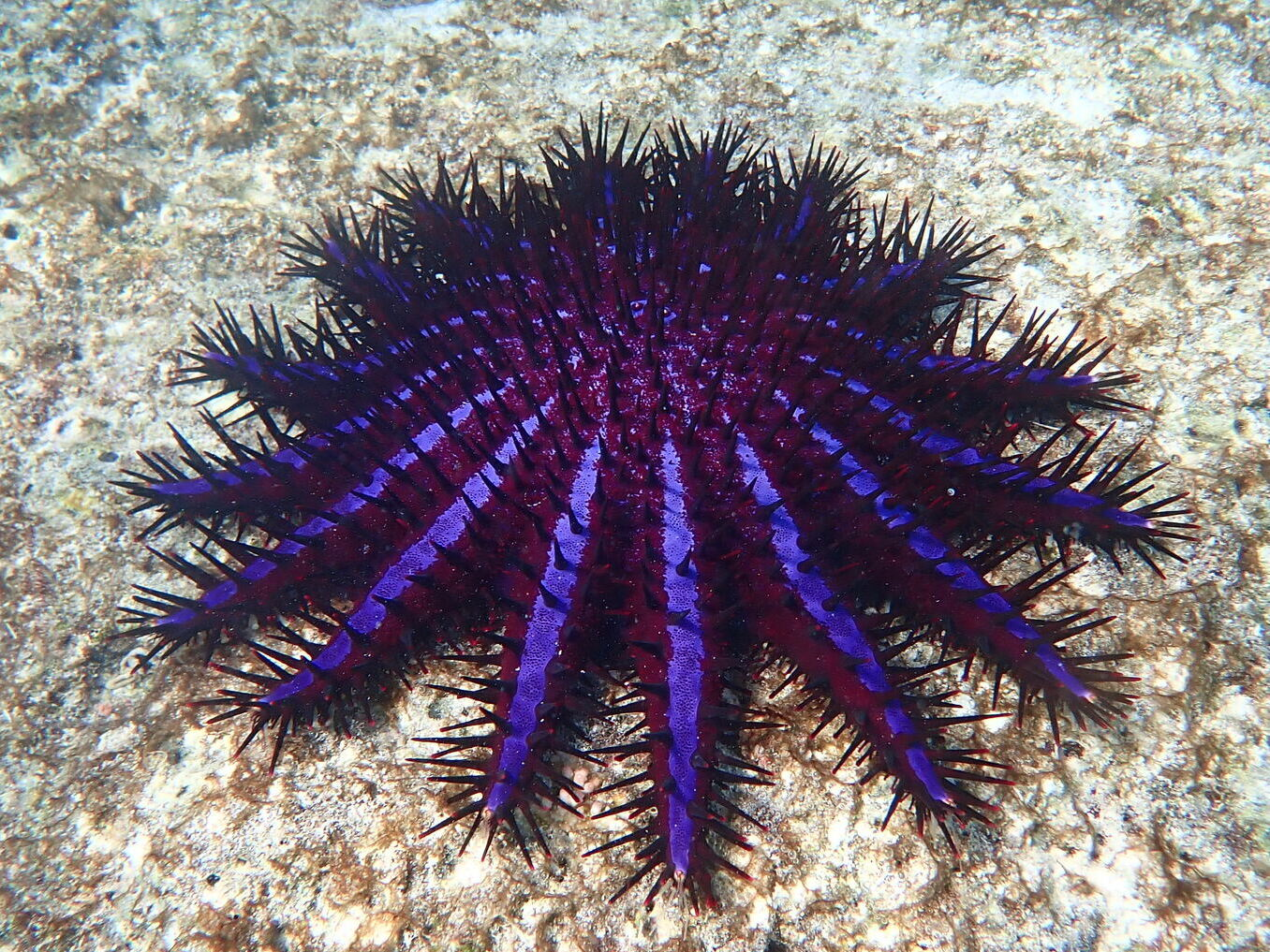

Scientific classification
- Kingdom: Animalia
- Phylum: Echinodermata
- Class: Asteroidea
- Order: Valvatida
- Family: Acanthasteridae
- Genus: Acanthaster
- Species: A. planci

Binomial name
- Acanthaster planci (Linnaeus, 1758)

= Crown-of-thorns starfish =

Species of starfish

The crown-of-thorns starfish (Acanthaster planci) is a large starfish that preys upon hard coral polyps. The crown-of-thorns starfish, frequently abbreviated to COTS, receives its name from venomous, thornlike spines that cover its upper surface, resembling the biblical crown of thorns. It is one of the largest starfish in the world.

A. planci has a very wide Indo-Pacific distribution, perhaps most common around Australia, but can occur at tropical and subtropical latitudes from the Red Sea and the East African coast across the Indian Ocean, and across the Pacific Ocean to the west coast of Central America. It occurs where coral reefs or hard coral communities occur in the region. Echinobase is the model organism database for A. planci and a number of other echinoderms.

== Description ==
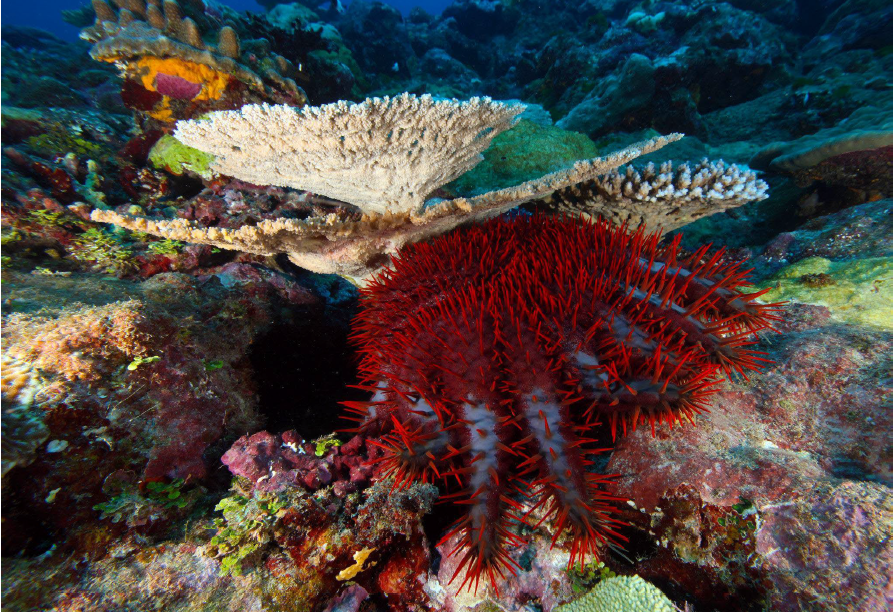
A red crown-of-thorns starfish on a coral reef in the National Marine Sanctuary of American Samoa

The body form of the crown-of-thorns starfish is fundamentally the same as that of a typical starfish, with a central disc and radiating arms. Its special traits, however, include being disc-shaped, multiple-armed, flexible, prehensile, and heavily spined, and having a large ratio of stomach surface to body mass. Its prehensile ability arises from the two rows of numerous tube feet that extend to the tip of each arm. In being multiple-armed, it has lost the five-fold symmetry (pentamerism) typical of starfish, although it begins its lifecycle with this symmetry. The animal has true image-forming vision.

Adult crown-of-thorns starfish normally range in size from 25 to 35 cm (10 to 14 in). They have up to 21 arms. Although the body of the crown of thorns has a stiff appearance, it is able to bend and twist to fit around the contours of the corals on which it feeds. The underside of each arm has a series of closely fitting plates, which form a groove and extend in rows to the mouth. Depending on diet or geographic region, individuals can be purple, purple-blue, reddish grey or brown with red spine tips, or green with yellow spine tips.

The long, sharp spines on the sides of the starfish's arms and upper (aboral) surface resemble thorns and create a crown-like shape, giving the creature its name. The spines can range from 4 to 5 cm long and are stiff, very sharp, and readily pierce through soft surfaces. Despite the battery of sharp spines on the aboral surface and blunt spines on the oral surface, the crown-of-thorns starfish's general body surface is membranous and soft. When the starfish is removed from the water, the body surface ruptures and the body fluid leaks out, so the body collapses and flattens. The spines bend over and flatten, as well. They recover their shape when reimmersed, if they are still alive.

== Taxonomy ==
=== Family ===
The family Acanthasteridae is monogeneric. According to comparative morphology studies by paleontologist Daniel Blake, A. planci has strong similarities with various members of the family Oreasteridae. He transferred the Acanthasteridae from the order Spinulosida to the order Valvatida and assigned it a position near to the Oreasteridae, from which it appears to be derived. He attributed Acanthaster morphology as possibly evolving in association with its locomotion over irregular coral surfaces in high-energy environments. A complication exists, however, in that Acanthaster is not a monospecific genus and any consideration of the genus must also take into account three other recognized species of Acanthaster brevispinus, Acanthaster benziei and Acanthaster mauritiensis which live in a different habitats. A. brevispinus lives on soft substrates, perhaps buried in the substrate at times like other soft substrate-inhabiting starfish, at moderate depths, where presumably the surface is regular and little wave action occurs.

=== Genus and species ===
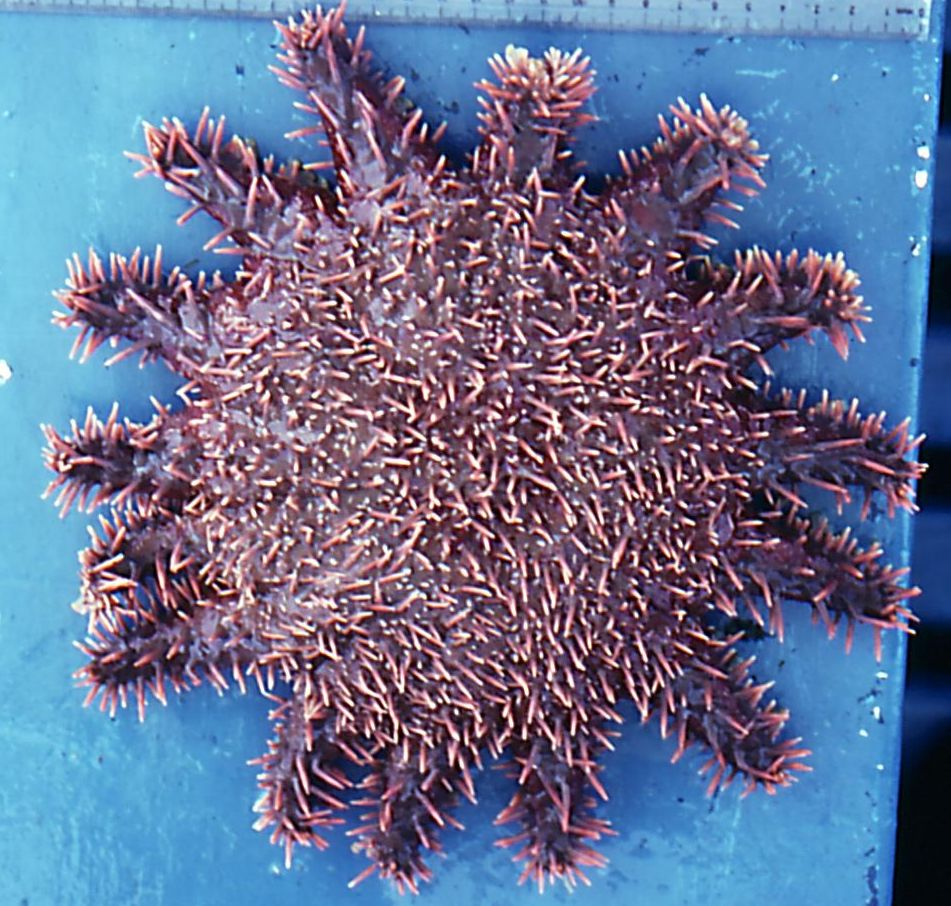
Acanthaster ellisi, a short-spined subspecies of A. planci

A. planci has a long history in the scientific literature with great confusion in the generic and specific names from the outset, with a long list of complex synonyms. Georg Eberhard Rumphius first described it in 1705, naming it Stella marina quindecium radiotorum with a specimen from Ambon Island, Indonesia. It was later described as Stella marina echinata (Latin for spiny marine star) by Plancus and Gualtieri in 1743. It was formally described by Linnaeus in appendix of the 12th edition of his Systema naturae in 1767, who named the species in honour of Janus Plancus (the pseudonym of Giovanni Bianchi). No type specimens are known; the specimen described by Plancus and Gualtieri (1743) no longer exists.

Genus names used for the crown-of-thorns starfish included Echinaster (Gray, 1840) and Echinites (Müller & Troschel, 1844), before settling on Acanthaster (Gervais 1841). Specific names for A. planci included echinites, echinus, solaris, mauritensis, ellisi, and pseudoplanci. Most of these names arose from confusion in the historical literature, but Acanthaster ellisi came to be used for the distinctive starfish in the eastern Pacific (Gulf of California), and is now considered a subspecies of A. planci. Acanthaster ellisi is distinct with its rather "plump" body, large disc-to-total diameter ratio, and short blunt spines. Acanthaster mauritensis has since been identified as a distinct species, while the rest remain as synonyms of A. planci.

A. planci as a taxon is a generalist, being amongst the most ubiquitous of large coral predators on coral reefs, feeding on virtually all hard coral species, reproducing during summer without a pattern of spawning, and often participating in mass multiple-species spawnings, and releasing vast amounts of gametes that trigger spawning in other individuals.

=== Phylogeny ===
In 1985, researchers examined genetic variation of 10 population samples of A. planci using starch-gel electrophoresis. The samples were from localities across the Pacific: Ryukyu Archipelago (four locations), Micronesia (two locations), and samples from one location each of the Great Barrier Reef, Fiji, Hawaii, and the Gulf of California. A sample of 10 specimens of A. brevispinus from the Great Barrier Reef region was included for comparison. Considerable genetic differentiation was seen between the A. brevispinus and A. planci populations (D= 0.20 +/− 0.02)(D is genetic distance). The genetic differences between geographic populations of A. planci were, however, small (D = 0.03 +/− 0.00). A positive correlation was observed between degree of genetic differentiation and geographic distance, suggesting the genetic homogeneity among A. planci populations is due to gene flow by planktonic larval dispersion. The distance effect on genetic differentiation most probably reflects decreasing levels of successful larval dispersal over long distances. In view of the level of macrogeographic homogeneity, significant allele frequency differences were observed between adjacent populations separated by about 10 km. The Hawaiian population was most differentiated from other populations. Treating the morphologically distinctive, eastern Pacific Acanthaster as a separate species, A. ellisii, is not supported by these data. The lack of unique alleles in the central (Hawaii) and eastern Pacific (Gulf of California) populations suggests they were derived from those in the western Pacific.

Further details of the genetic relationship between A. planci and A. brevispinus were presented in the entry for the latter species. These are clearly sibling species, and A. planci, the specialized, coral-feeding species, is suggested to have arisen from A. brevispinus, the less-specialized, soft-bottom inhabitant.

A comprehensive geographic study conducted in 1999, examined allozyme loci variation in 20 populations of A. planci, throughout the Pacific and Indian Ocean. The most striking result was a very marked discontinuity between the Indian and Pacific Ocean populations. Those, however, off northern Western Australia had a strong Pacific affinity. With the exception of the very strong connection of southern Japanese populations to the Great Barrier Reef populations, the patterns of variation within regions were consistent with isolation by distance. The author suggests that the divergence between Indian Ocean and Pacific Ocean populations began at least 1.6 million years ago and is likely to reflect responses to changes in climate and sea level.

A thorough molecular and phylogeographic study conducted in 2008 by Vogler et al. of A. planci using DNA analyses (one mitochondrial gene) suggests it is actually a species complex consisting of four species or clades. The four cryptic species/clades are defined geographically: Northern Indian Ocean, southern Indian Ocean, Pacific Ocean and Red Sea. These molecular data suggest the species/clades diverged 1.95 and 3.65 million years ago (the divergence of A. planci and A. brevispinus is not included in this time scale). The authors suggested that the differences between the four putative species in behavior, diet, or habitat may be important for the design of appropriate reef-conservation strategies. Three localities that were sampled in this study; Palau, UAE and Oman were found to have two clades/sibling species in sympatry. However, the four species were not correlated with any Linnean taxon names by the researchers and this caused further delay in establishment of the species of this genus. The separation of three of these species (from Northern Indian Ocean, Pacific Ocean and Red Sea) was also confirmed using a nuclear genome-based analysis by a study conducted in 2021 by Yuasa et al. Species from southern Indian Ocean could not be included in the study due to sampling difficulties.

In 2014, a nomenclatorial study set available names for two of the four species, these being A. planci (for the northern Indian Ocean species) and Acanthaster mauritiensis (de Loriol, 1885) (for the southern Indian Ocean species) and proposed the name of the third species as Acanthaster solaris (Schreber, 1795) (for the Pacific Ocean species). The fourth species (from Red Sea) was formally described as Acanthaster benziei by Wörheide et al. in 2022. Wörheide et al. (2022) constructed the following Cytochrome c oxidase subunit I maximum likelihood (COI ML) tree of the Indo-Pacific A. planci species complex based on the haplotype alignment of Vogler et al. (2008) combined with full mitochondrial genome sequences from Yuasa et al. (2021) and four sequences of the type series of A. benziei. The tree was rooted with A. brevispinus and highlighted the deep divergence among, and little diversity within the species/geographic clades.

- - - Acanthaster cf. solaris
      (Pacific Ocean)
    - - Acanthaster planci
        (Northern Indian Ocean)
      - Acanthaster mauritiensis
        (Southern Indian Ocean)
  - Acanthaster benziei
    (Red Sea)
- Acanthaster brevispinus

== Biology ==
=== Toxins ===
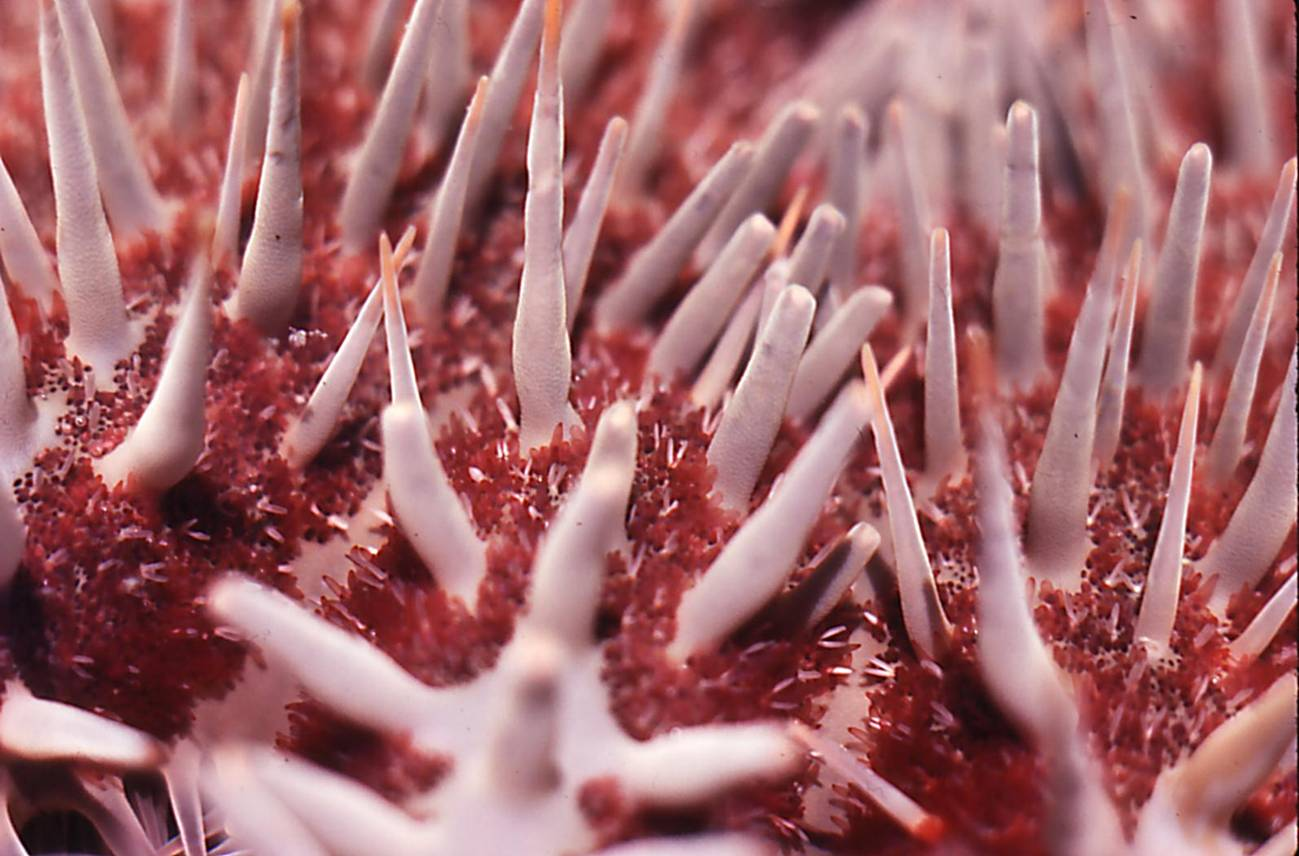
Broken and regenerating spines

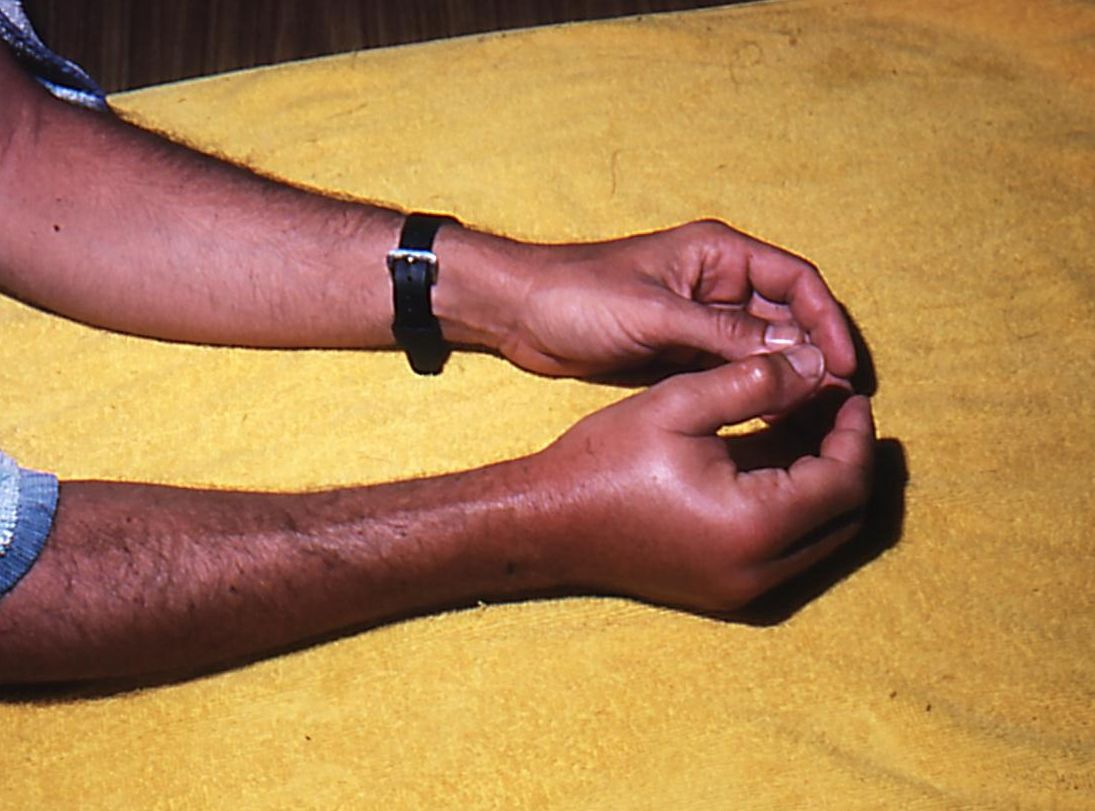
Swollen right hand after having been punctured

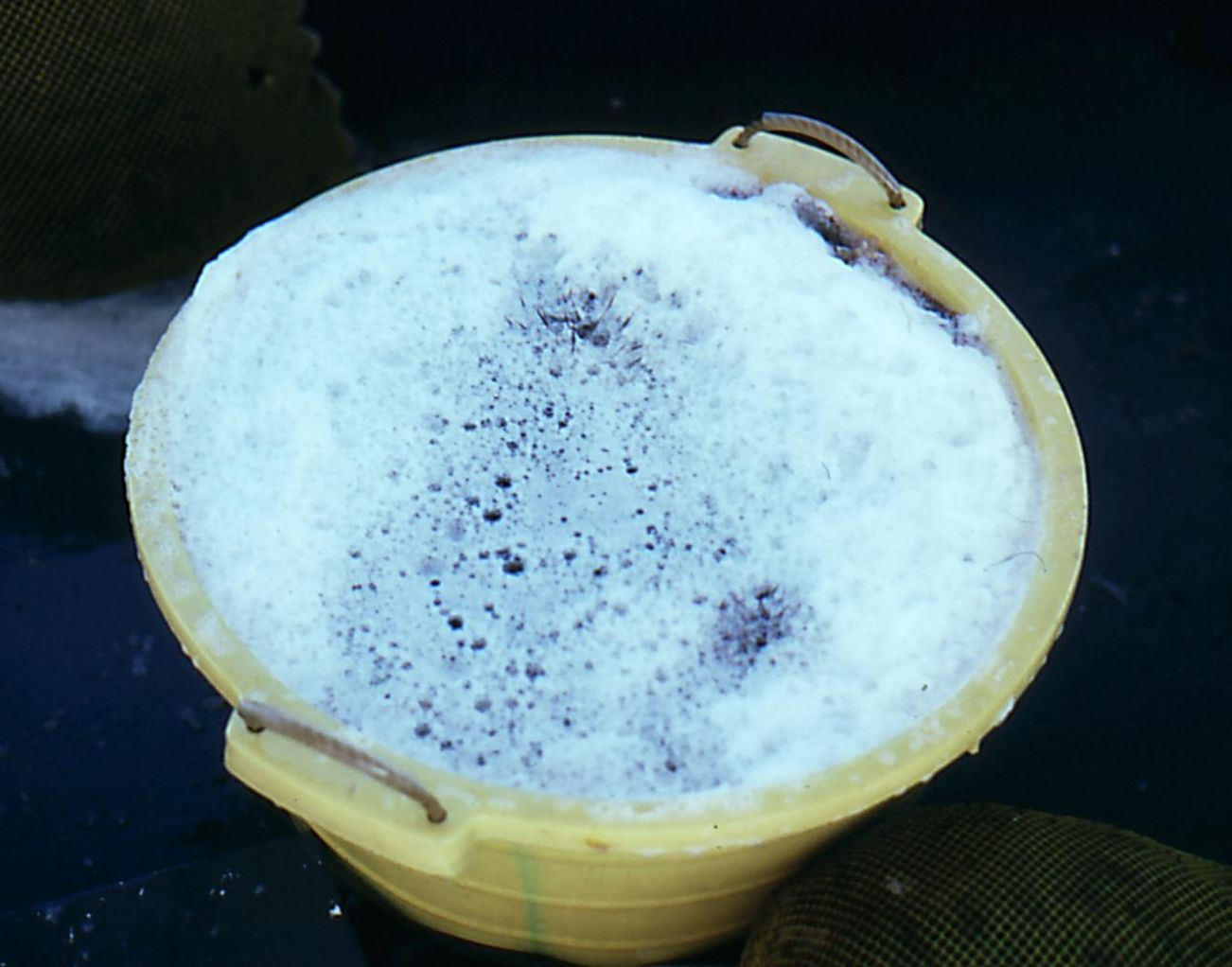
Frothing in water containing A. planci

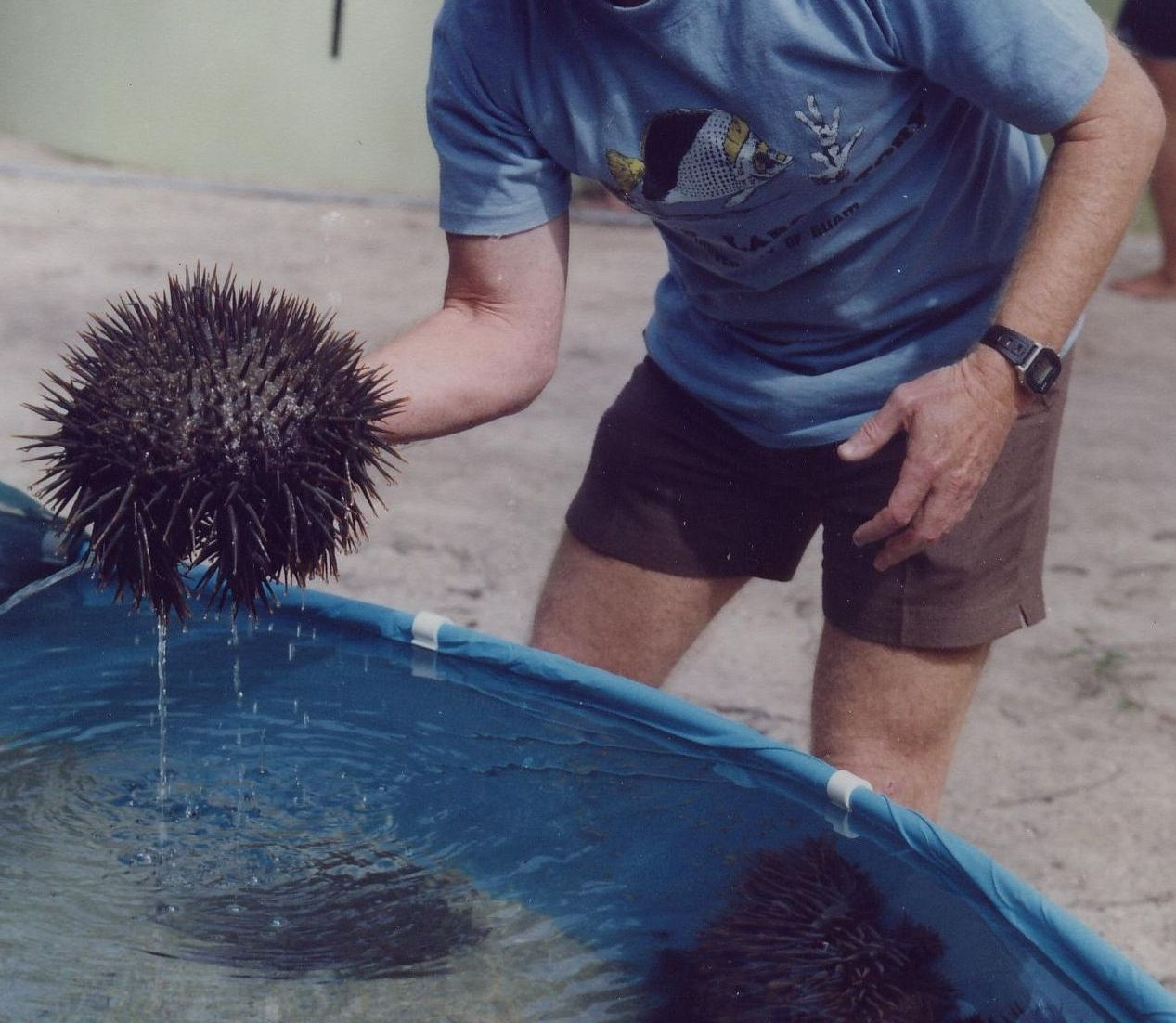
Starfish handled to avoid damaging it (spines on the underside are blunt)

Starfish are characterized by having saponins known as asterosaponins in their tissues. They contain a mix of these saponins, and at least 15 chemical studies have been conducted seeking to characterize them. They have detergent-like properties, and keeping starfish in limited water volumes with aeration results in large amounts of foam at the surface.

A. planci has no mechanism for injecting the toxin, but as the spines perforate tissue of a predator or unwary person, tissue containing the saponins is lost into the wound. In humans, this immediately causes a sharp, stinging pain that can last for several hours, persistent bleeding due to the haemolytic effect of saponins, and nausea and tissue swelling that may persist for a week or more. The spines, which are brittle, may also break off and become embedded in the tissue, from which they must be surgically removed.

Saponins seem to occur throughout the lifecycle of the crown-of-thorns starfish. The saponins in the eggs are similar to those in the adult tissues, and presumably these carry over to the larvae. The mouthing behaviour of predators of juvenile starfish with rejection suggests the juveniles contain saponins.

=== Diet ===
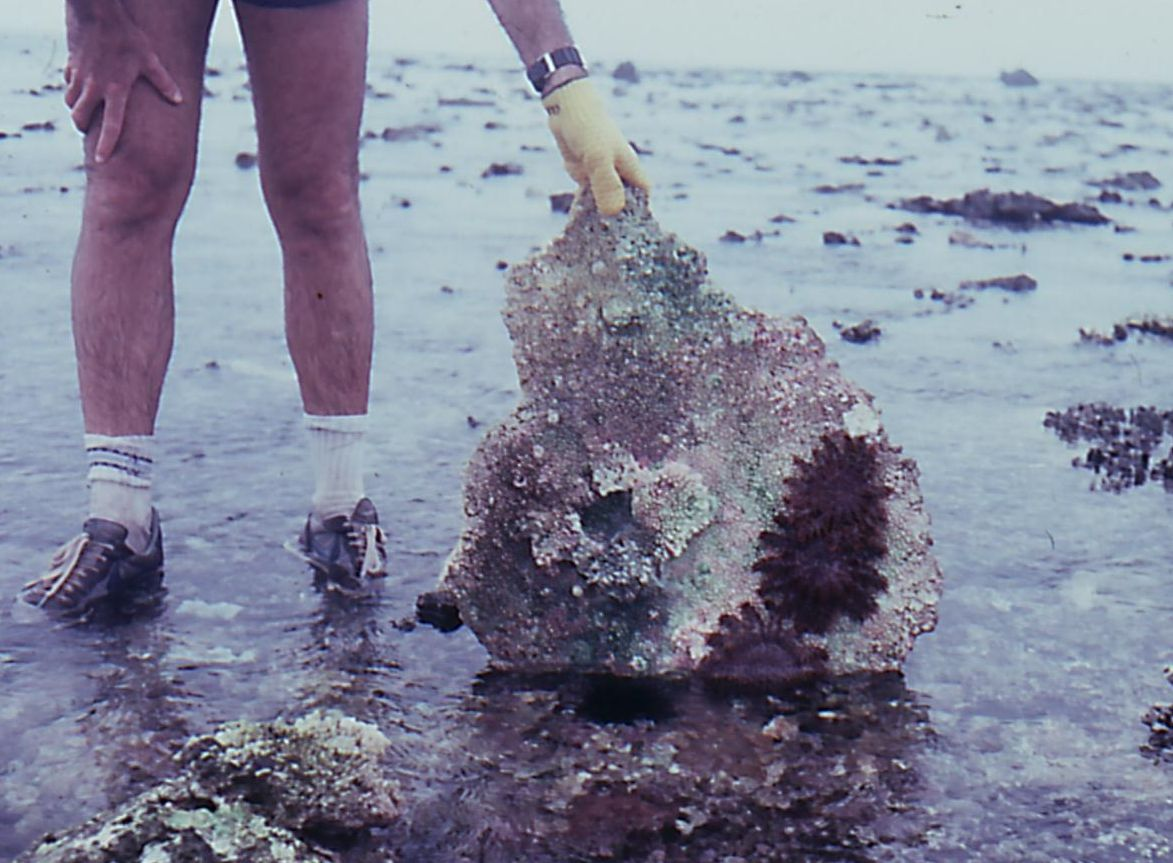
Juveniles concealed under coral rubble

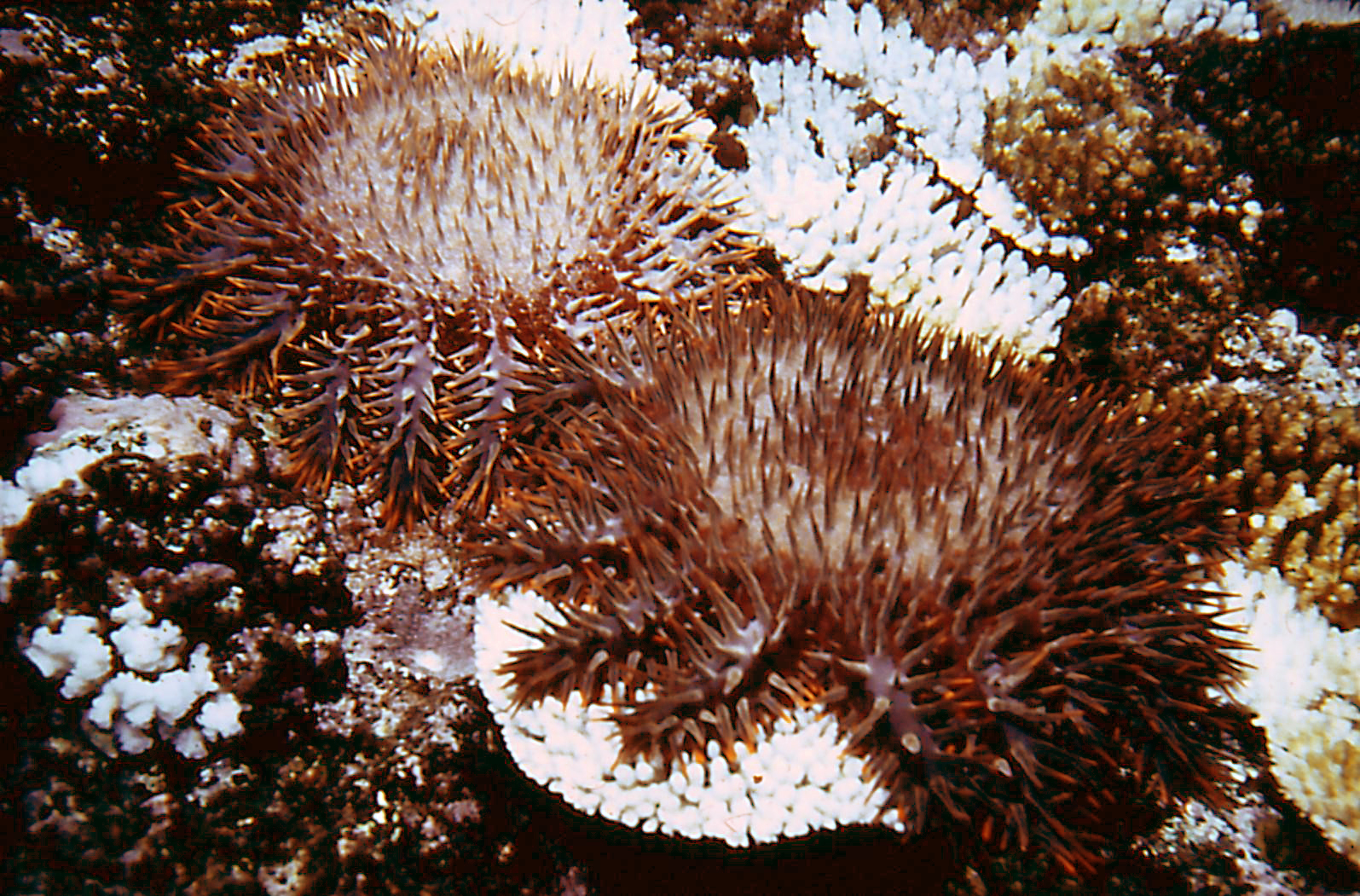
Two starfish feeding on a coral, leaving white feeding scars

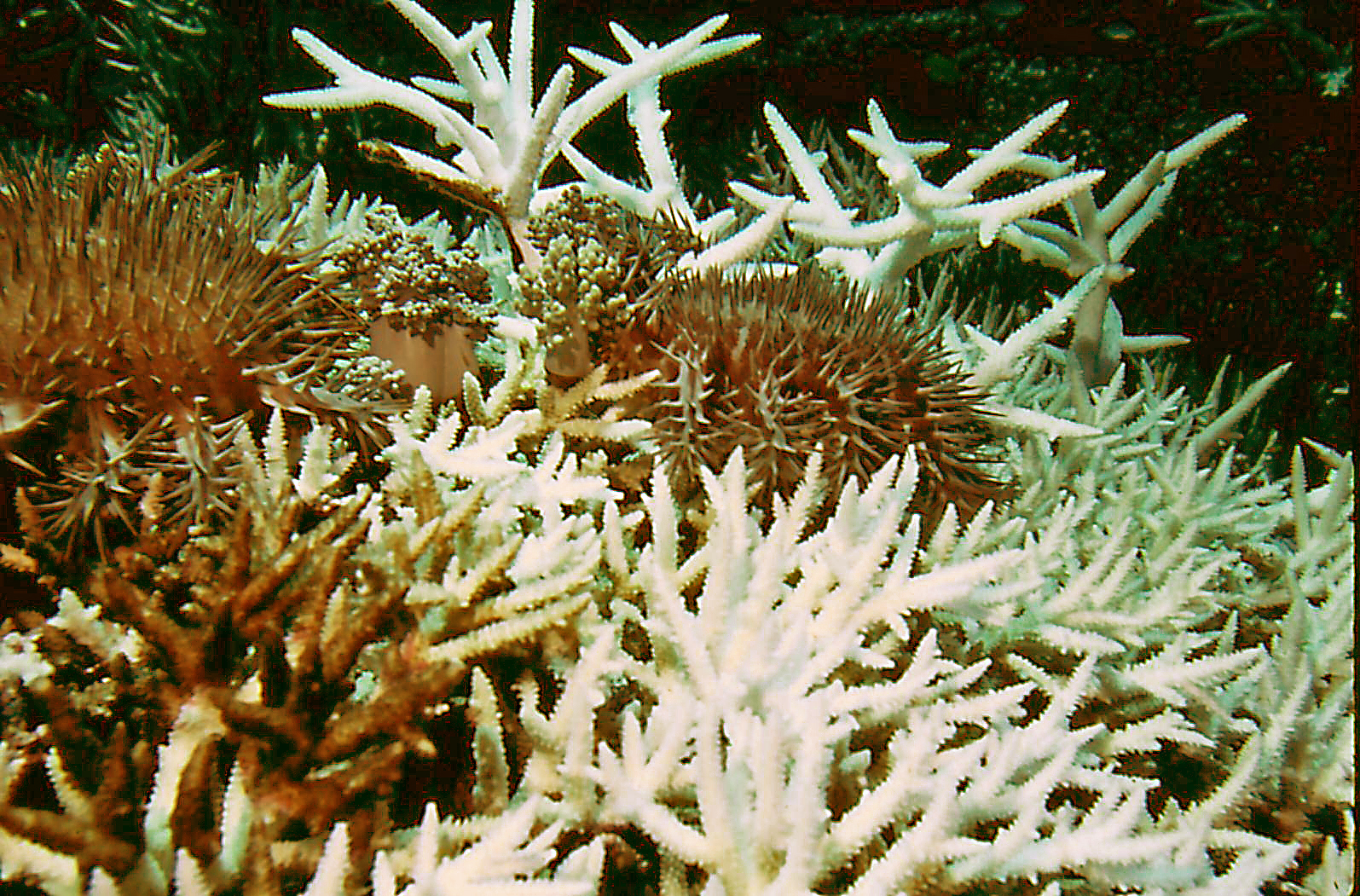
Feeding on branching Acropora coral

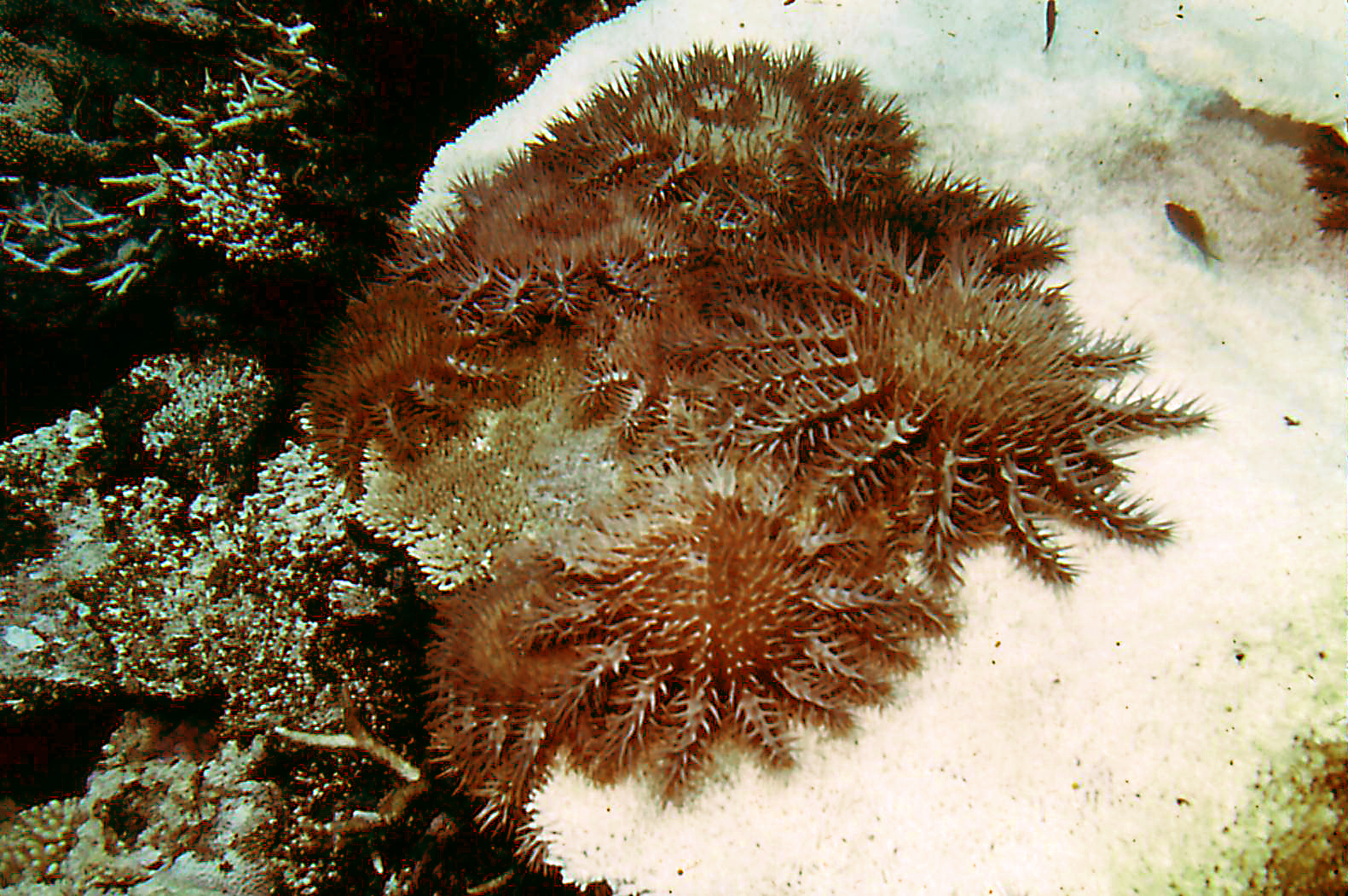
Starfish 'competing' for remaining live coral

The adult crown-of-thorns is a corallivorous predator that usually preys on reef scleractinian coral polyps, as well as encrusting sessile invertebrates and dead animals. It climbs onto a section of living coral colony using the large number of tube feet, which lie in distinct ambulacral grooves on the oral surface. It fits closely to the surface of the coral, even the complex surfaces of branching corals. It then extrudes its stomach out through its mouth over the surface to virtually its own diameter. The stomach surface secretes digestive enzymes that allow the starfish to absorb nutrients from the liquefied coral tissue. This leaves a white scar of coral skeleton that is rapidly infested with filamentous algae. An individual starfish can consume up to 6 square metres (65 sq ft) of living coral reef per year. In a study of feeding rates on two coral reefs in the central Great Barrier Reef region, large starfish (40 cm (16 in) and greater diameter) killed about 61 cm^{2} (9 in^{2})/day in winter and 357 to 478 cm^{2} (55 to 74 in^{2}) per day in summer. Smaller starfish, 20–39 cm (8–15 in), killed 155 to 234 cm^{2} (24 to 36 in^{2}) per day in the equivalent seasons. The area killed by the large starfish is equivalent to about 10 m^{2} (108 sq ft) from these observations. Differences in feeding and locomotion rates between summer and winter reflect the fact that the crown-of-thorns, like all marine invertebrates, is a poikilotherm whose body temperature and metabolic rate are directly affected by the temperature of the surrounding water. In tropical coral reefs, crown-of-thorns specimens reach mean locomotion rates of 35 cm/min (14 in/min), which explains how outbreaks can damage large reef areas in relatively short periods.

The starfish show preferences between the hard corals on which they feed. They tend to feed on branching corals and table-like corals, such as Acropora, Pavona, and Pocillopora species, rather than on more rounded corals with less exposed surface area, such as Porites species. Avoidance of Porites and some other corals may also be due to resident bivalve mollusks and polychaete worms in the surface of the coral, which discourage the starfish. Similarly, some symbionts, such as small crabs, living within the complex structures of branching corals, may ward off the starfish as it seeks to spread its stomach over the coral surface.

In reef areas of low densities of hard coral, reflecting the nature of the reef community or due to feeding by high-density crown-of-thorns, the starfish may be found feeding on soft corals (Octocorallia).

The starfish are cryptic in behavior during their first two years, emerging at night to feed. They usually remain so as adults when solitary. The only evidence of a hidden individual may be white feeding scars on adjacent coral. However, their behavior changes under two circumstances:

- During the breeding season, which is typically during early to midsummer, the starfish may gather together high on a reef and synchronously release gametes to achieve high levels of egg fertilization. This pattern of synchronized spawning is very common amongst marine invertebrates that do not copulate. Solitary spawning gives no opportunity for fertilization of eggs and wastes gametes and evidence exists of a spawning pheromone that causes the starfish to aggregate and release gametes synchronously.
- When the starfish are at high densities, they may move day and night, competing for living coral.

"A. planci forages on corals at a high rate, especially when high populations occur, therefore resulting in loss of reef habitats and overall loss of species diversity. Research shows that when such populations of these starfish are found, they can destroy coral and alter the structure of reefs and its support marine organism.

=== Predators ===
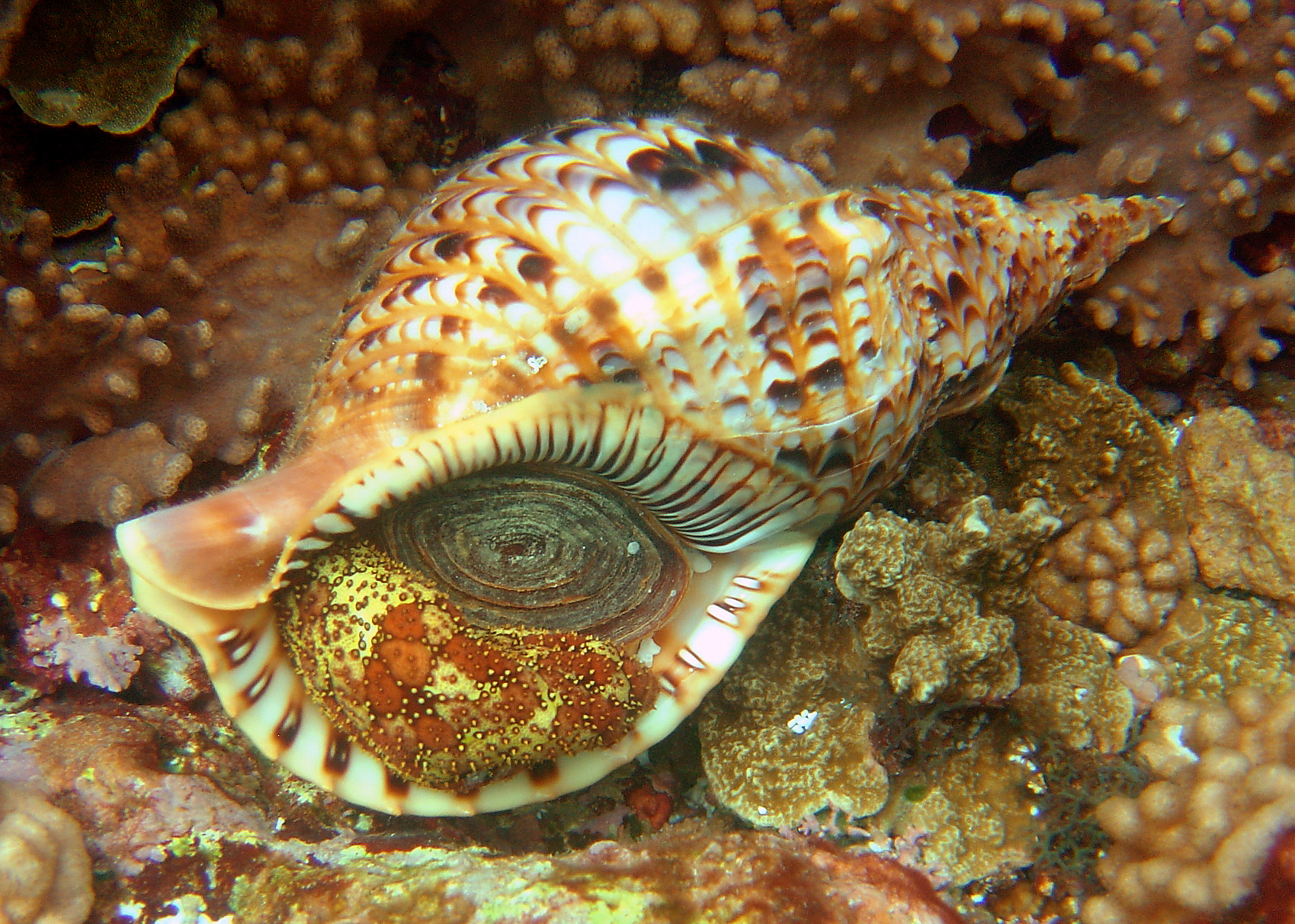
Triton's trumpet (Charonia tritonis) is one of the main predators of A. planci

The elongated, sharp spines covering nearly the entire upper surface of the crown-of-thorns starfish serve as a mechanical defense against large predators. They also have a chemical defense. Saponins presumably serve as an irritant when the spines pierce a predator, in the same way as they do when they pierce the skin of humans. Saponins have an unpleasant taste. A study to test the predation rate on juvenile Acanthaster spp. by appropriate fish species found that the starfish were often mouthed, tasted, and rejected. These defenses tend to make it an unattractive target for coral community predators. In spite of this, however, Acanthaster populations are typically composed of a proportion of individuals with regenerating arms.

External videos
- Giant Triton hunting Crown-of-thorns starfish Love Nature

About 11 species have been reported to prey occasionally on uninjured and healthy adults of A. planci. All of these are generalist feeders, but none of these seem to specifically prefer the starfish as a food source. This number, however, is probably lower, as some of these presumed predators have not been witnessed reliably in the field. Some of those witnessed are:

- A species of pufferfish and two triggerfish have been observed to feed on crown-of-thorns starfish in the Red Sea; although they may have some effect on the A. planci population, no evidence exists of systematic predation. In the Indo-Pacific waters, white-spotted puffers, and Titan triggerfish have also been found to eat this starfish.
- Triton's trumpet, a very large gastropod mollusk, is a known predator of Acanthaster in some parts of the starfish's range. The Triton has been described as tearing the starfish to pieces with its file-like radula.
- The small painted shrimp Hymenocera picta, a general predator of starfish, has been found to prey on A. planci at some locations. A polychaete worm, Pherecardia striata, was observed to be feeding on the starfish together with the shrimp on an east Pacific coral reef. About 0.6% of the starfish in the reef population were being attacked by both the shrimp and polychaete worm, killing the starfish in about a week. Glynn suggested this resulted in a balance between mortality and recruitment in this population, leading to a relatively stable population of starfish.
- Since P. striata can only attack a damaged A. planci and cause its death, it may be regarded as an "impatient scavenger" rather than a predator. As distinct from predators, dead and mutilated adults of A. planci attract a number of scavengers. Glynn lists two polychaete worms, a hermit crab, a sea urchin, and seven species of small reef fish. Apparently, they are able to tolerate the distasteful saponins for an easy meal.
- A large, polyp-like creature of the cnidarian genus Paracorynactis was observed attacking and then wholly ingesting a crown-of-thorns starfish of similar size. Continued studies revealed this polyp is able to completely ingest a crown-of-thorns specimen up to 34 cm (13 in) in diameter.

== Lifecycle ==
=== Gametes and embryos ===
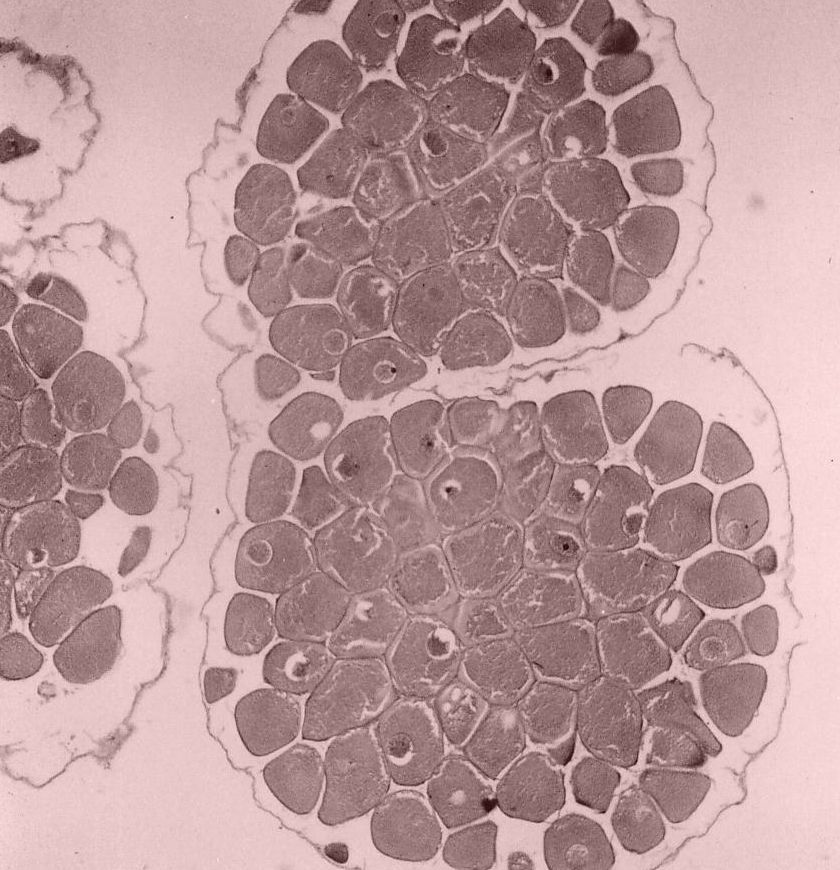
Stained cross-section of ripe ovary full of ova

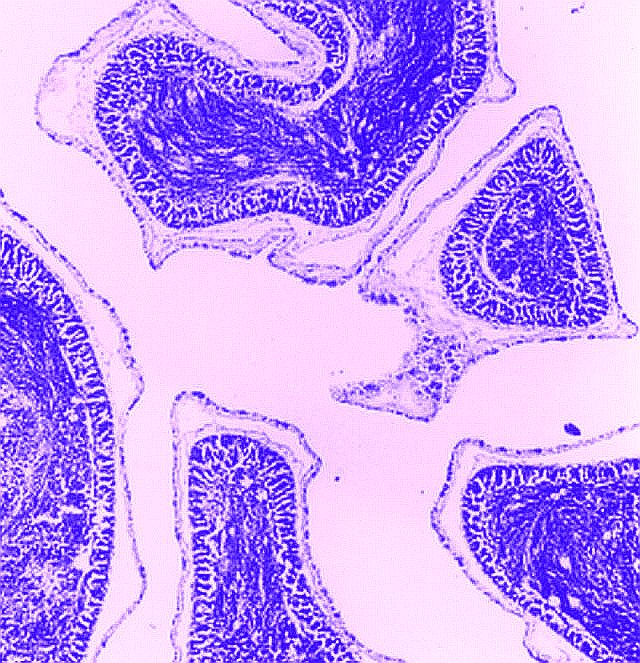
Stained cross-section of testis (sperm are blue)

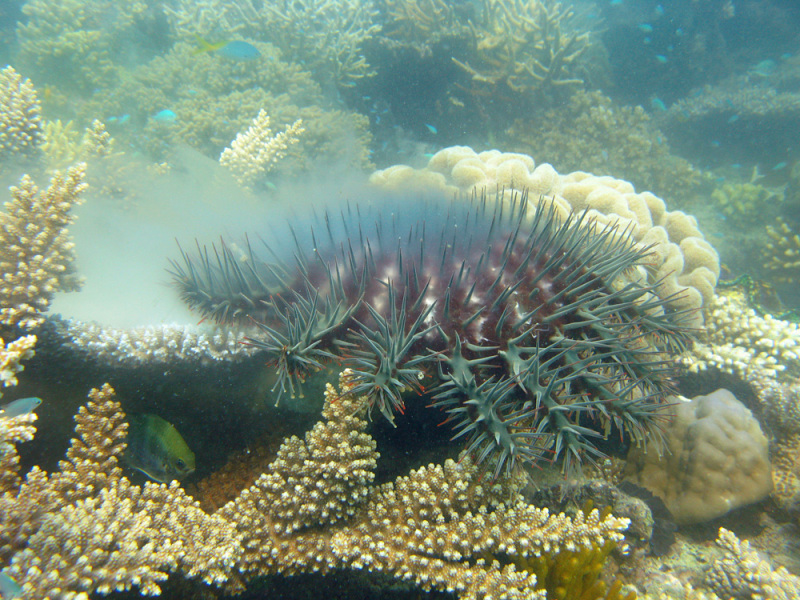
Spawning

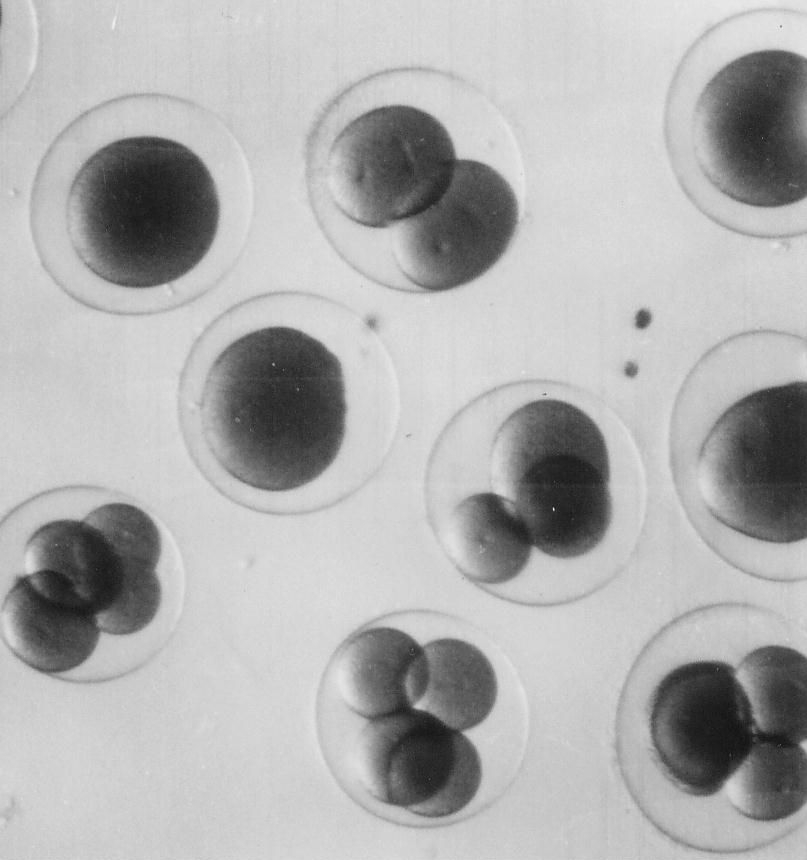
First cell divisions within fertilised eggs, about 0.3 mm in diameter

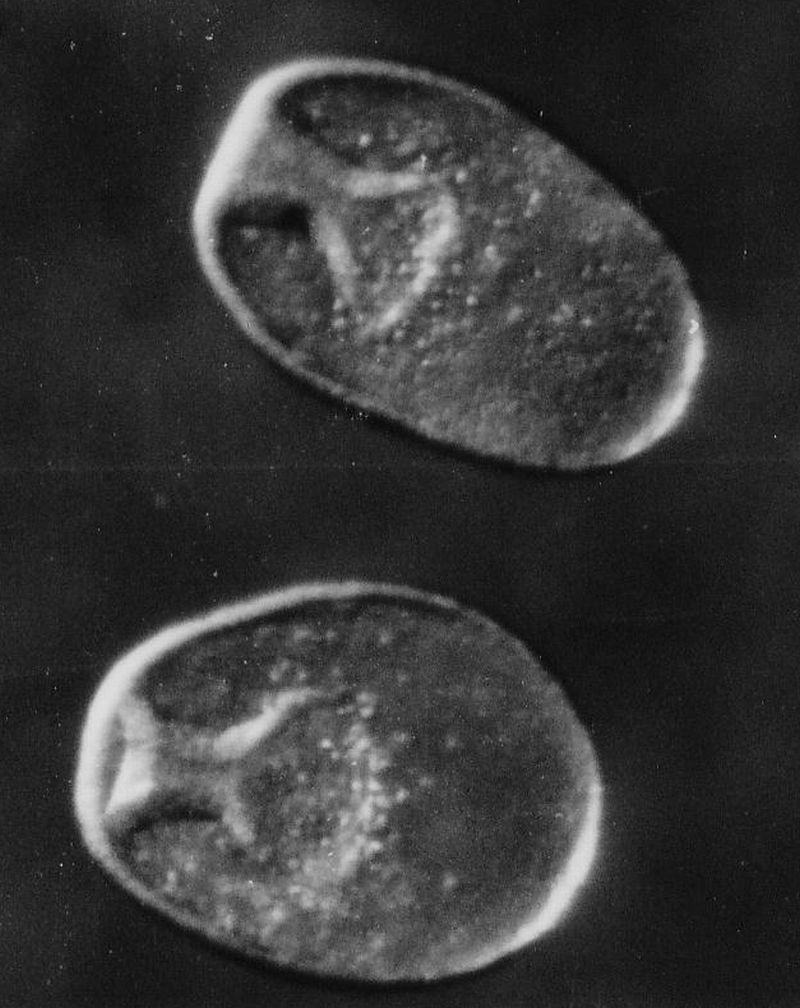
Free-living gastrula stage, about 0.5 mm long

Gonads increase in size as the animals become sexually mature, and at maturity, fill the arms and extend into the disk region. The ripe ovaries and testes are readily distinguishable, with the former being more yellow and having larger lobes. In section, they are very different, with the ovaries densely filled with nutrient-packed ova (see ovum and photograph) and the testes densely filled with sperm, which consist of little more than a nucleus and flagellum. Fecundity in female crown-of-thorns starfish is related to size, with large starfish committing proportionally more energy into ova production such that:

- A 200-mm-diameter female produces 0.5–2.5 million eggs, representing 2–8% of her wet weight.
- A 300-mm-diameter female produces 6.5–14 million eggs, representing 9–14% of her wet weight.
- A 400-mm-diameter female produces 47–53 million eggs, representing 20–25% of her wet weight.

Close-up of a male spawning. Sperm is visible pouring from gonopores on the upper disc surface

In coral reefs in the Philippines, female specimens were found with a gonadosomatic index (ratio of gonad mass to body mass) as high as 22%, which underlines the high fecundity of this starfish. Babcock et al. (1993) monitored changes in fecundity and fertility (fertilisation rate) over the spawning season of the crown-of-thorns starfish on Davies Reef, central Great Barrier Reef, from 1990 to 1992. The starfish were observed to spawn from December to January (early to midsummer) in this region with most observations being in January. However, both gonadosomatic index and fertility peaked early and declined to low levels by late January, indicating that most successful reproductive events took place early in the spawning season. In Northern Hemisphere coral reefs, however, crown-of-thorns populations reproduce in April and May, and were also observed spawning in the Gulf of Thailand in September. High rates of egg fertilisation may be achieved through the behaviour of proximate and synchronised spawning (see above in Behaviour). Spawning is influenced by environmental cues such as changes in water temperatures and lunar events.

Embryonic development begins about 1.5 hours after fertilisation, with the early cell divisions (cleavage). By 8–9 hours, it has reached the 64-cell stage. Some molecular and histological evidence suggests the occurrence of hermaphroditism in Acanthaster cf. solaris.

=== Larval stages ===
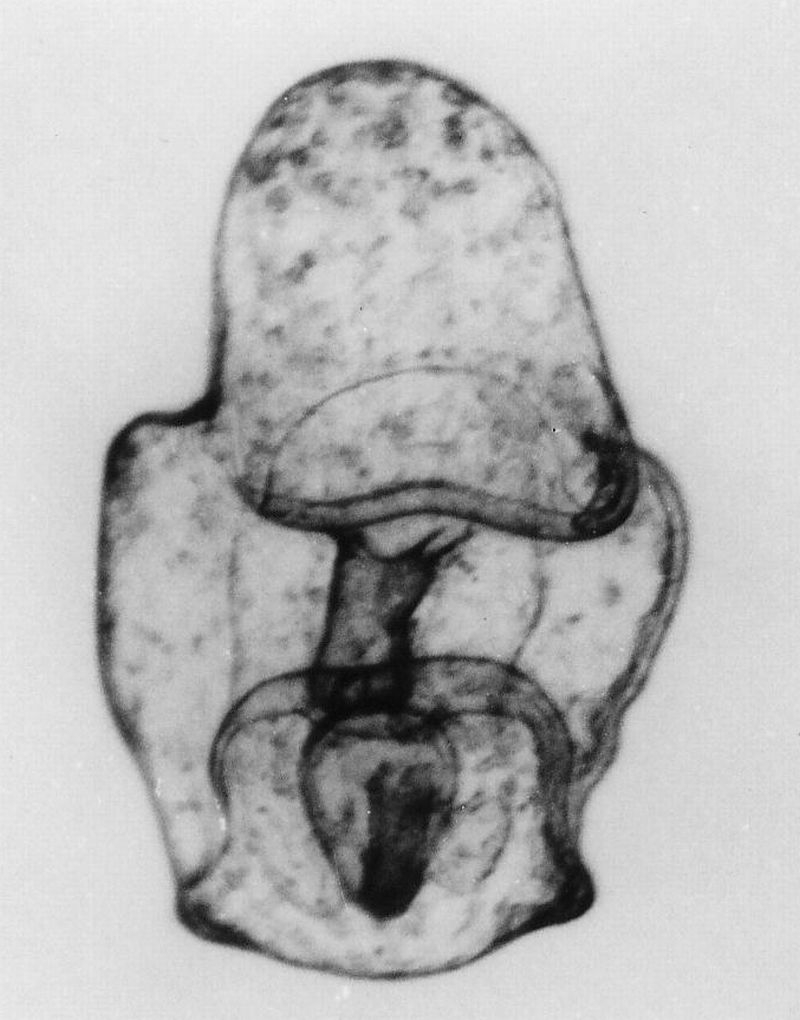
Bipinnaria larva

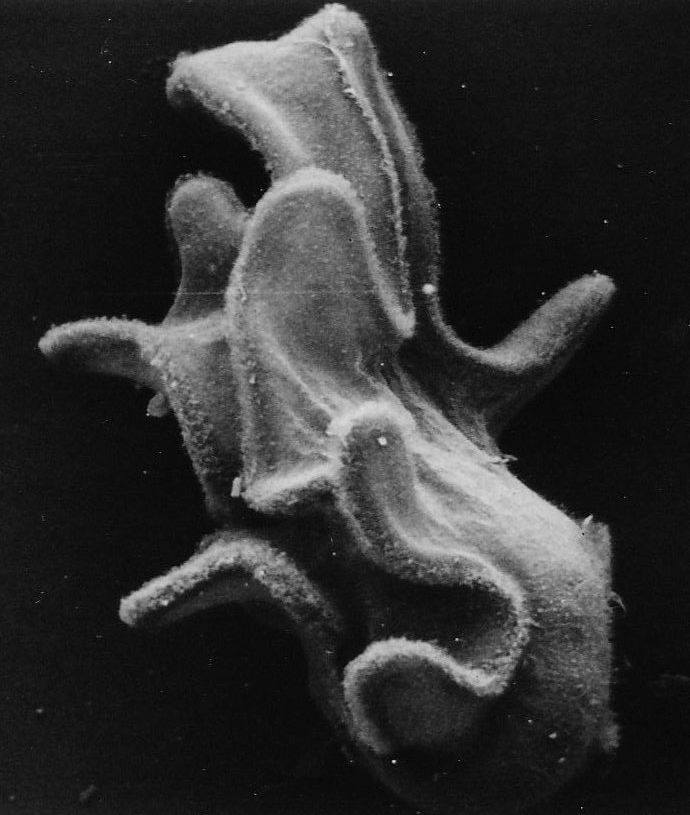
Scanning electron microscope (SEM) of bipinnaria larva

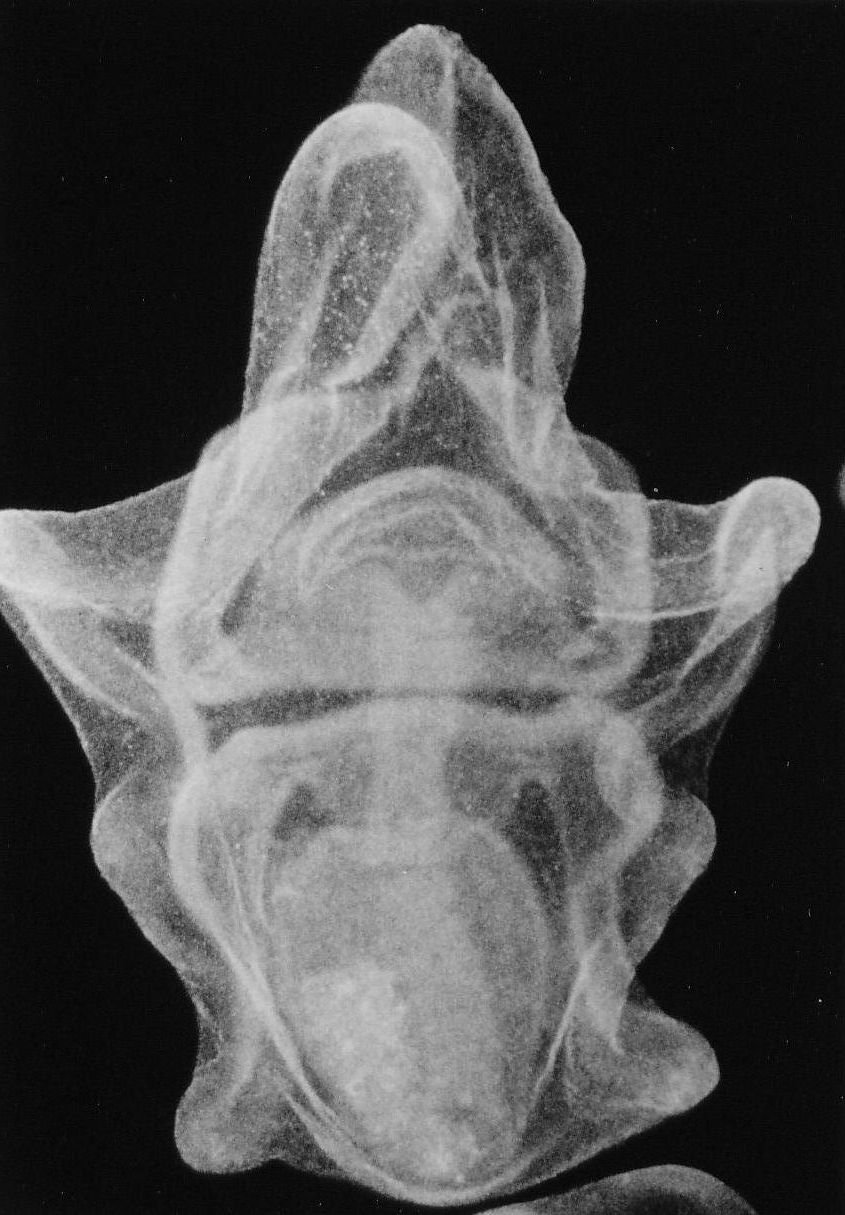
Brachiolaria larva

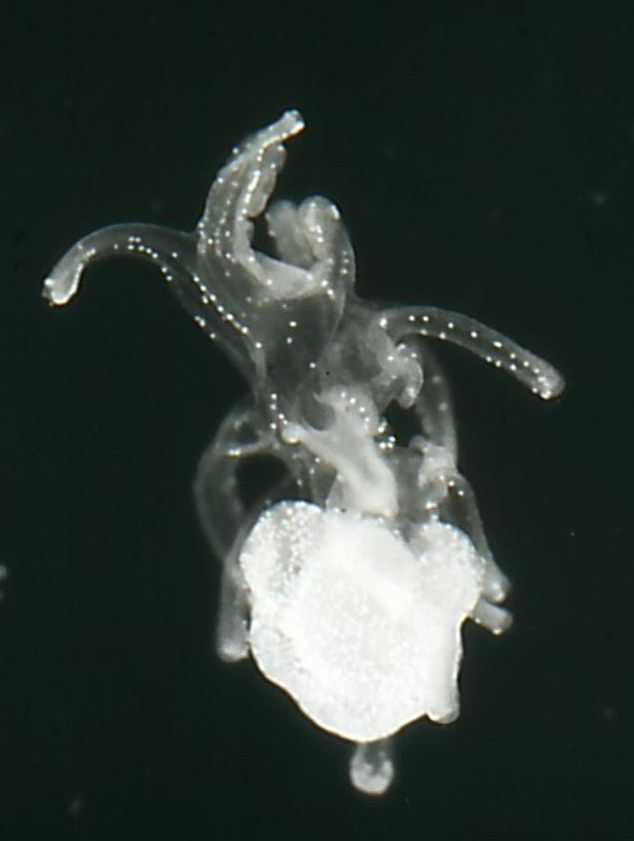
Late brachiolaria with starfish primordium

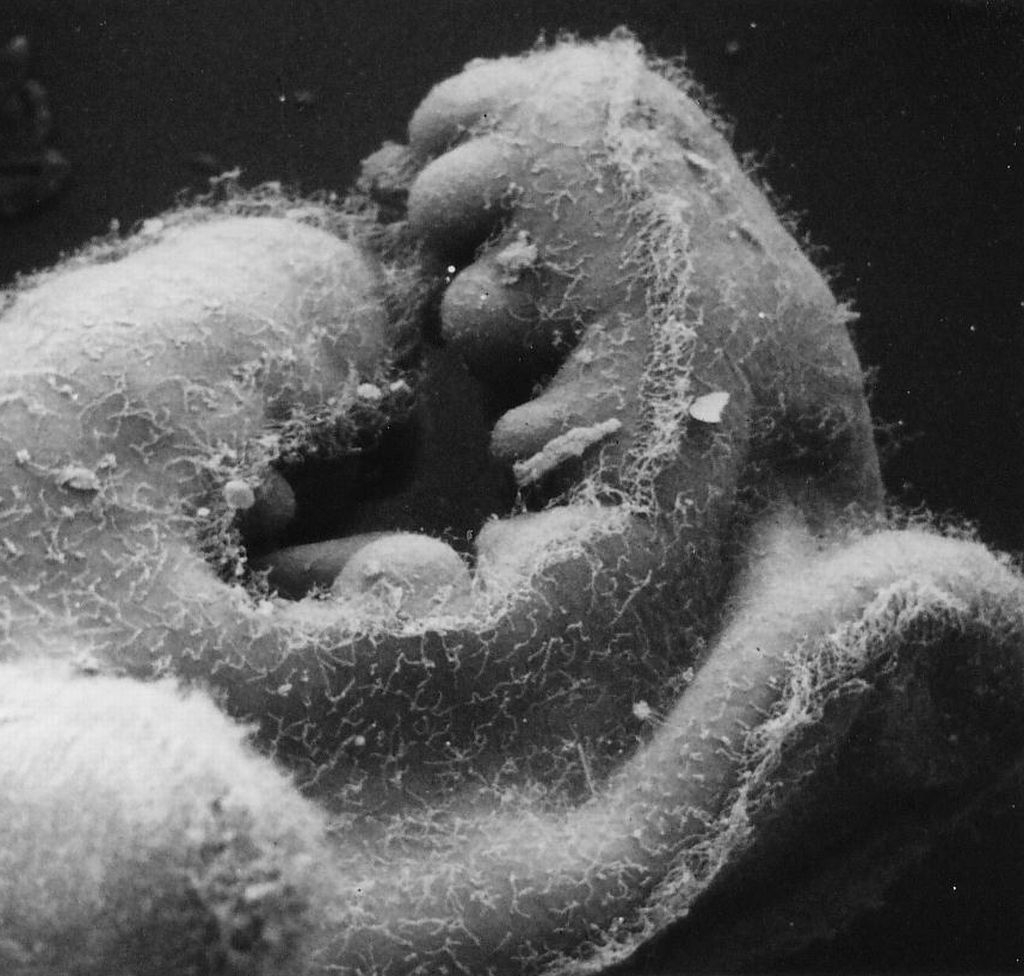
SEM of brachiolarian arms

By day 1, the embryo has hatched as a ciliated gastrula stage (photograph). By day 2, the gut is complete and the larva is now known as a bipinnaria. It has ciliated bands along the body and uses these to swim and filter feed on microscopic particles, particularly unicellular green flagellates (phytoplankton). The scanning electron micrograph (SEM) clearly shows the complex ciliated bands of the bipinnarial larva. By day 5, it is an early brachiolarial larva. The arms of the bipinnaria have further elongated, two stump-like projections are in the anterior (not evident in the photograph), and structures are developing within the posterior of the larva. In the late brachiolarial larva (day 11), the larval arms are elongated and three distinctive arms occur at the anterior with small structures on their inner surfaces. To this stage, the larva has been virtually transparent, but the posterior section is now opaque with the initial development of a starfish. The late brachiolaria is 1.0–1.5 mm. It tends to sink to the bottom and test the substrate with its brachiolar arms, including flexing the anterior body to orient the brachiolar arms against the substrate.

This description and assessment of optimum rate of development is based on early studies in the laboratory under attempted optimum conditions. However, not unexpectedly, there are large differences in growth rate and survival under various environmental conditions (see Causes of population outbreaks).

=== Metamorphosis, development, and growth ===
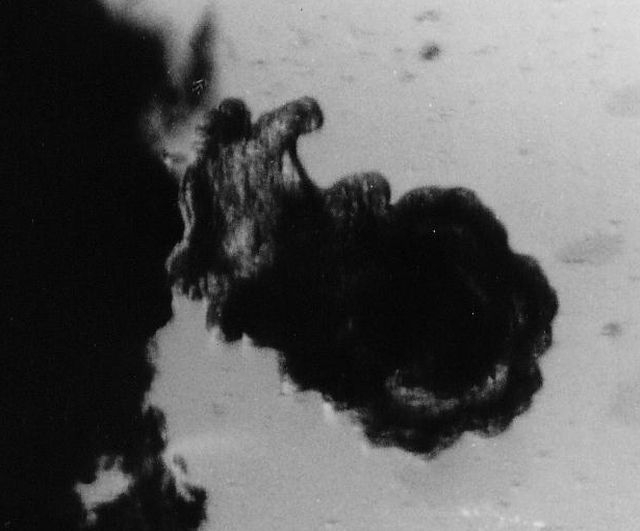
Settling brachiolarial larva

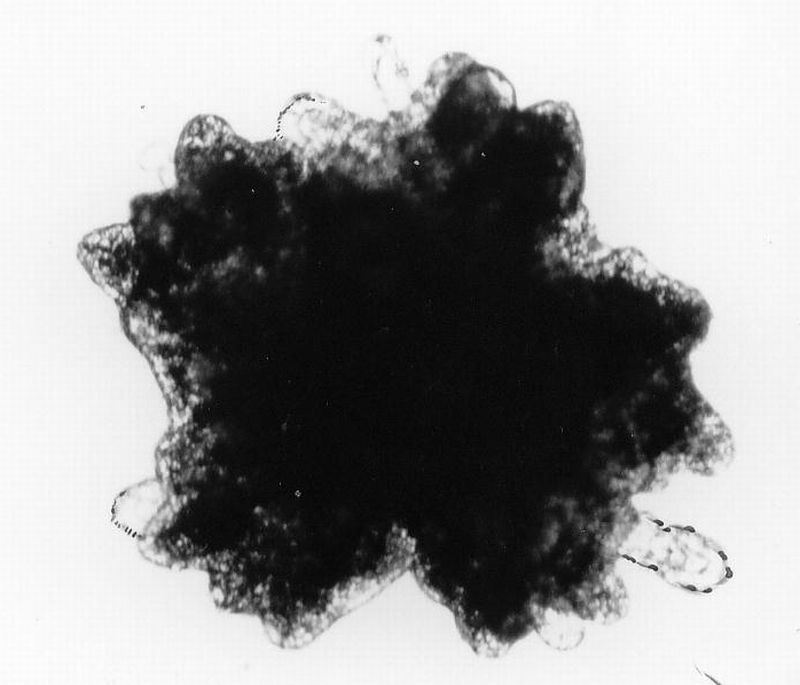
A five-armed juvenile starfish immediately after metamorphosis

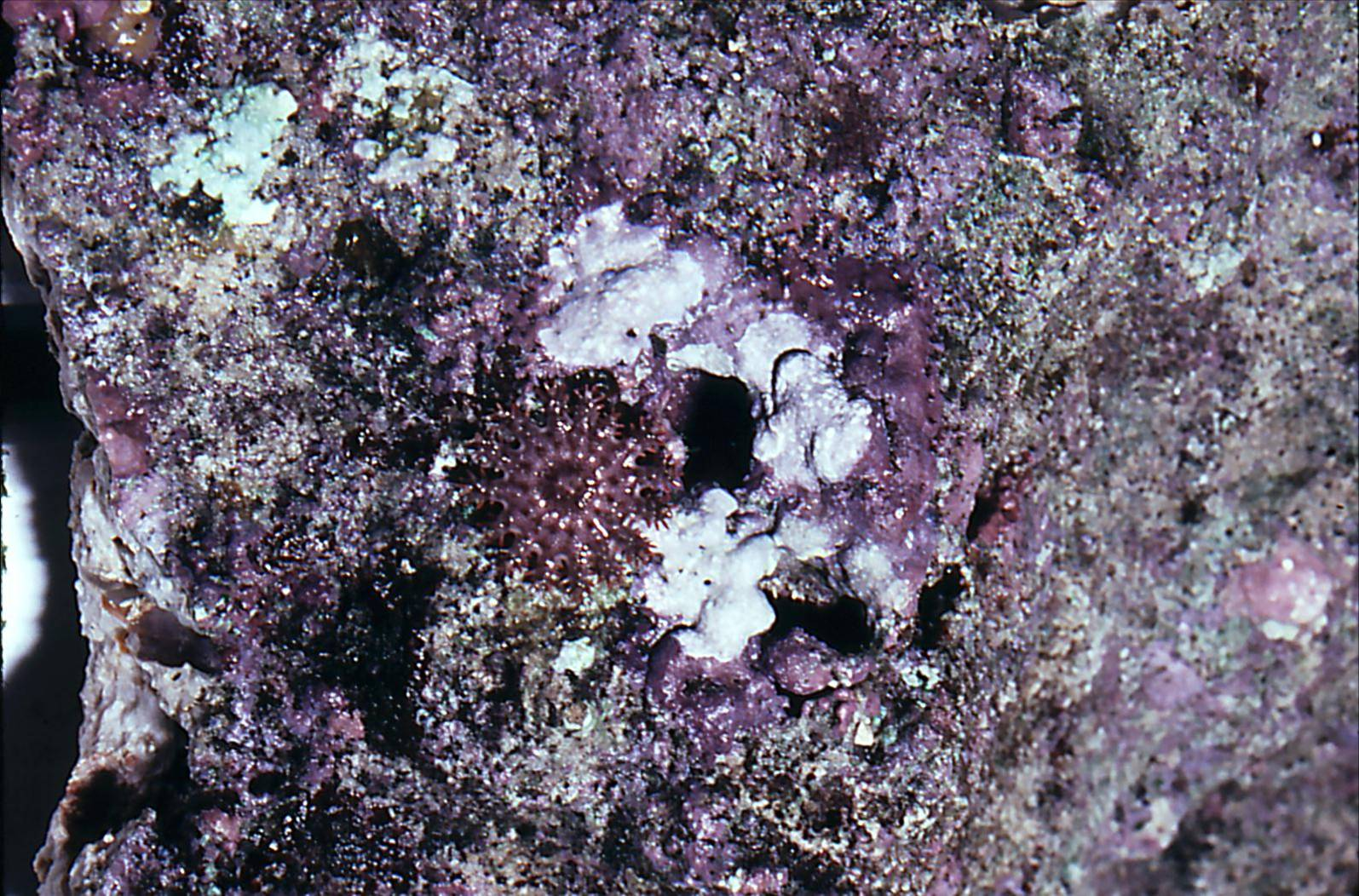
Early juvenile starfish feeding on coralline algae (leaving behind white feeding scars)

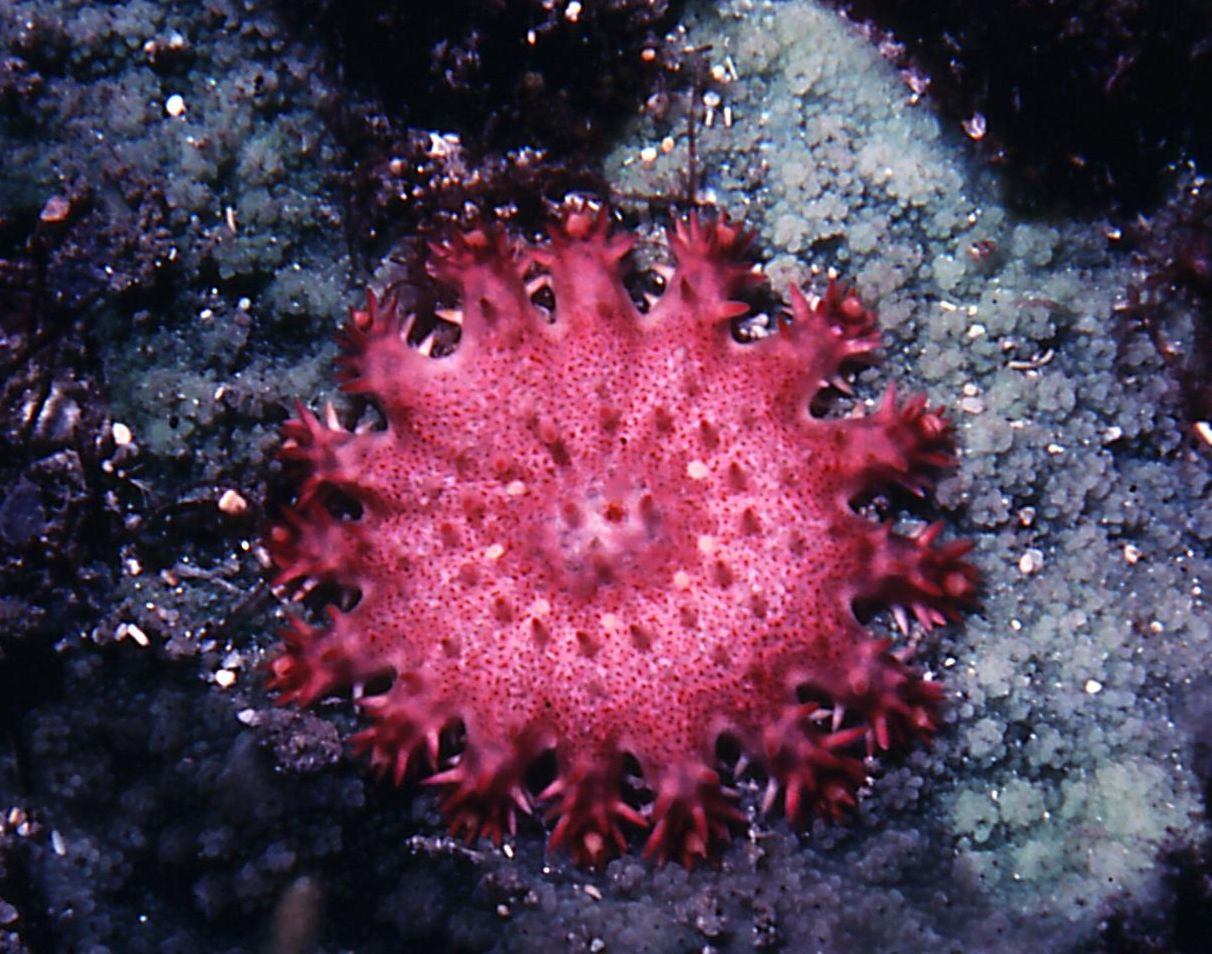
Coral-feeding juvenile with full set of arms and madreporites

Underside of juvenile

The late brachiolaria search substrates with their arms, and when offered a choice of substrates, tend to settle on coralline algae, on which they subsequently feed. In the classic pattern for echinoderms, the bilaterally symmetrical larva is replaced by a pentamerously symmetrical stage at metamorphosis, with the latter's body axis bearing no relationship to that of the larva. Thus, the newly metamorphosed starfish are five-armed and are 0.4–1.0 mm in diameter. (Note the size of the tube feet relative to the size of the animal.) They feed on the thin coating layers of hard, encrusting algae (coralline algae) on the undersides of dead coral rubble and other concealed surfaces. They extend their stomach over the surface of the encrusting algae and digest the tissue, as in the feeding by larger crown-of-thorns starfish on hard corals. The living tissue of the encrusting algae is approximately pink to dark red, and feeding by these early juveniles results in white scars on the surface of the algae. During the next months, the juveniles grow and add arms and associated madreporites in the pattern described by Yamaguchi until the adult numbers are attained 5–7 months after metamorphosis. Two hard corals with small polyps, Pocillopora damicornis and Acropora acunimata, were included in the aquaria with the encrusting algae, and at about the time the juvenile starfish achieved their full number of arms, they began feeding on the corals.

External videos
- Juveniles of crown-of-thorns starfish Australian Institute of Marine Science

Juveniles of A. planci that had reached the stage of feeding on coral were then reared for some years in the same large closed-circuit seawater system that was used for the early juveniles. They were moved to larger tanks and kept supplied with coral so that food was not a limiting factor on growth rate. The growth curves of size versus age were sigmoidal, as seen in majority marine invertebrates. An initial period of relatively slow growth occurred while the starfish were feeding on coralline algae. This was followed by a phase of rapid growth, which led to sexual maturity at the end of the second year. The starfish were in the vicinity of 200 mm in diameter at this stage. They continued to grow rapidly and were around 300 and tended to decline after 4 years. Gonad development was greater in the third and subsequent years than at 2 years, and a seasonal pattern of gametogenesis and spawning became apparent, with water temperature being the only notable cue in the indoor aquarium. Most specimens of A. planci died from "senility" during the period 5.0–7.5 years, i.e. they fed poorly and shrank.

=== Field observations of lifecycle ===
The data above are derived from laboratory studies of A. planci, which are much more readily obtained than equivalent data from the field. The laboratory observations, however, are in accord with the limited field observations of lifecycle.

As in laboratory studies where A. planci larvae were found to select coralline algae for settlement, early juveniles (<20 mm in diameter) were found on subtidal coralline algae (Porolithon onkodes) on the windward reef front of Suva Reef (Fiji). The juveniles were found in a variety of habitats where they were highly concealed - under coral blocks and rubble in the boulder zone of the exposed reef front, on dead bases of Acropora species in more sheltered areas, in narrow spaces within the reef crest, and on the fore-reef slope to depths of 8 m.

Growth rates on Suva Reef were found to be 2.6, 16.7 and 5.3 mm/month increase in diameter before coral feeding, in early coral feeding, and in adult phases, respectively. This is in accord with the sigmoidal pattern of size versus age observed in laboratory studies, i.e. slow initial growth, a phase of very rapid growth beginning at coral feeding and tapering off of growth after the starfish reaches sexual maturity. In reefs in the Philippines, female and male specimens matured at 13 and 16 cm, respectively.

Stump identified bands in the upper surface spines of A. planci, and attributed these to annual growth bands. He did not report growth rates based on these age determinations, and mark and recapture data, but he reported that the growth bands revealed 12+ year-old starfish: much older than those that became 'senile' and died in the laboratory.

In a small number of field studies, mortality rates of juvenile A. planci have to found to be very high, e.g. 6.5% per day for month-old and 0.45% per day for 7-month-old. Most of the mortality comes from predators, such as small crabs, that occur in and on the substrate with the juveniles. It is possible, however, that these rates may not reflect mortality over the range of habitats occupied by small juveniles.

== Ecology ==
=== Ecological impact on reefs ===
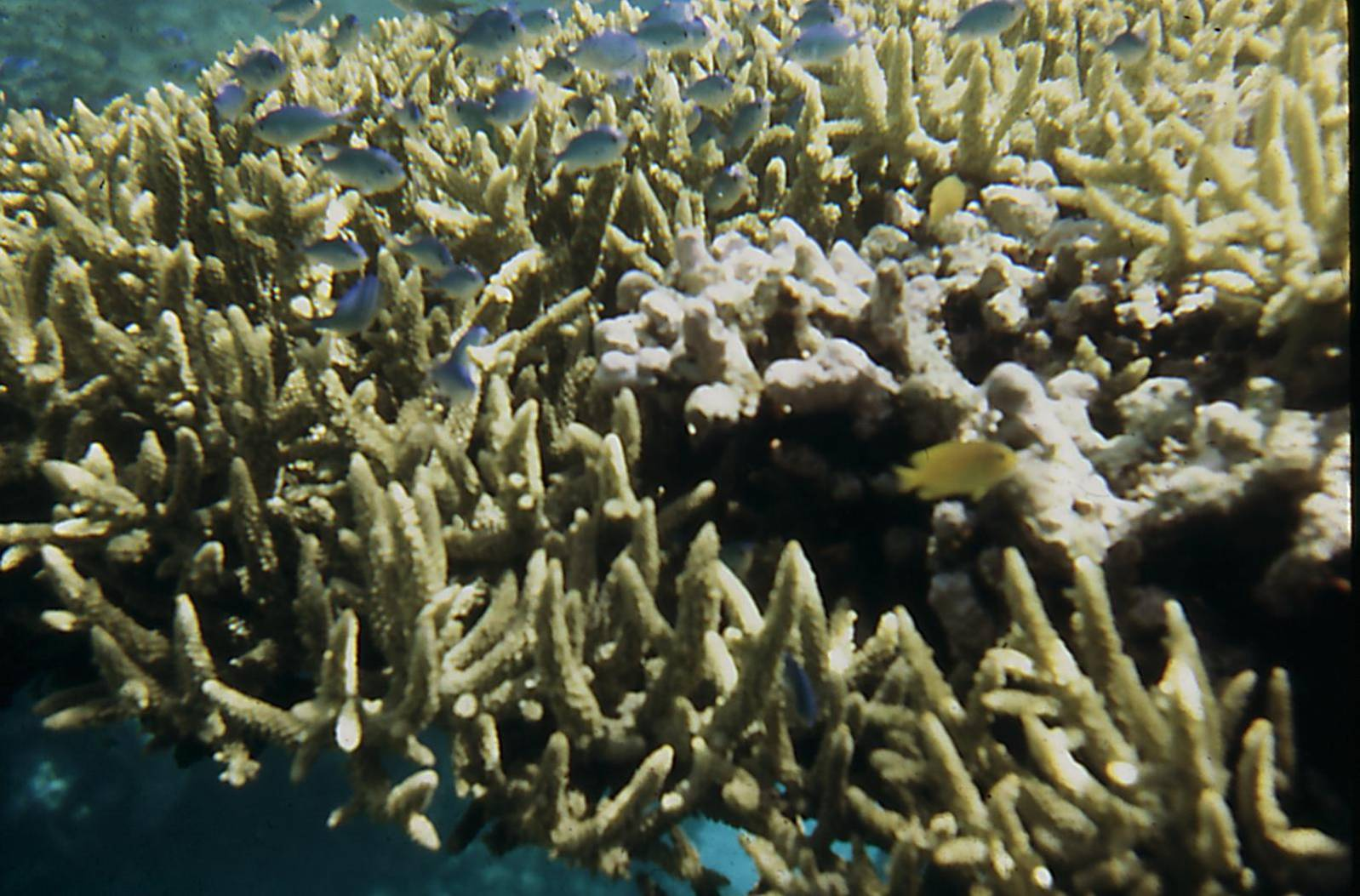
Coral before A. planci predation

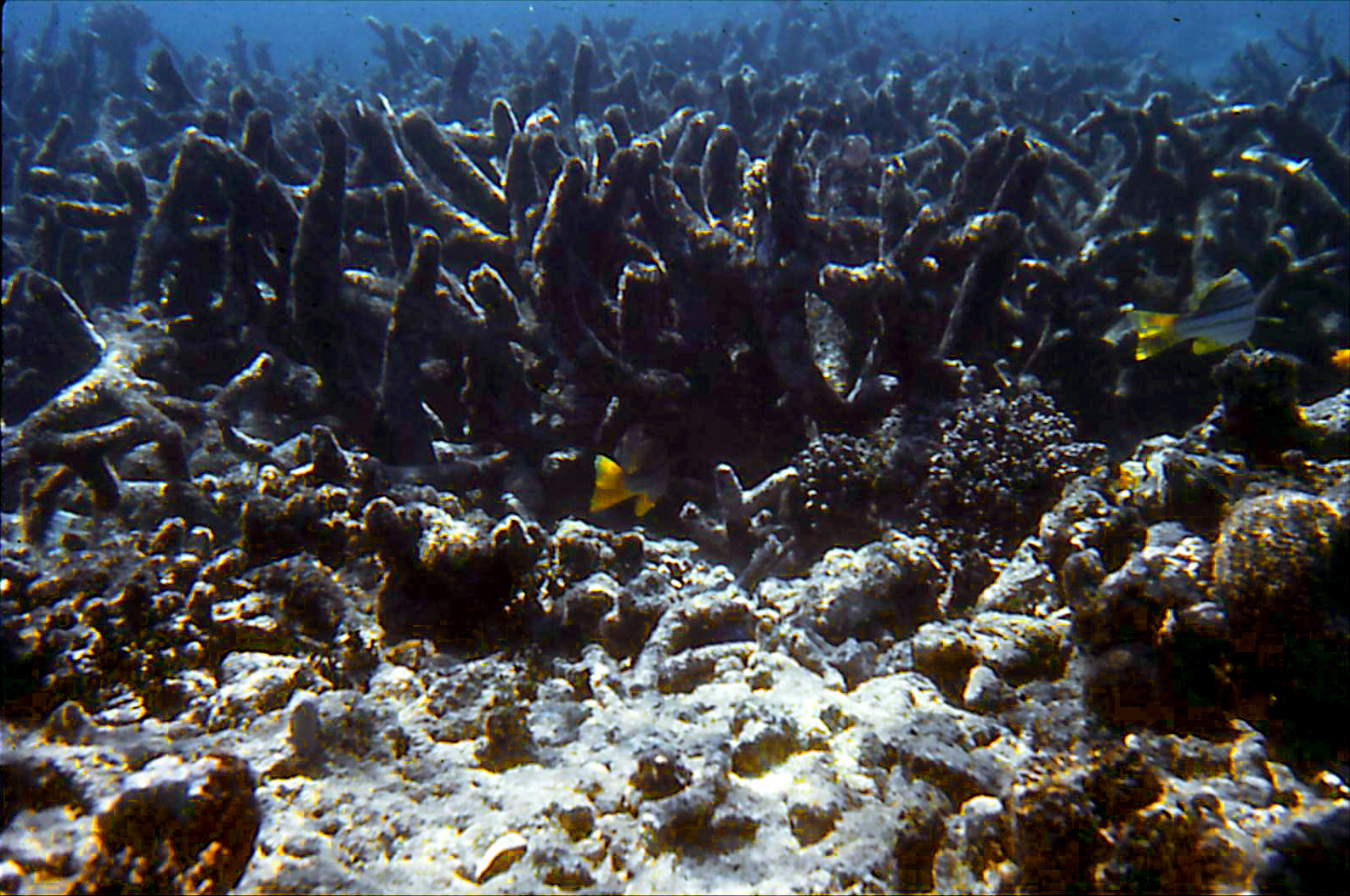
Filamentous algae encrusting coral skeletons after A. planci predation

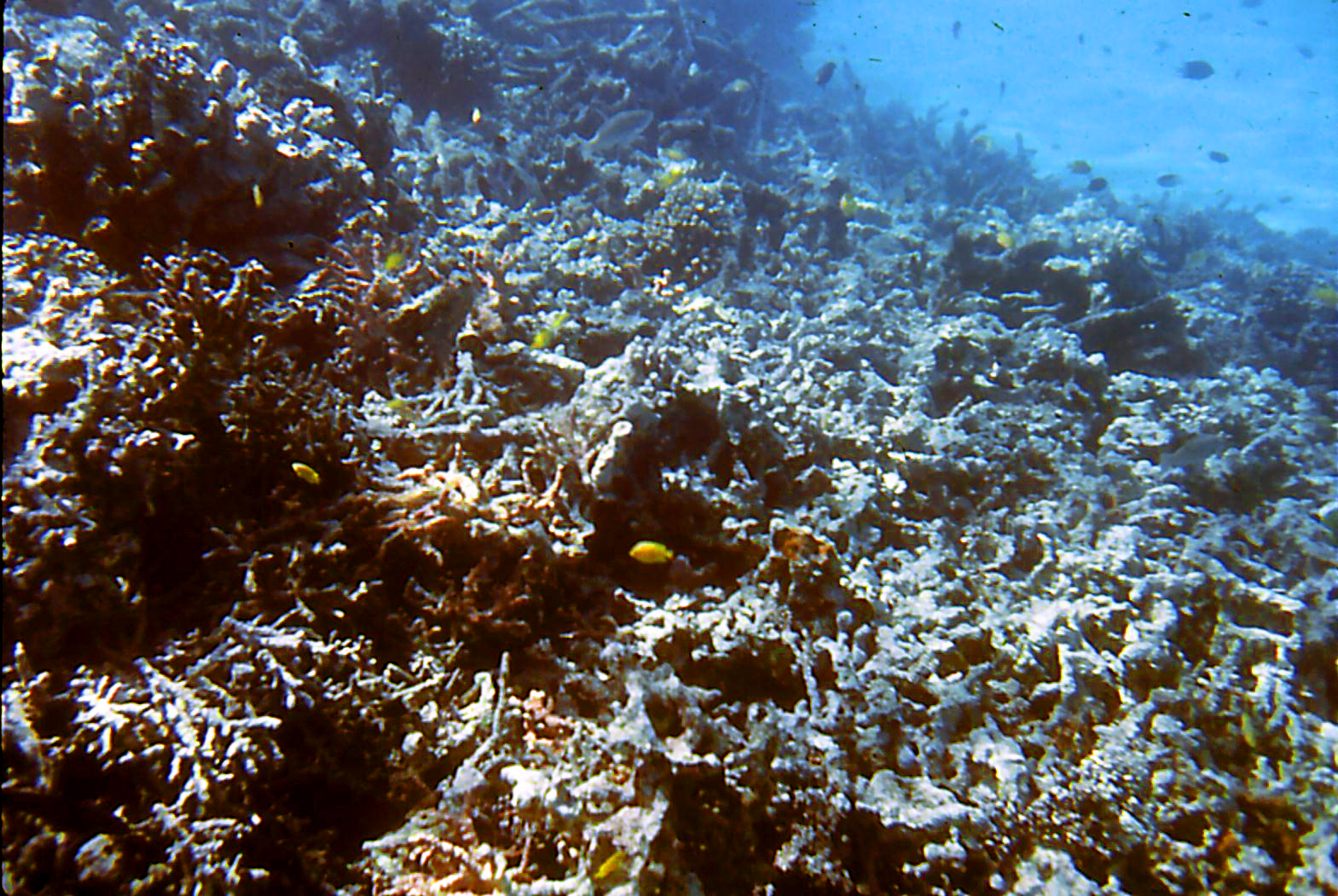
Collapsed coral skeletons after A. planci predation and storm

A. planci is one of the most efficient predators on scleractinias (stony corals or hard corals). Most coral-feeding organisms only cause tissue loss or localized injuries, but adults of A. planci can kill entire coral colonies.

In 1960-1965, marine scientist Robert Endean reported high densities of A. planci on the Great Barrier Reef.. This, along with 1970s book Requiem for the Reef, suggesting that there was a cover-up of the extent of damage, prompted the alarming idea that the coral and with it whole reefs were being destroyed by the starfish. In fact, as described above, the starfish preys on coral by digesting the surface of living tissue from the coral skeletons. These skeletons persist, together with the mass of coralline algae that is essential for reef integrity. The initial change (first-order effect) is loss of the veneer of living coral tissue.

External videos
- Deadly Starfish Eats Coral: Crown of Thorns Starfish (COTS) crisis Khaled bin Sultan Living Oceans Foundation

A. planci is a component of the fauna of most coral reefs and the effects of A. planci populations on coral reefs are very dependent on the population density. At low densities (1 to perhaps 30/hectare) the rate at which coral is being preyed upon by the starfish, is less than the growth rate of the coral, i.e. the surface area of living coral is increasing. The starfish may, however, influence the coral community structure. Because the starfish do not feed indiscriminately, they may cause a distribution of coral species and colony sizes that differs from a pattern without them. This is evident by comparison of coral reefs where A. planci has not been found to the more typical reefs with A. planci.

Some ecologists suggest that the starfish has an important and active role in maintaining coral reef biodiversity, driving ecological succession. Before overpopulation became a significant issue, crown-of-thorns prevented fast-growing coral from overpowering the slower-growing coral varieties.

At high densities (outbreaks, plagues), which may be defined as when the starfish are too abundant for the coral food supply, coral cover goes into decline. The starfish must broaden their diet from their preferred species, colony size, and shape. The starfish often aggregate during feeding, even at low densities, but during high densities, the cleared coral patches become almost or completely continuous. Second-order effects exist for these large areas of preyed coral:

- The bare coral skeletons are rapidly colonised by filamentous algae.
- Large stands of staghorn coral, Acropora species, may collapse and become rubble, reducing the topographical complexity of the reef
- Sometimes, the preyed surfaces are further invaded by macroalgae, soft coral, and sponges. These tend to take over reef surfaces for long periods, as alternatives to hard coral communities; once established, they limit recruitment by hard-coral larvae.

Aesthetically, in all the above cases, the reef surface is not as attractive as the living coral surface, but it is anything but dead.

A third-order effect can arise from the invasion by filamentous algae. Animals that depend directly or indirectly on hard corals, e.g. for shelter and food, should lose out, and herbivores and less specialist feeders gain. This likely would be most conspicuous in the fish fauna, and long-terms studies of coral reef-fish communities confirm this expectation.

=== Population outbreaks ===
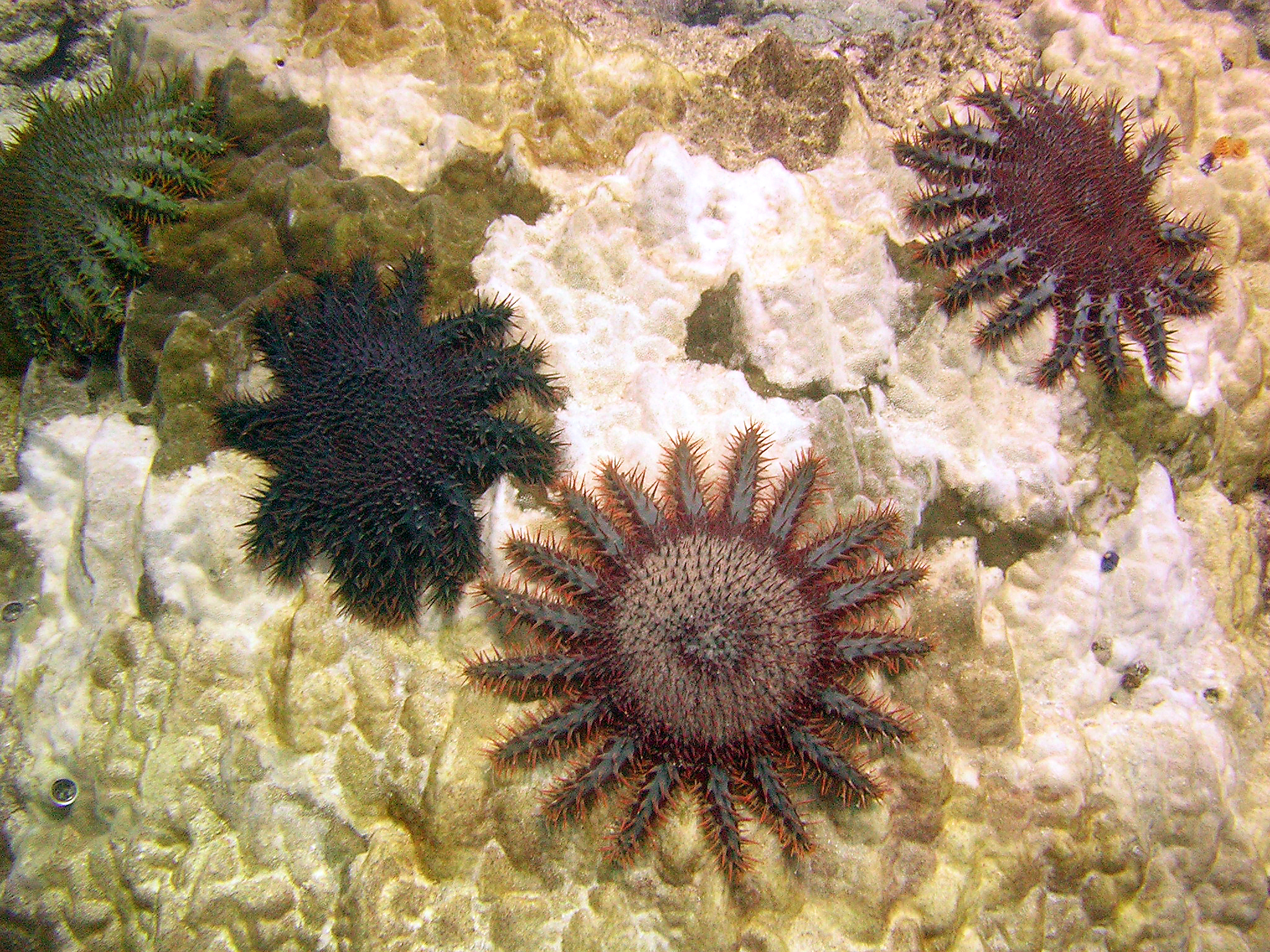
Outbreak in French Polynesia

Large populations of crown-of-thorns starfish (sometimes emotively known as plagues) have been substantiated as occurring at 21 locations of coral reefs during the 1960s to 1980s. These locations ranged from the Red Sea through the tropical Indo-Pacific region to French Polynesia. At least two substantiated repeated outbreaks occurred at 10 of these locations.

Values of starfish density from 140 to 1,000/ha have been considered in various reports to be outbreak populations, while starfish densities less than 100/ha have been considered to be low; however, at densities below 100/ha, feeding by A. planci may exceed the growth of coral with a net loss of coral.

From the surveys of many reef locations throughout the starfish's distribution, large abundances of Acanthaster spp. can be categorised as:

- Primary outbreaks, where abrupt population increases of at least two magnitudes cannot be explained by the presence of a previous outbreak
- Secondary outbreaks can plausibly be related to previous outbreaks through the reproduction of a previous cohort of the starfish. These may appear as recruits to reefs down current from an existing outbreak population.
- Chronic situations where a persistent moderate to high density population exists at a reef location where the coral is sparse due to persistent feeding by the starfish.

The Great Barrier Reef (GBR) is the most outstanding coral reef system in the world because of its great length, number of individual reefs, and species diversity. When high densities of Acanthaster, which were causing heavy mortality of coral, were first seen about Green Island, off Cairns, in 1960–65, this caused considerable alarm. High-density populations were subsequently found of a number of reefs to the south of Green Island, in the central GBR region Some popular publications suggested that the whole reef was in danger of dying, and they influenced and reflected some public alarm over the state and future of the GBR.

A number of studies have modeled the population outbreaks on the GBR as a means to understand the phenomenon. The Australian and Queensland governments funded research and set up advisory committees during the period of great anxiety about the nature of the starfish outbreaks on the GBR. They were regarded as not coming to terms with the unprecedented nature and magnitude of this problem. Many scientists were criticised for not being able to give definitive but unsubstantiated answers. Others were more definitive in their answers. Scientists were criticised for their reticence and for disagreeing on the nature and causes of the outbreaks on the GBR, sometimes described as the "starfish wars".

=== Causes of population outbreaks ===
Serious discussion and some strongly held views mention the causes of this phenomenon. Some hypotheses focused on changes in the survival of juvenile and adult starfish—the "predator removal hypothesis":

- Over-collecting of tritons, a predator of the starfish
- Overfishing of predators of the starfish such as the Humphead wrasse
- Decline in predator populations through habitat destruction
- Warmer sea temperatures enhance larvae development
- Anthropogenic impacts, such as allochthonous nutrient input

Many of the reports of fish preying on Acanthaster are single observations or presumed predation from the nature of the fish. For example, the humphead wrasse may prey on the starfish amongst its more usual diet. Individual puffer fish and trigger fish have been observed to feed crown-of-thorns starfish in the Red Sea, but no evidence has found them to be a significant factor in population control. A study, however, based on the stomach contents of large carnivorous fish that are potential predators of the starfish, found no evidence of the starfish in the fish's guts. These carnivorous fish were caught commercially on the coral reefs on the Gulf of Oman and examined at local fish markets.

One problem with the concept of predators of large juvenile and adult starfish causing total mortality is that the starfish have good regenerative powers and they would not keep still while being eaten. Also, they need to be consumed completely or almost completely to die; 17–60% of starfish in various populations had missing or regenerating arms. Clearly, the starfish experience various levels of sublethal predation. When the damage includes a major section of the disk together with arms, the number of arms regenerating on the disk may be less than the number lost.

Another hypothesis is the "aggregation hypothesis", whereby large aggregations of A. planci appear as apparent outbreaks because they have consumed all the adjacent coral. This seems to imply that apparently a dense population outbreak exists when a more diffuse population outbreak has happened that has been dense enough to comprehensively prey on large areas of hard coral.

Female crown-of-thorns starfish are very fecund. Based on the eggs in ovaries, 200-, 300-. and 400-mm-diameter females potentially spawn around 4, 30, and 50 million eggs, respectively (see also Gametes and embryos). Lucas adopted a different approach, focusing on the survival of the larvae arising from the eggs. The rationale for this approach was that small changes in the survival of larvae and developmental stages would result in very large changes in the adult population, considering two hypothetical situations. About 20 million eggs from a female spawning, having a survival rate around 0.00001% throughout development, would replace two adult starfish in a low-density population where the larvae recruit. If, however, the survival rate increases to 0.1% (one in a thousand) throughout development from one spawning of 20 million eggs, this would result in 20,000 adult starfish where the larvae have recruited. Since the larvae are the most abundant stages of development, changes in survival likely are of most importance during this phase of development.

Temperature and salinity have little effect on the survival of crown-of-thorns larvae. However, abundance and species of the particular component of phytoplankton (unicellular flagellates) on which the larvae feed has a profound effect on survival and rate of growth. The abundance of phytoplankton cells is especially important. As autotrophs, phytoplankton abundance is strongly influenced by the concentration of inorganic nutrients, such as nitrogenous compounds.

Charles Birkeland had observed a correlation between the abundance of crown-of-thorns on reefs adjacent to land masses. These occurred on mainland islands as distinct from coral atolls about three years after heavy rainfall that followed a period of drought. He suggested that runoff from such heavy rainfall may stimulate phytoplankton blooms of sufficient size to produce enough food for the larvae of A. planci through input of nutrients. Combining Birkeland's observations with the influence of inorganic nutrients on survival of the starfish larvae in experimental studies gave support for a mechanism for starfish outbreaks:

increased terrestrial runoff → increased nutrients denser phytoplankton↑→ better larval survival → increased starfish populations

Further of these connections have been confirmed, but research by Olson (1987), Kaufmann (2002), and Byrne (2016) suggests terrestrial runoff has little or no impact on larval survival. The conflicting data describing the negligible role of terrestrial agricultural runoff have been described as "an inconvenient study". Also, a flow-on effect is seen in that where large starfish populations produce large numbers of larvae, heavy recruitment is likely on reefs downstream to which the larvae are carried and then settle.

== Population control ==
A. planci removed from coral reefs around (Cook Islands)

Population numbers for the crown-of-thorns have been increasing since the 1970s. Historic records of distribution patterns and numbers, though, are hard to come by, as SCUBA technology, necessary to conduct population censuses, had only been developed in the previous few decades.

To prevent overpopulation of crown-of-thorns causing widespread destruction to coral reef habitats, humans have implemented a variety of control measures. Manual removals have been successful, but are relatively labour-intensive. Injecting sodium bisulfate into the starfish is the most efficient measure in practice. Sodium bisulfate is deadly to crown-of-thorns, but it does not harm the surrounding reef and oceanic ecosystems. To control areas of high infestations, teams of divers have had kill rates of up to 120 per hour per diver. The practice of dismembering them was shown to have a kill rate of 12 per hour per diver, and the diver performing this test was spiked three times. As a result, dismemberings are discouraged for this reason, and not because of rumours that they might be able to regenerate.

An even more labour-intensive route, but less risky to the diver, is to bury them under rocks or debris. This route is only suitable for areas with low infestation and if materials are available to perform the procedure without damaging corals.

A 2015 study by James Cook University showed that common household vinegar is also effective, as the acidity causes the starfish to disintegrate within days. Vinegar is also harmless to the environment, and is not restricted by regulations regarding animal products such as bile. In 2019, divers were using a 10% vinegar solution to reduce starfish populations in the Raja Ampat Islands.

External videos
- 47,000 crown-of-thorns starfish cull in the Great Barrier Reef by TCBS injection (2018) Ecosure

A new successful method of population control is by the injection of thiosulfate-citrate-bile salts-sucrose agar (TCBS). Only one injection is needed, leading to starfish's death in 24 hours from a contagious disease marked by "discoloured and necrotic skin, ulcerations, loss of body turgor, accumulation of colourless mucus on many spines especially at their tip, and loss of spines. Blisters on the dorsal integument broke through the skin surface and resulted in large, open sores that exposed the internal organs." In early 2018, a team of volunteer divers culled 47,000 crown-of-thorns starfish by this method in Swains reef of the Great Barrier Reef.

An autonomous starfish-killing robot called COTSBot has been developed, and as of September 2015, was close to being ready for trials on the GBR. The COTSbot, which has a neural net-aided vision system, is designed to seek out crown-of-thorns starfish and give them a lethal injection of bile salts. After it eradicates the bulk of the starfish in a given area, human divers can move in and remove the survivors. Field trials of the robot have begun in Moreton Bay in Brisbane to refine its navigation system, according to Queensland University of Technology researcher Matthew Dunbabin. No crown-of-thorns starfish are in Moreton Bay, but when the navigation has been refined, the robot will be used on the reef. There is research in Indonesia into the use of ground COTS remains as a fortifying additive to feed for whiteleg shrimp.

== See also ==
- Corallivore
- Environmental issues with coral reefs
