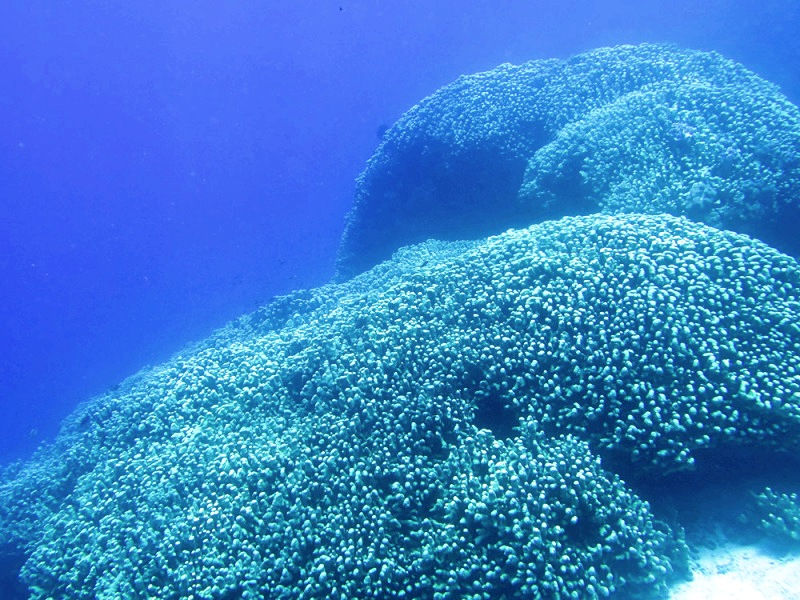
- Pavona clavus colony off the coast of Queensland, Australia

Conservation status
- Least Concern (IUCN 3.1)
- CITES Appendix II

Scientific classification
- Kingdom: Animalia
- Phylum: Cnidaria
- Subphylum: Anthozoa
- Class: Hexacorallia
- Order: Scleractinia
- Family: Agariciidae
- Genus: Pavona
- Species: P. clavus

Binomial name
- Pavona clavus (Dana, 1846)

Synonyms
- Agaricia clavus (Dana, 1846); Lophoseris clavus (Dana, 1846); Pavona (Pavona) clivosa (Verrill, 1869); Pavona (Pseudocolumnastrea) galapagensis Durham & Barnard, 1952; Pavona clivosa (Verrill, 1869); Pavona galapagensis Durham & Barnard, 1952; Pavona lilacea (Klunzinger, 1879); Pavona liliacea (Klunzinger, 1879); Pavona sphaeroidalis (Ortmann, 1889); Pavonia clavus Dana, 1846; Pavonia clivosa Verrill, 1869; Pavonia liliacea Klunzinger, 1879; Siderastraea clava (Dana, 1846); Siderastraea lilacea Klunzinger, 1879; Siderastrea clava (Dana, 1846); Siderastrea clavus (Dana, 1846); Siderastrea lilacea Klunzinger, 1879; Siderastrea sphaeroidalis Ortmann, 1889; Stylocoeniella paumotensis Chevalier, 1975; Tichoseris clavus (Dana, 1846)

= Pavona clavus =

Species of coral

Pavona clavus (common name shoulder blade coral) is a species of colonial stony coral in the family Agariciidae. It is a widespread but uncommon species known from the Indo-Pacific region, the South China Sea, the Red Sea, and the Gulf of Aden. A P. clavus colony in the Solomon Islands is considered to be the world's largest known coral.

== Distribution and habitat ==
Pavona clavus is typically found on coral reefs at depths of 2–40 m (6 ft 7 in – 131 ft 3 in), often on slopes and in areas exposed to currents. It prefers protected or semi-protected habitats and is absent from very shallow, high energy reef platforms.

P. clavus is widely distributed, with its range extending from the western Indian Ocean to the eastern Pacific Ocean along with the South China Sea, the Red Sea, and the Gulf of Aden. This range includes the coasts of eastern Africa and West Asia (including the Comoros, Djibouti, Egypt, Eritrea, Jordan, Kenya, Madagascar, the Maldives, Mauritius, Mayotte, Mozambique, Réunion, Saudi Arabia, Seychelles, Somalia, South Africa, Sudan, Tanzania, and Yemen), Asia (including Brunei, Cambodia, India, Indonesia, Japan, Myanmar, the Philippines, Singapore, Sri Lanka, Taiwan, Thailand, Timor-Leste, and Vietnam) and Oceania (including American Samoa, Australia, the Cook Islands, the Federated States of Micronesia, Fiji, Guam, Kiribati, the Marshall Islands, Nauru, New Caledonia, Niue, the Northern Mariana Islands, Palau, Papua New Guinea, the Pitcairn Islands, Samoa, Solomon Islands, Tokelau, Tonga, Tuvalu, Vanuatu, and Wallis and Futuna), through to western Central America and South America (including Colombia, Costa Rica, Ecuador, El Salvador, Guatemala, Honduras, Mexico, Nicaragua, and Panama).

== Description ==
Pavona clavus is a cream, yellow, brown, or pale grey coral typically forming columnar or club-shaped colonies, though it may also form flattened plates. The columns are generally smooth and uniform in size, typically measuring up to 20 cm (7.9 in) tall and 3–5 cm (1.2–2.0 in) in diameter. They are capable of dividing but not fusing. The colonies may range from 10 cm (3.9 in) in diameter to over 10 m (33 ft) across, sometimes forming extensive single-species stands.

The corallites of this species are circular and very small, measuring 2.5–3.5 mm (0.098–0.138 in) in diameter, with thick, well defined walls. The corallites may be arranged irregularly or in short valleys.

Flattened colonies of P. clavus may resemble P. bipartita, and the corallites are similar to those of P. duerdeni.

== Ecology ==
Pavona clavus is a reef-building species that grows at rates of 0.9–1.3 cm (0.35–0.51 in) per year. It is a preferred prey species of the crown-of-thorns starfish (Acanthaster planci) and one of two known host species of the gall crab Opecarcinus cathyae.

== Conservation ==
Pavona clavus is listed as least concern on the International Union for the Conservation of Nature's Red List. Though coral reefs are declining globally, P. clavus is widely distributed and expected to decline by less than 25% by 2050. In some parts of its range it is known to bleach easily, but it appears to be more resilient in other areas. It is threatened by climate change, coral diseases, dynamite fishing, human development activities (including industrial, commercial, and housing development), invasive species, pollution, sedimentation, shipping, and tourism.

The trade of this species, and all other stony corals, is regulated under Appendix II of the CITES treaty.

The world's largest individual coral colony so far found, located in the Solomon Islands off the island of Malaulalo, is a member of this species. Discovered in 2024 by a National Geographic Society expedition in collaboration with the Solomon Islands government, the Malaulalo colony measures 112 ft (34 m) wide, 105 ft (32 m) long, and 16 ft (4.9 m) tall and is estimated to be around 300 years old, composed of nearly one billion genetically identical polyps. Though the Malaulalo colony was described as being in "excellent health" by the expedition team who discovered it, other corals in the nearby reefs were observed dead. The colony's location, 42 ft (13 m) beneath the surface in cooler waters, may have contributed to its good health.
