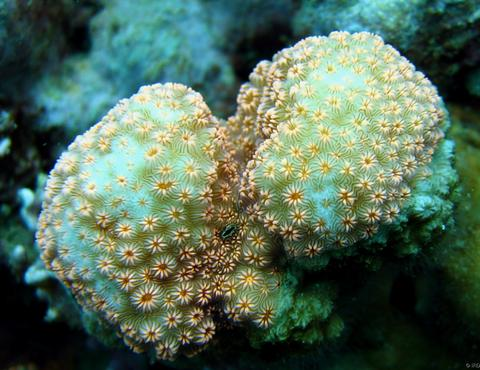

Conservation status
- Least Concern (IUCN 3.1)

Scientific classification
- Kingdom: Animalia
- Phylum: Cnidaria
- Subphylum: Anthozoa
- Class: Hexacorallia
- Order: Scleractinia
- Family: Agariciidae
- Genus: Pavona
- Species: P. maldivensis

Binomial name
- Pavona maldivensis (Gardiner, 1905)

Synonyms
- Pavona pollicata Wells, 1954; Siderastrea maldivensis Gardiner, 1905

= Pavona maldivensis =

Species of coral

Pavona maldivensis is a species of colonial stony coral in the family Agariciidae. It is found on shallow reef slopes, particularly those with strong wave action, and on vertical surfaces, in tropical parts of the Indian and Pacific Oceans.

== Description ==
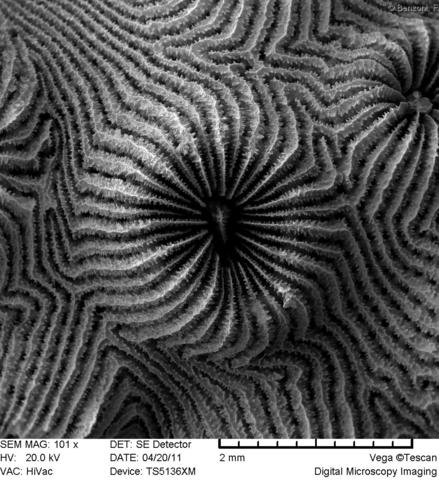
Detail of corallite

Pavona maldivensis can be encrusting or massive, or a mixture of the two, and can form clumps over a metre in diameter, although colonies smaller than 30 cm (12 in) across are more usual. In areas with strong water movement they tend to form cylindrical, finger-like growths while elsewhere they may form horizontal plates, often with "leafy" edges. The corallites (stony cups in which the polyps sit) are circular and of irregular sizes, and have individual but indistinct stony walls. This coral is usually some shade of greyish-brown or green but can be bright orange.

== Distribution and habitat ==
Though named "of the Maldives" (maldivensis), P. maldivensis has a wide distribution in tropical and subtropical waters. Its range extends from the Red Sea, Gulf of Aden and Madagascar, through the southwestern and central Indian Ocean, northern Australia, southern Japan and the South China Sea, to the western, central and eastern Pacific Ocean.

== Ecology ==
Pavona maldivensis is a zooxanthellate species of coral; this means that its tissues contain symbiotic single celled algae which provide part of its nutritional requirements. These contain chlorophyll and tend to be some shade of brown or green, but in this coral there is an additional photosynthetic pigment, phycoerythrin. In daylight, this absorbs light at one wavelength and transmits it at another, giving a bright orange fluorescence.

== In aquaria ==
Pavona maldivensis and other species in this genus are kept in reef aquariums where they are said to be easy small stony corals for beginners to care for.
