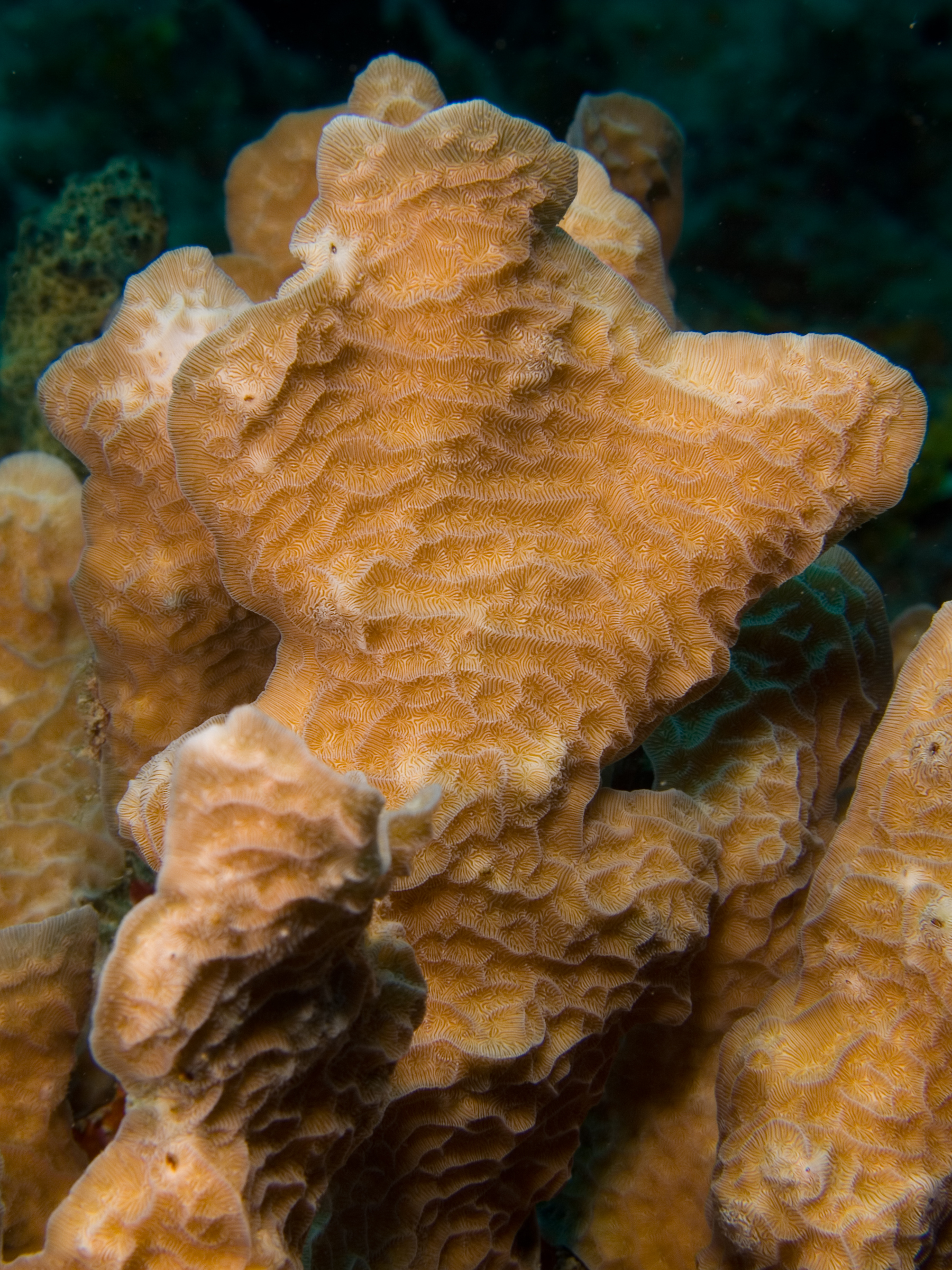

Conservation status
- Vulnerable (IUCN 3.1)

- Apparently Secure (NatureServe)

Scientific classification
- Kingdom: Animalia
- Phylum: Cnidaria
- Subphylum: Anthozoa
- Class: Hexacorallia
- Order: Scleractinia
- Family: Agariciidae
- Genus: Agaricia
- Species: A. agaricites

Binomial name
- Agaricia agaricites (Linnaeus, 1758)

= Agaricia agaricites =

Species of coral

Agaricia agaricites, commonly known as lettuce coral or tan lettuce-leaf coral, is a species of colonial stony corals in the family Agariciidae. This coral is found in shallow waters in the tropical western Atlantic Ocean and the Caribbean Sea. The IUCN has assessed its status as being vulnerable.

== Description ==
Colonies of A. agaricites have several different habits of growth, but usually occur in encrusting sheets with irregular projections or are leaf-like or plate-like. New colonies are usually encrusting, but vertical lobes and sheet-like projections begin to develop when the colonies are still quite small. The growth form seems to be partially linked to the movement of water in the vicinity and the depth. Horizontal plates normally have corallites on both sides while vertical forms have corallites on only one side. The corallites are arranged in long meandering rows, but a few are single, with sharp-pointed ridges between them. Each one has up to 36 septa and a central spongy columella. This coral is a brown or purplish-brown colour.

== Distribution and habitat ==
A. agaricites is native to the Gulf of Mexico, the Caribbean Sea, Florida and the Bahamas, and is also present on the coast of Brazil, the Fernando de Noronha islands and the Rocas Atoll. It occurs in both fore and back-reef environments, channels, lagoons and seagrass meadows, at depths down to about 75 m (246 ft).

== Ecology ==
This coral is a zooxanthellate species, which contains single-celled dinoflagellates in its tissues. These are photosynthetic and provide the coral with 70% to 95% of its energy needs. The rest of its needs are supplied by the polyps which expand at night and trap passing plankton. This is a small and relatively short-lived species but new young colonies are frequently to be found. This coral recruits readily to open patches of reef in the western Atlantic but could be considered a "coral weed" as it contributes little to reef development. In the United States Virgin Islands, where a plume of sediment had killed a section of fore-reef, within a few years A. agaricites had proliferated and provided almost complete cover.

A. agaricites is susceptible to bleaching. In 1997, during an El Niño Southern Oscillation year with raised seawater temperatures off the coast of Brazil, this coral was the most affected coral species, with 80% of the individual colonies being bleached. When the water temperature returned to more normal levels, the colonies were slow to recover, but six months later, neither bleached nor dead colonies were found.

== Status ==
A. agaricites is a common coral and in some areas is the dominant species of coral. The International Union for Conservation of Nature has assessed its conservation status as being vulnerable.
