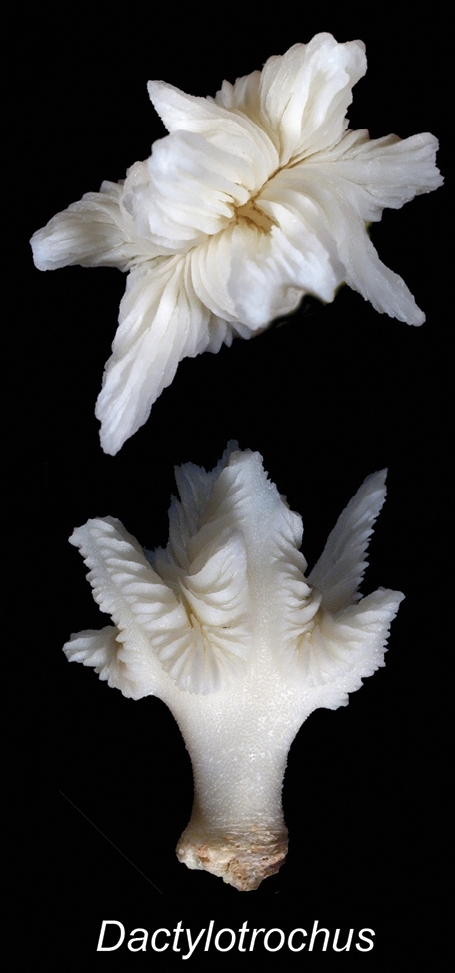

Scientific classification
- Kingdom: Animalia
- Phylum: Cnidaria
- Subphylum: Anthozoa
- Class: Hexacorallia
- Order: Scleractinia
- Family: Agariciidae
- Genus: Dactylotrochus; Wells, 1954
- Species: D. cervicornis

Binomial name
- Dactylotrochus cervicornis (Moseley, 1881)

Synonyms
- Tridacophyllia cervicornis Moseley, 1881; Tridacophyllia primordialis Gardiner, 1899

= Dactylotrochus =

Dactylotrochus cervicornis

Genus of corals

Dactylotrochus is a genus of large polyp stony corals from the Red Sea and western Pacific Ocean. It is monotypic with a single species, Dactylotrochus cervicornis. It inhabits the deep sea and is believed to be azooxanthellate.

== Description ==
Dactylotrochus cervicornis is a sturdy solitary coral with a short pedicel measuring 15 millimeters (0.6 in) in diameter and an encrusting base. The maximum size is 28 by 19 millimetres (1.10 by 0.75 in) in diameter and 37 millimetres (1.5 in) high. The fossa (central depression) is elongated and the calyx is deep. As the coral grows, certain parts of the corallite wall and septa develop more than others and two or more petal-like lobes grow, often recurving. The septa are very numerous; they are narrow except near the corallite wall and there is no central columella.

== Taxonomy ==
This species was originally classified in the family Caryophylliidae but phylogenetic studies show that it should be included in Agariciidae, even though other members of this family are shallow water, colonial corals. The ancestor of the family was probably solitary and azooxanthellate, and such solitary fossil species as Trochoseris can now be better accommodated in this family.

== Distribution and habitat ==
D. cervicornis is known from the Red Sea and from various oceanic islands in the Indo-Pacific region; it occurs in Guam, Hawaii, Palau, Vanuatu and Wallis and Futuna, and also from the eastward slope of Bikini Atoll and the Baie de Sandal in New Caledonia. Its depth range is 73 to 852 metres (240 to 2,800 ft). It is not considered to be a hermatypic (reef building) coral.

== Biology ==
The polyp secretes the calcium carbonate from which the skeleton is built. It spreads its tentacles to catch the plankton on which it feeds and can also absorb dissolved organic matter from the water. Although this is assumed to be a solitary coral, new polyps can bud from the base.
