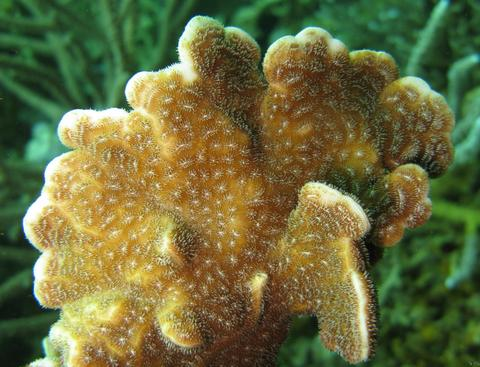
- Pavona decussata in New Caledonia

Conservation status
- Least Concern (IUCN 3.1)

Scientific classification
- Kingdom: Animalia
- Phylum: Cnidaria
- Subphylum: Anthozoa
- Class: Hexacorallia
- Order: Scleractinia
- Family: Agariciidae
- Genus: Pavona
- Species: P. decussata

Binomial name
- Pavona decussata (Dana, 1846)

Synonyms
- List: Pavona crassa Dana, 1846; Pavona lata Dana, 1846; Pavona seriata Brüggemann, 1879; Pavonia decussata Dana, 1846; Pavonia seriata Brüggemann, 1879 [lapsus]

= Pavona decussata =

Species of coral

Pavona decussata, sometimes known as leaf coral, is a species of colonial stony coral in the family Agariciidae. It is found in shallow water in various reef habitats, particularly on gently sloping surfaces, in tropical parts of the western and central Indo-Pacific region.

== Description ==
Colonies of Pavona decussata are submassive structures, usually with leafy appendages or branches. These leaves are between 3 and 10 millimetres (0.1 and 0.4 in) thick and have corallites on both sides. The corallites are between 2 and 3 millimetres (0.08 and 0.12 in) in diameter and are mostly scattered irregularly, but are sometimes in rows parallel to the margins of the leaves or of the radial ridges. The colour varies, but may be greenish or some shade of brown, orange or creamy yellow.

== Distribution and habitat ==
Pavona decussata is native to the western and central Indo-Pacific region. Its range extends from East Africa and the Red Sea to Japan, the East China Sea, the Philippines, Papua New Guinea and eastern Australia. It is a fairly common species and occurs in various reef habitats especially on sloping surfaces, at depths down to about 15 metres (50 ft).

== Status ==
Pavona decussata is a common species with a widespread distribution. The population trend is unknown, however this coral is susceptible to bleaching, and it is probable that the number of mature colonies is decreasing as a result of destruction of its reef habitats. Its conservation status has been assessed as being "vulnerable" by the International Union for Conservation of Nature.
