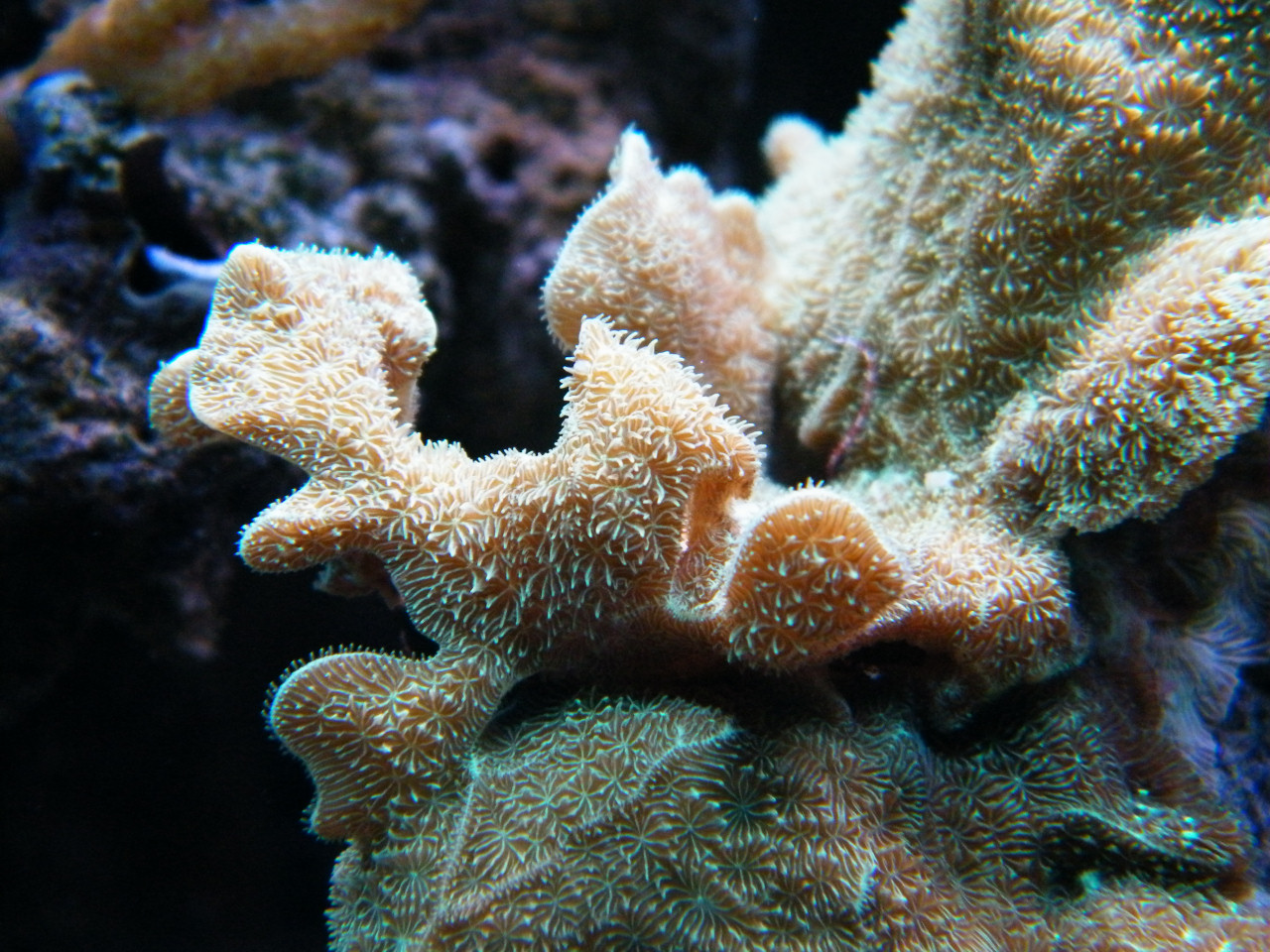
- Cactus coral

Conservation status
- Vulnerable (IUCN 3.1)

Scientific classification
- Kingdom: Animalia
- Phylum: Cnidaria
- Subphylum: Anthozoa
- Class: Hexacorallia
- Order: Scleractinia
- Family: Agariciidae
- Genus: Pavona
- Species: P. cactus

Binomial name
- Pavona cactus Forsskål, 1775

Synonyms
- List: Lophoseris knorri Milne Edwards & Haime, 1851; Madrepora cactus Forsskål, 1775; Madrepora cristata Ellis & Solander, 1786; Pavona cristata Ellis & Solander; Pavona formosa Dana, 1846; Pavona praetorta (Dana); Pavona venusta Dana, 1846

= Pavona cactus =

Species of coral

Pavona cactus, the cactus coral, potato chip coral or leaf coral is a species of colonial stony coral in the family Agariciidae. This coral is found in shallow waters on reefs and in lagoons in tropical parts of the Indo-Pacific region.

== Description ==
Colonies of this species have vertical, irregular, two-sided fronds about 5 cm (2 in) tall and not more than 5 mm (0.2 in) thick. The corallites housing the polyps are very shallow and form widely separated rows parallel to the margins of the fronds. The bases of these fronds may be dead while the upper parts are still alive supported by the skeletal tissue below. The fronds may be clustered together in a supercolony formed from one or more individual colonies and extending for several metres (yards) across the seabed. This is a zooxanthellate species of coral, with symbiotic microscopic algae living in its tissues. It is an olive green or a brownish colour.

== Distribution ==
Pavona cactus is found in the tropical Indo-Pacific, its range extending from the Red Sea and East African coast to Japan, Tahiti and Australia. It is found in turbid but calm waters, on upper reef slopes and in shallow lagoons at depths down to 40 metres (130 ft).

== Biology ==
The polyps of Pavona cactus extend their tentacles at night to catch plankton. They also benefit and obtain nourishment from the intracellular zooxanthellae. These use energy from the sun to turn simple substances into complex carbohydrates and the coral makes use of the surplus nutrients. The algae benefit from being in a protected, well-lit environment well clear of the seabed and by receiving nitrogenous waste from the coral.

Pavona cactus can reproduce sexually or asexually. In sexual reproduction, gametes are released into the sea where fertilisation takes place. The egg hatches into a free-swimming planula larva that settles on the seabed when it has completed its development. Here it undergoes metamorphosis to become a coral polyp which buds repeatedly to start a new colony. Another method by which colonies may increase in number is by fragmentation. If a bit of coral that has broken off a parent colony becomes wedged in a suitable position, it can continue to grow and reproduce by budding to form a new colony.

== Status ==
Although this coral is common and has a wide range, the International Union for Conservation of Nature lists this species in its Red List of Threatened Species as being "Vulnerable". Under adverse conditions, such as a rise in sea temperature, this coral may expel its zooxanthellae and become bleached. It is then much more susceptible to disease. Coral reefs in general are under threat from a decline in the quality of the habitat through mechanical damage, pollution, sedimentation, ocean acidification and global warming and Pavona cactus faces another threat in that it is collected for the aquarium trade.
