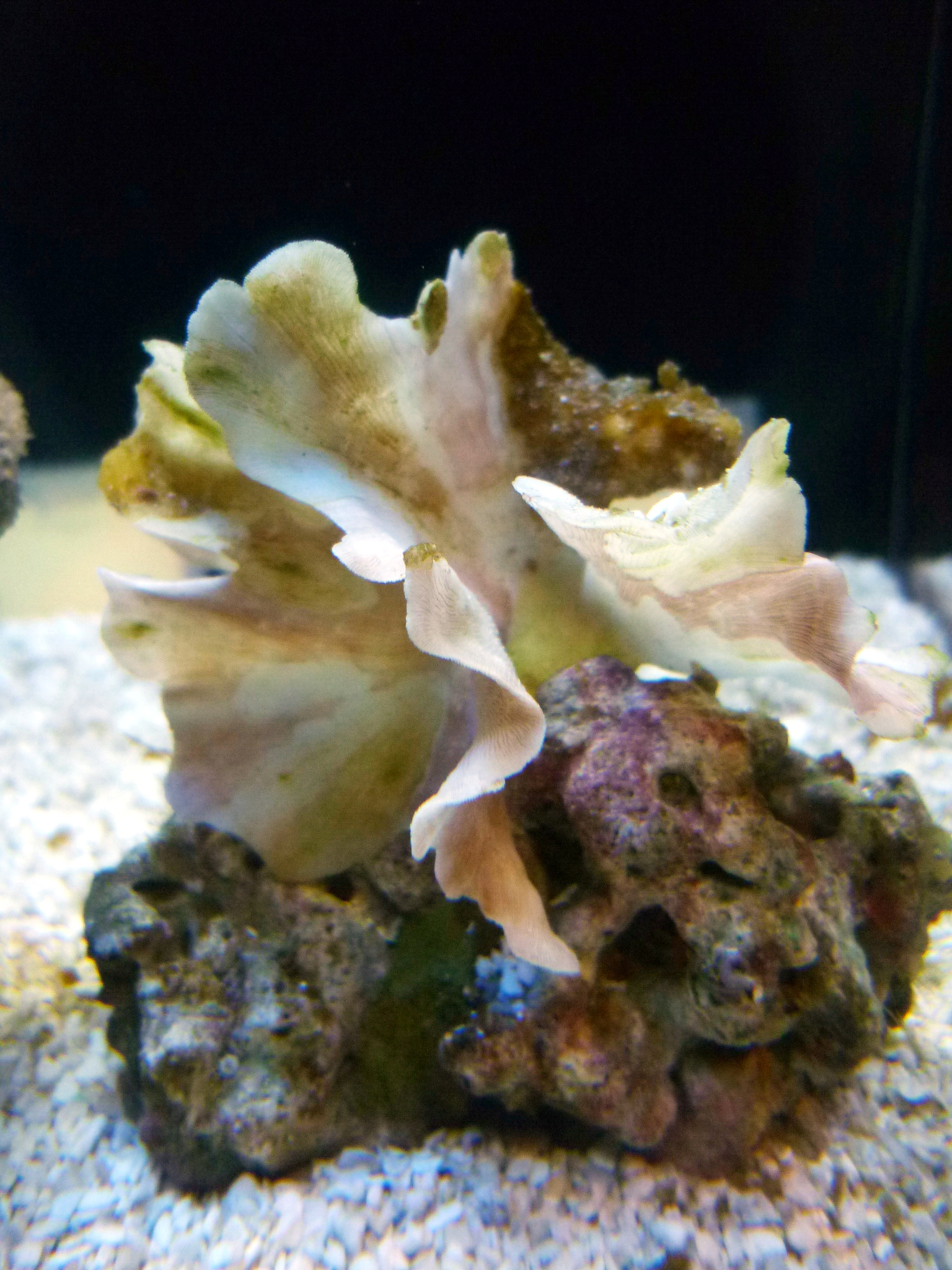
- Potato chip coral (Pavona cactus)

Scientific classification
- Kingdom: Animalia
- Phylum: Cnidaria
- Subphylum: Anthozoa
- Class: Hexacorallia
- Order: Scleractinia
- Family: Agariciidae
- Genus: Pavona; Lamarck, 1801

Species
- See text

Synonyms
- List: Lophoseris Milne Edwards & Haime, 1849; Pavonia Lamarck, 1801 [lapsus]; Polyastra Ehrenberg, 1834; Pseudocolumnastrea Yabe & Sugiyama, 1933; Tichoseris Quelch, 1884

= Pavona (coral) =

Genus of corals

Pavona is a genus of colonial stony corals in the family Agariciidae. These corals are found in shallow waters in the Indo-Pacific region.

== Characteristics ==
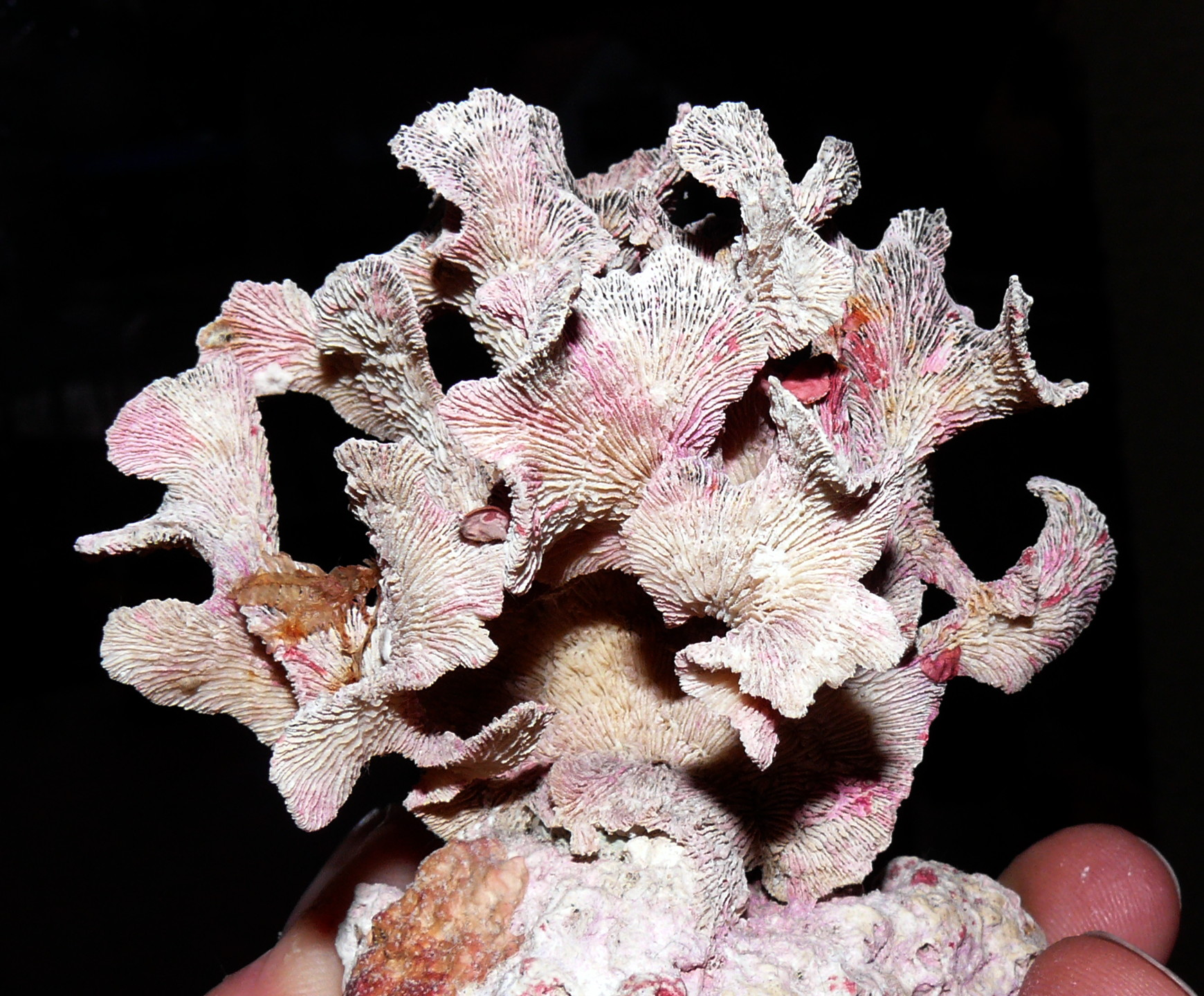
Pavona decussata skeleton

Corals in this genus have a range of different forms including those that are massive, meandering, columnar, leaf-like, and plate-like. A single species may vary in form according to the current, wave action, lighting conditions, and depth of its location. Members of the genus are distinguished from other corals by having no walls to the corallites, but having clearly delineated septocostae that connect each corallite to its neighbours, giving a flower-like pattern on the surface of the coral. The corallites themselves are shallow depressions with central columella and may be separated by ridges. The polyps, with the exception of Pavona explanulata, are only extended at night. The foliose and plate-like forms tend to be two-sided. If they do not get enough nutrients or “food” from photosynthesis they switch to the autotrophic mode, and obtain some of their nutrition from their symbiotic algae. They can also absorb nutrients from uptaking dissolved organics from the water and even using carbon dioxide to turn it in organic carbon sources they can feed on.

== Species ==
The World Register of Marine Species recognises these species:

- Pavona bipartita Nemenzo, 1980
- Pavona cactus (Forskål, 1775)
- Pavona chiriquiensis Glynn, Mate & Stemann, 2001
- Pavona clavus (Dana, 1846)
- Pavona danai Milne Edwards, 1860
- Pavona decussata (Dana, 1846)
- Pavona diffluens (Lamarck, 1816)
- Pavona dilatata Nemenzo & Montecillo, 1985
- Pavona diminuta Veron, 1990
- Pavona divaricata Lamarck, 1816
- Pavona duerdeni Scheer & Pillai, 1974
- Pavona explanulata (Lamarck, 1816)
- Pavona frondifera (Lamarck, 1816)
- Pavona gigantea Verrill, 1869
- Pavona maldivensis (Gardiner, 1905)
- Pavona minor Brüggemann
- Pavona minuta Wells, 1954
- Pavona varians Verrill, 1864
- Pavona venosa (Ehrenberg, 1834)
- Pavona xarifae Scheer & Pillai, 1974
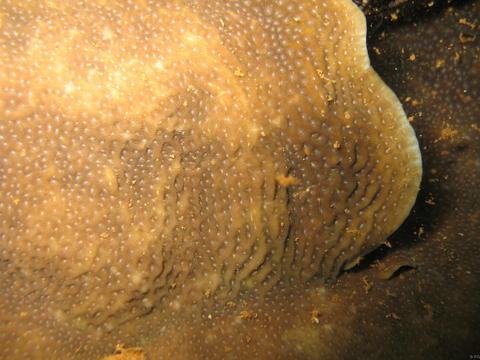
Pavona bipartita

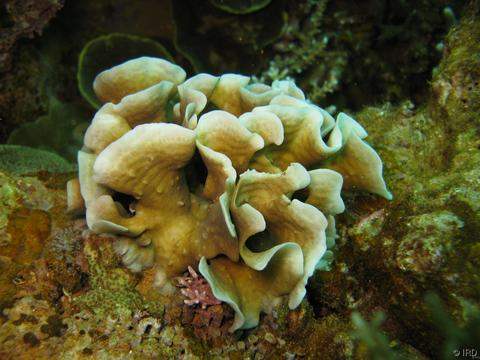
Pavona cactus

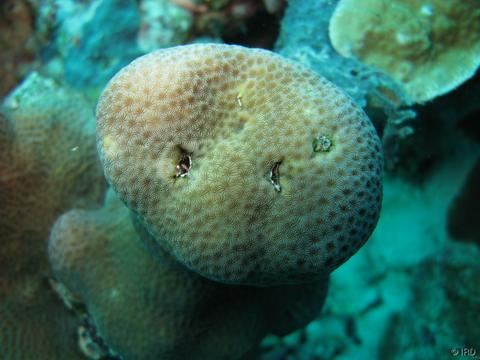
Pavona clavus

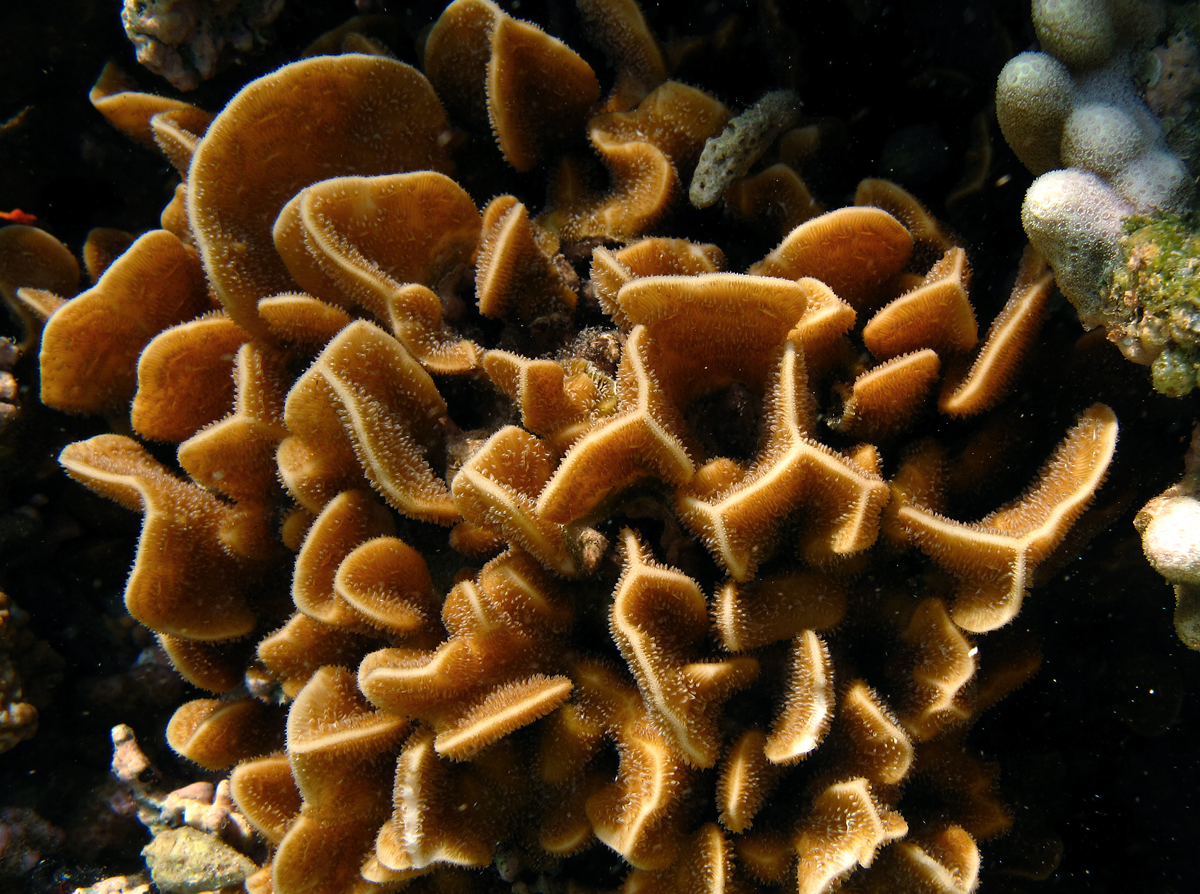
Pavona decussata

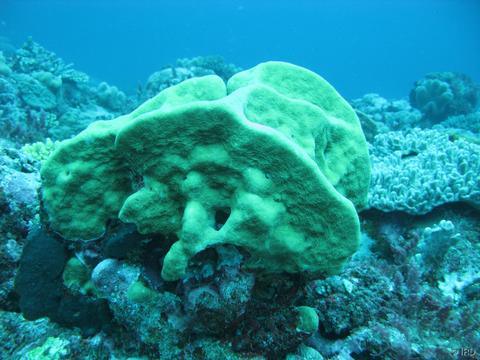
Pavona duerdeni

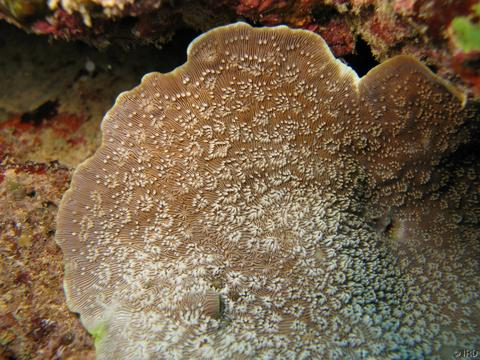
Pavona explanulata

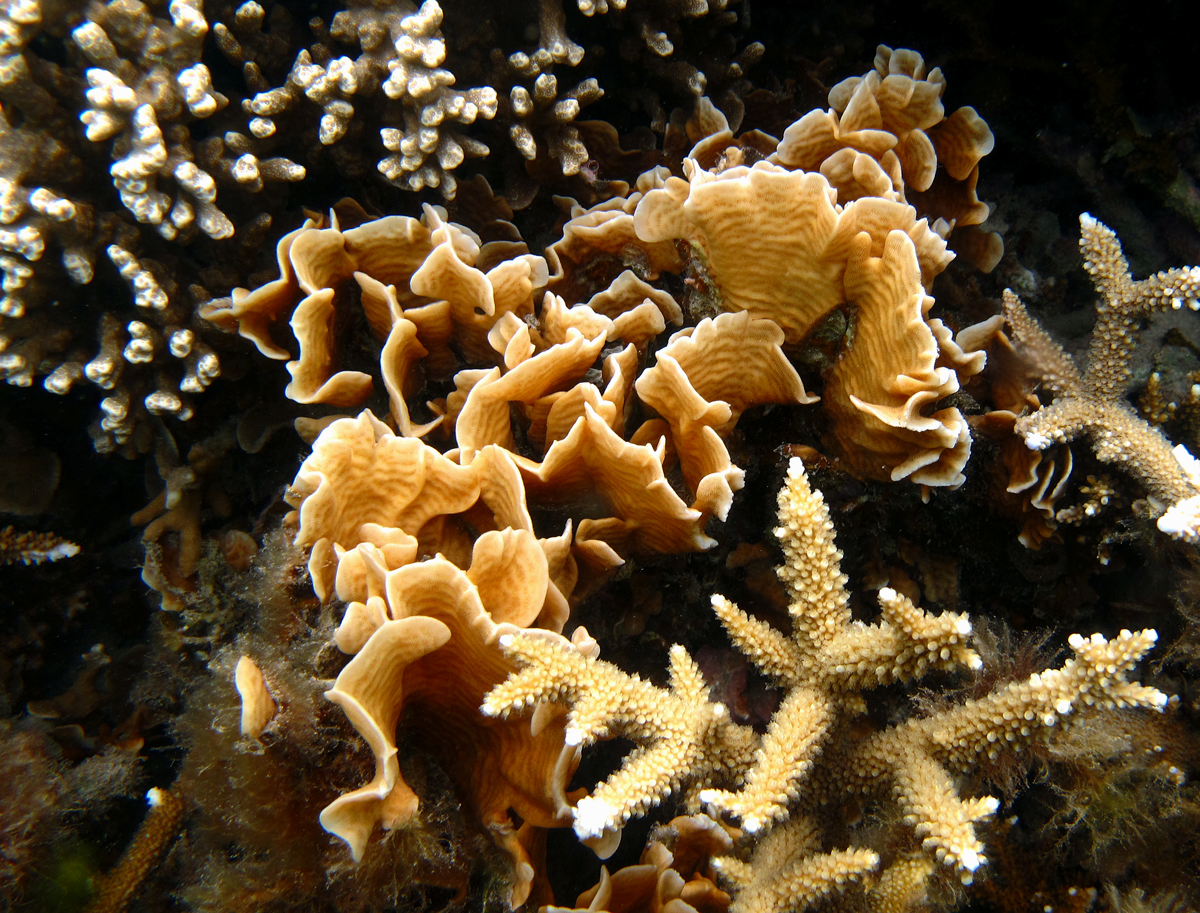
Pavona frondifera

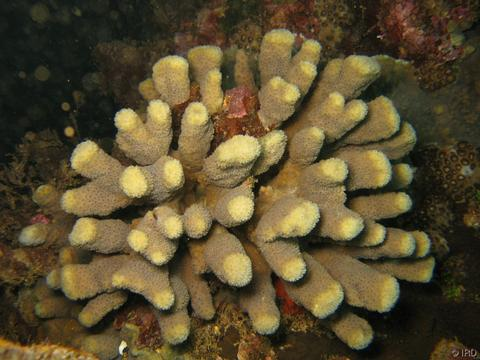
Pavona maldivensis

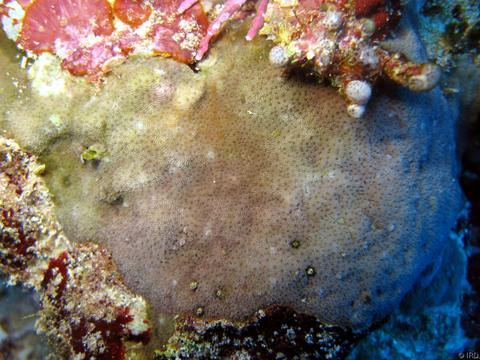
Pavona minuta

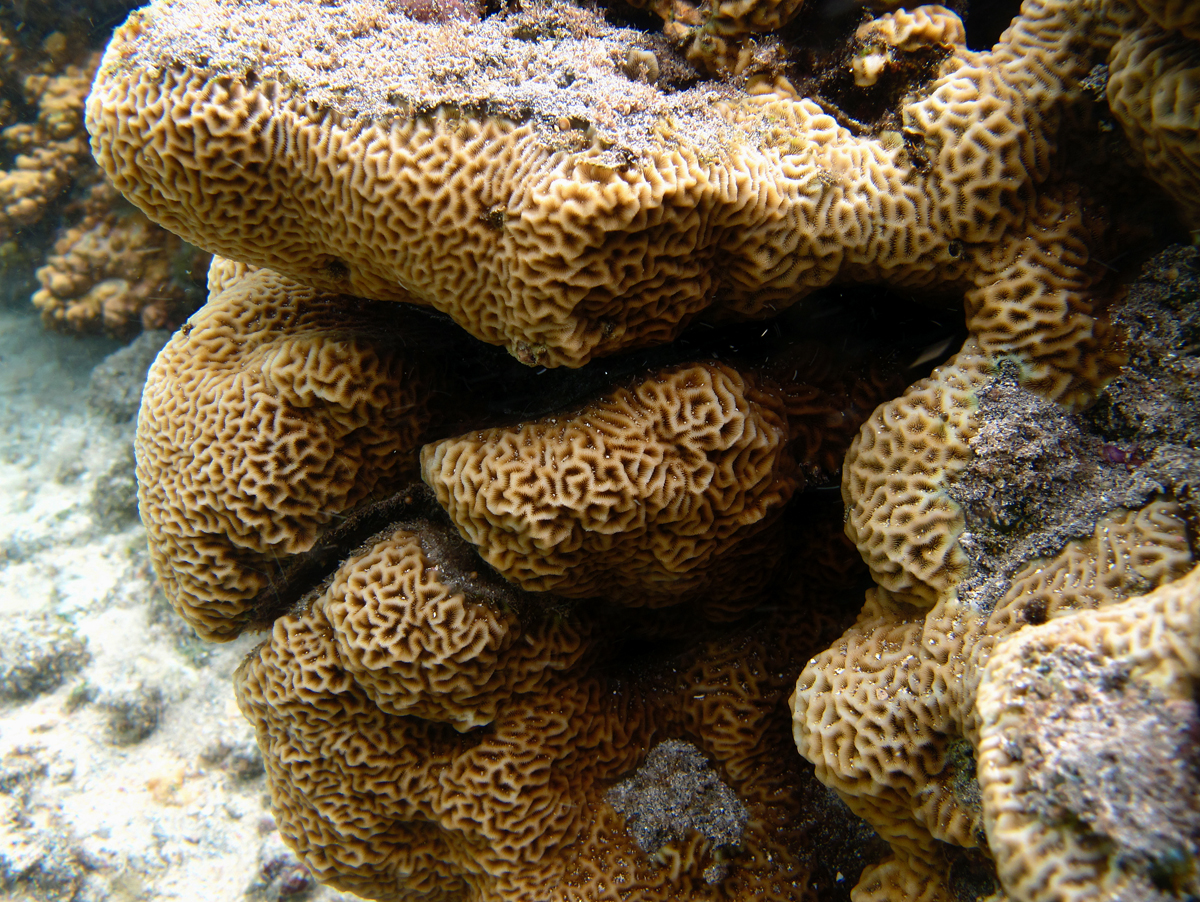
Pavona varians

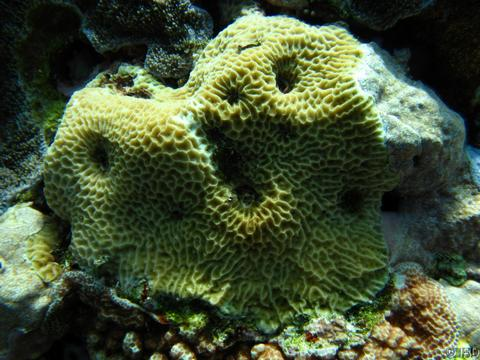
Pavona venosa
