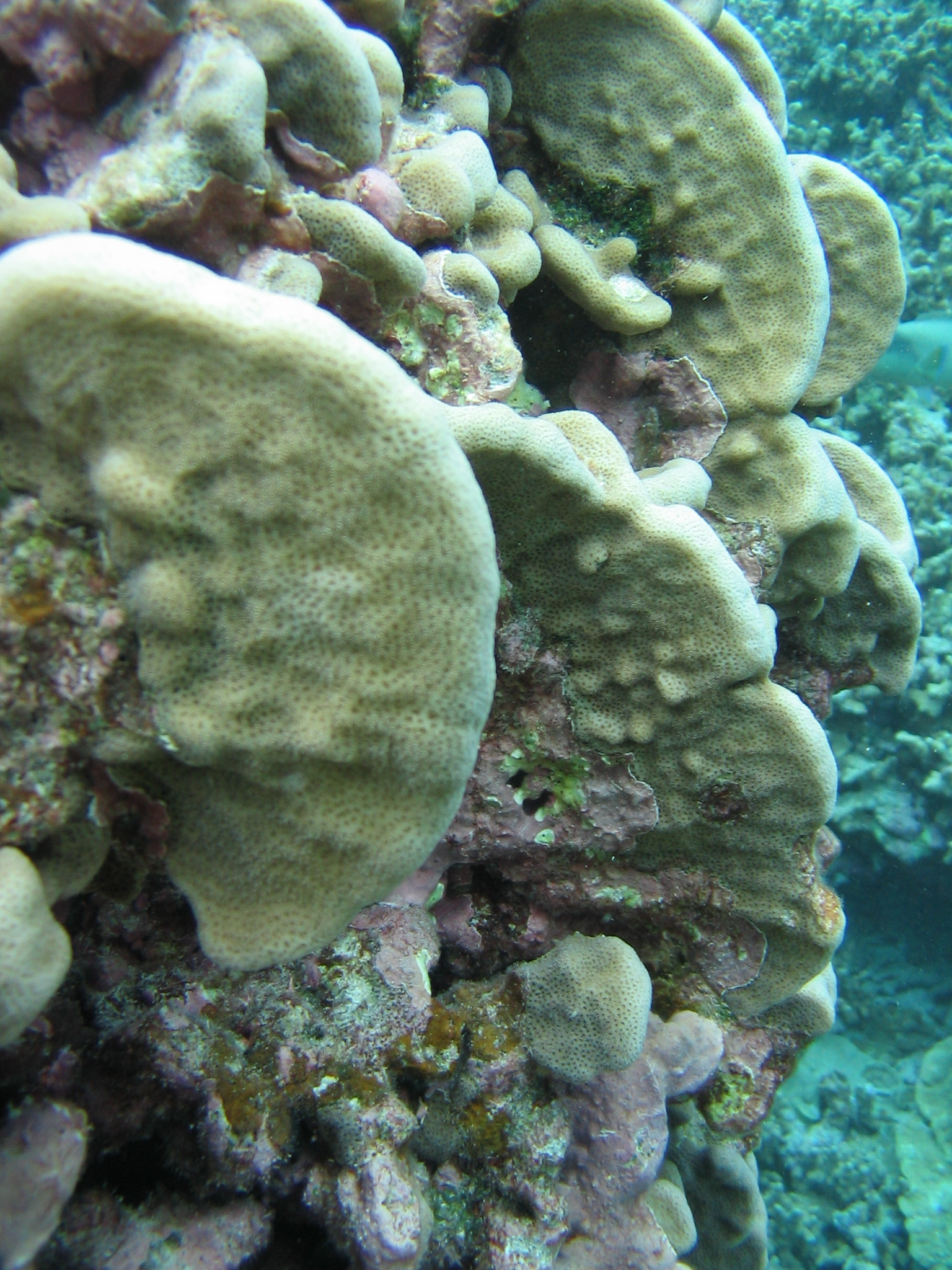

Conservation status
- Endangered (IUCN 3.1)

Scientific classification
- Kingdom: Animalia
- Phylum: Cnidaria
- Subphylum: Anthozoa
- Class: Hexacorallia
- Order: Scleractinia
- Family: Agariciidae
- Genus: Pavona
- Species: P. duerdeni

Binomial name
- Pavona duerdeni Sheppard, C.R.C., 1987

= Pavona duerdeni =

Species of coral

Pavona duerdeni, the porkchop coral, is a coral that forms clusters of cream-colored lobes or discs. They grow in large colonies, divided into ridges or hillocks. The coral is considered to be uncommon due to its low confirmed abundance, yet they are more commonly found in Hawaii, the Indo-Pacific, and the Tropical Eastern Pacific. They make up some of the largest colonies of corals, and have a slow growth rate, as indicated by their dense skeletons. Their smooth appearance is due to their small corallites growing on their surface.

== Characteristics ==
=== Appearance ===
Pavona duerdeni is usually a uniform grey color, having yellow and brown coloration on the surface of the coral. The coral receives its coloration from the aggregation of the yellow-brown symbiotic zooxanthellae on its hard, lobe-shaped structure. The dimensions of the typical Pavona duerdeni were recorded to be above 1.5m in height and 3m in diameter. Pavona duerdeni are Hermatypic corals, as part of the order Scleractinia, they sediment hard, calcareous material to form the skeleton of the coral upon which the reef is built. Small corallites made out of calcium carbonate skeletons, serving as polyp's protection against predation, are found on the surface of Pavona duerdeni, giving the stony coral an overall smooth appearance. The coral's polyps are only expanded during the day, except when encountered with rapid currents, or water flow, in which case the polyps retreat inside of their corallites.

Pavona duerdeni colonies are considered to be massive corals; with the larger structure divided into small hillocks with irregular ridges. Massive corals are typically boulder-shaped and grow at a slower rate in comparison to corals of reduced size. Due to their stable structures and profiles, massive corals are rarely impacted or disabled by strong wave action, unless the force of impact causes a dislodge from their holdfasts.

=== Identification of species ===
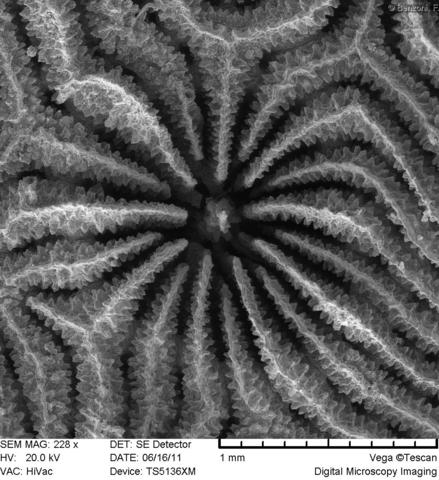
The corallites have strongly alternating septo-costae, giving the coral a flower-like pattern seen on the surface of their structure.

The species Pavona duerdeni belong the Anthozoans, characterized by being marine invertebrates. In the case of Pavona duerdeni, when developed, they are attached to the seabed, while their larvae are dispersed as part of the plankton. Being part of the order Scleractinia, Pavona duerdeni are stony or hard corals, and colonial where the founding polyp settles and starts to secrete calcium carbonate to protect its body. As part of the family Agariciidae, Pavona duerdeni is a reef-building stony coral, with mutualistic symbiotic zooxanthellae, helping achieve nutritional requirements in their tissue. As a members of the genus Pavona, they possess a flower-like pattern seen on the surface of their structure. This occurs due to the corallites on the coral lacking walls between them, while having the corallite connected to their neighbors through septo-costae with clear delineations.

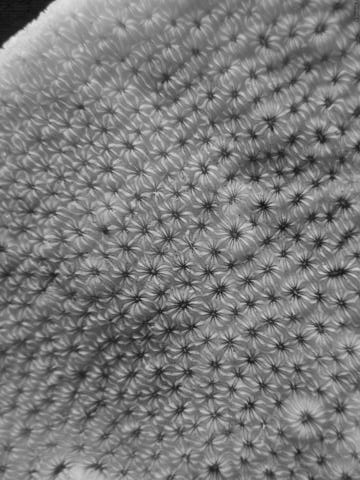
Shown are Pavona duerdeni's polyps.

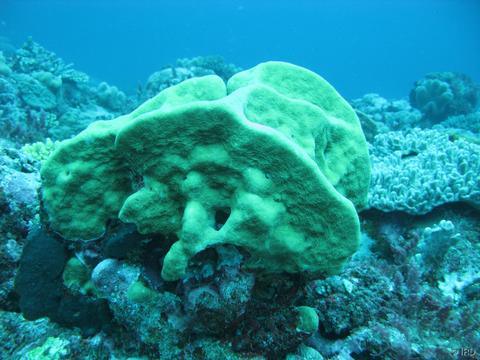
Pavona duerdeni colonies are considered to be massive corals, typically boulder-shaped; with the larger structure divided into small hillocks with irregular ridges.

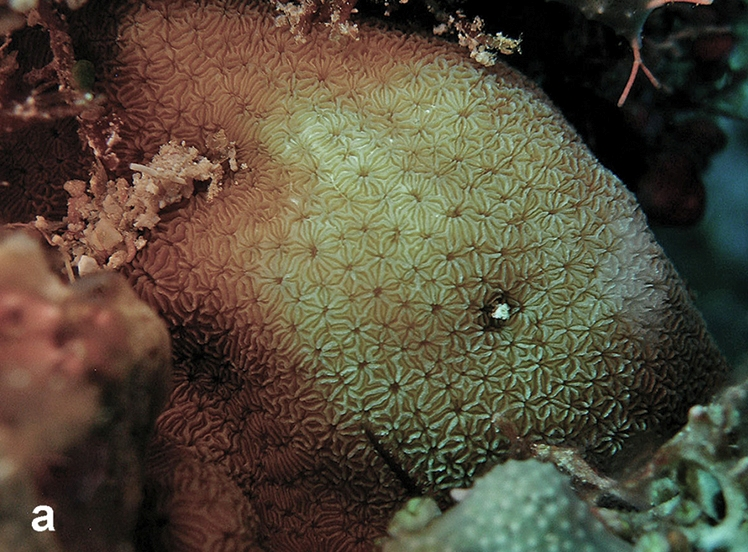
Pigmentation of the surface of the coral is attributed to the presence and aggregation of the mutualistic symbiotic zooxanthellae dinoflagellate.

Fossil record obtained from the Hawaiian archipelago, date Pavona duerdeni as Pleistocene corals, belonging to the first epoch of the Quaternary period, between the Pliocene and Holocene epochs. The first taxonomic reference on record for this species was made in 1980, where the species was considered to be Pavona minuta, referenced as such by other marine scientists until after a closer investigation into the species in 2000 by the Australian Institute of Marine Science, led it to be identified as Pavona duerdeni instead. Pavona duerdeni has similar corallites like those seen on Pavona clavus, yet they are smaller in size and with more exert primary septo-costae. They have also been compared to, and often confused with Pavona minuta, where corallites are similar to those of Pavona duerdeni, but they are smaller, with less septo-costae and the color ranging from dark green to brown.

== Distribution and habitat ==
=== Geographic distribution ===
The coral is considered to be uncommon due to its low confirmed abundance, yet has been found in Hawaii, the Indo-Pacific, and the Tropical Eastern Pacific. Large aggregations of Pavona duerdeni have been confirmed in: the Gulf of Panama; the Carrizales, Colima coral reef, located the Western Mexican coast; in Thailand in Koh Tao reef; in the Johnston Atoll reef; in the Hawaiian Archipelago and the Emperor seamount chain.

=== Habitat ===
The habitat for Pavona duerdeni consists of shallow reef environments, forming large colonies on horizontal shallow substrates. Their distribution on the ocean floor has been identified to start at the depth of five meters and below, becoming more abundant at between nine and ten meters of depth, along with the sedimentation of similar massive corals. Pavona duerdeni are identified as reef-building corals, geographically restricted to shallow marine environments. These corals live free or attached to the reef frameworks or rocky substrates, in rubble zones, as well as soft bottom areas. Ideal temperatures for the coral to thrive have been recorded in the ranges between 25 °C and 29 °C, with an observed threshold of minimum average temperature of 18 °C.

Pavona duerdeni provides the structure necessary for the establishment of coral holobiont, where the coral polyps, and microorganisms including bacteria, archaea, fungi, viruses, and protists, form an ecological unit allowing nitrogen fixation and decomposition of organic materials to occur within the system.

== Ecology ==
=== Mutualism ===
Coral polyps, animals, and zooxanthellae, being single-celled organisms, have a mutualistic relationship, where each organism benefit from each other. Through this relationship, Pavona duerdeni get their photosynthetically fixed carbon needed to achieve their needed respiratory requirements. The algal symbiosis with the dinoflagellates leads to photosynthetic production by these symbioses, largely responsible for the life and growth of tropical reef communities. When corals are presented with diverse stress-inducing situations, polyps expel the algal cells and they take on a white appearance, causing "coral bleaching". When the coral reaches the "bleached" stage, they have lost all their zooxanthellae cells.

=== Reproduction ===
As part of the Anthozoa class, Pavona duerdeni, releases spawning-eggs and sperm into the water columns simultaneously. After fertilization, it develops into a planula larvae, with a solid, flattened body using cilia to prevail as free-swimming larvae, further transported by the aid of surface currents. Once the larvae are fully developed, they will settle on the seabed and attach to the substrate, eventually growing into coral polyps. The corals, being hermatypic, will build reefs by depositing hard, calcareous material to form large structures. With time the coral will reach the status of massive coral, creating boulder-sized formations, for the support of life around and within them.

=== Threats ===
White Plague Disease, is a virus first observed in the 1970’s killing coral tissue, thus responsible for major reef declines worldwide. Corals affected by the plague experience a rapid loss of tissue, leaving with an identifiable line of white in the middle. The white line typically found in the middle of the coral divides the colored, algal-colonized, living sections. Pavona duerdeni have experienced grave loss due to the plague off the coast of Thailand, along with other Pavona species.

Contributing to habit loss for reef-associated organisms Pavona duerdeni is affected by diverse challenges reefs face today. Seawater temperature changing as a result of climate change cause stress on the coral. When temperatures are too high, the relationship between corals and their symbiotic microalgae breaks down. This leads to "coral bleaching", where when the increase in water temperature is significant, then the corals expel the zooxanthellae living in their tissues, causing then the coral to turn completely white, thus "bleaching". Ocean acidification also has adverse effects on the ocean, for when seawater absorbs some of the excess CO_{2} from the atmosphere, then this causes the ocean to become more acidic. These acidic conditions dissolve coral skeletons, which make up the structure of the reef, and make it more difficult for corals to grow and reproduce, threatening their existence.
