= Madrepora cristata =

Madrepora cristata is an unaccepted scientific name and may refer to two species of corals:

- Lobophyllia hemprichii as described by Esper, 1789
- Pavona cactus as described by Ellis & Solander
