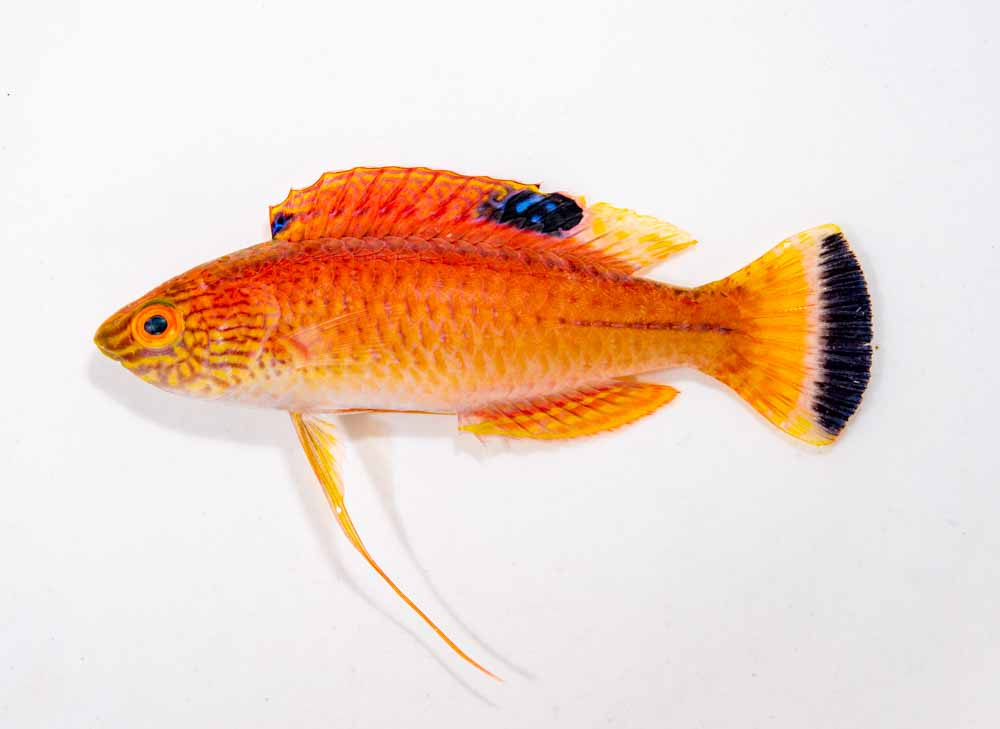

Scientific classification
- Domain: Eukaryota
- Kingdom: Animalia
- Phylum: Chordata
- Class: Actinopterygii
- Order: Labriformes
- Family: Labridae
- Genus: Cirrhilabrus
- Species: C. briangreenei

Binomial name
- Cirrhilabrus briangreenei Tea, Pyle and Rocha, 2020

= Cirrhilabrus briangreenei =

Species of fish

Cirrhilabrus briangreenei, the Latigo fairy wrasse, is a species of wrasse that lives at mesophotic reef and rubble patches at depths of 40–110 m (130–360 ft) in the Philippines (reports from elsewhere are likely due to confusion with the similar C. pylei). It was known for several years in the marine aquarium trade before its scientific species description in 2020. Based on a small number of measured specimens, it is up to about 6.5 cm (2.6 in) in standard length. In an aquarium setting, it will feed on amphipods, brine shrimps, copepods, Cyclops, Daphnia, fish larvae, invertebrates, lobster eggs and zooplankton.

== Etymology ==
Cirrhilabrus briangreenei is named in honor of Brian D. Greene, who in addition to collecting the type specimen, has contributed extensively towards the study and exploration of coral reef diversity through deep technical diving. To be treated as a noun in apposition. The common name "latigo" is Tagalog for "whip", given in reference to the long, slender pelvic fins.
