= Mesophotic coral reef =

Marine ecosystem

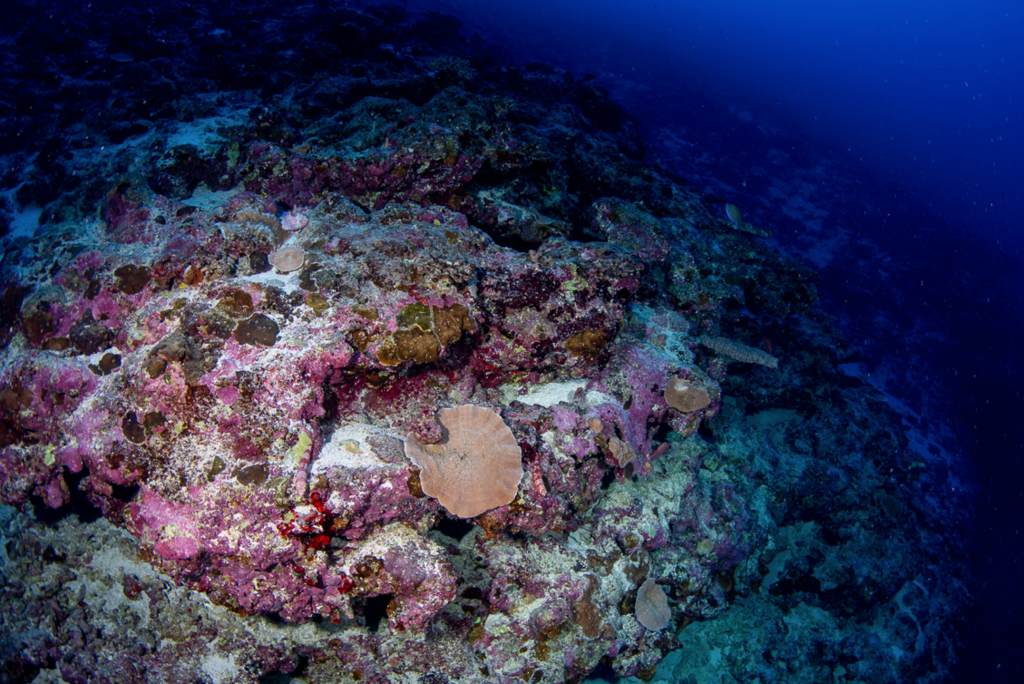
Mesophotic coral ecosystem in the Marshall Islands. Photo by Luiz A. Rocha.

A mesophotic coral reef or mesophotic coral ecosystem (MCE), originally from the Latin word meso (meaning middle) and photic (meaning light), is characterized by the presence of both light-dependent coral and algae, and organisms that can be found in water with low light penetration. Mesophotic coral ecosystems occur at depths beyond those typically associated with coral reefs as the mesophotic ranges from brightly lit to some areas where light does not reach. Mesophotic coral ecosystem (MCEs) is a new, widely adopted term used to refer to mesophotic coral reefs, as opposed to other similar terms like "deep coral reef communities" and "twilight zone", since those terms sometimes are confused due to their unclear, interchangeable nature. Many species of fish and corals are endemic to the MCEs making these ecosystems a crucial component in maintaining global diversity. Recently, there has been increased focus on the MCEs as these reefs are a crucial part of the coral reef systems serving as a potential refuge area for shallow coral reef taxa such as coral and sponges. Advances in recent technologies such as remotely operated underwater vehicles (ROVs) and autonomous underwater vehicles (AUVs) have enabled humans to conduct further research on these ecosystems and monitor these marine environments.

Mesophotic coral reefs also serve as a transition zone between shallow and deep-sea environments which creates a specialized and unique biodiversity for the MCEs. They normally occur between 30 and 40 meters (130 ft) up to 150 meters (490 ft) in tropical and subtropical water. Mesophotic community zonation seems to firstly be driven by light and temperature, which broadly corresponds to the upper mesophotic at 30 m to 60 m in depth and the lower mesophotic at 60 m to 150 m. In some areas such as the American Samoa mesophotic reefs contain 80% of corals while the rest inhabits the shallow reefs (30 m to 0 m). They are distributed globally but remain mostly understudied. Basic information on the taxonomic composition, depth range, habitat preferences, and abundance and distribution of the mesophotic coral ecosystem is limited.

== Species ==
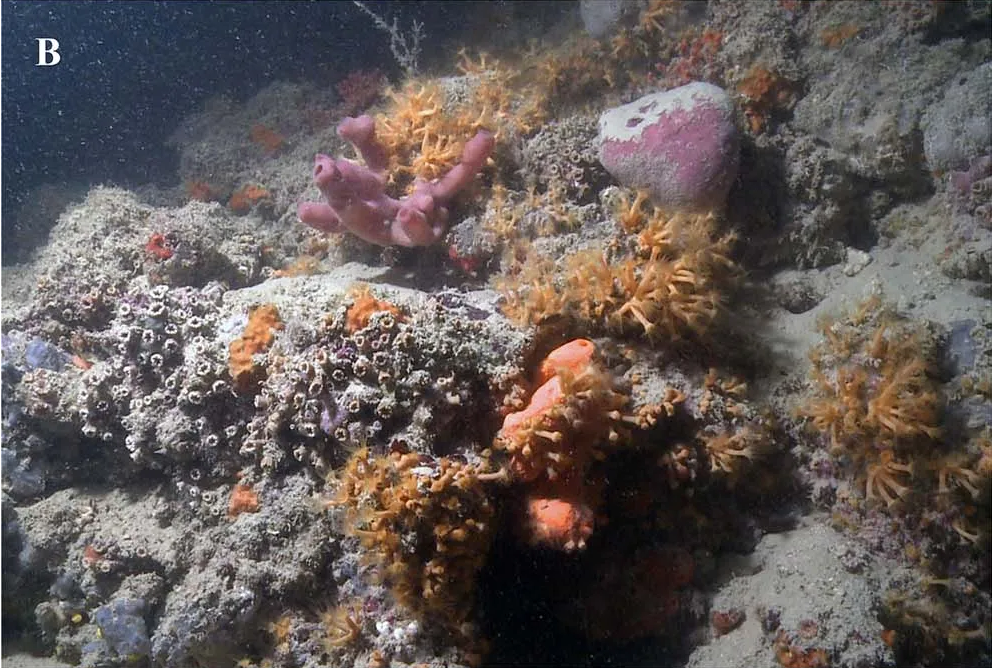
Image of a mesophotic coral reef containing diverse species of corals.

The most common species at the mesophotic level are corals, sponges and algae. The corals ranges can overlap with deep-water coral but are distinguished by the presence of zooxanthellae and their requirement for light. The species found in the mesophotic coral reefs were previously believed to be an extension of the shallow water coral ecosystem and a crossover of coral species between the two is common. MCE studies reveal that there are various habitats and communities of corals, sponges and fishes, which are significantly different from their shallow-water counterparts. In the red sea, two species of Alveopora are exclusively found in the mesophotic region. Other unique species that were only found in mesophotic coral reefs are Symbiodinium, Brachyuran crabs, Porites astreoides, Acropora tenella.

Other species are found in both shallow reefs and mesophotic reefs, however some are more numerous in the MCEs and some have increased fecundity. Many coral taxa appear to be endemic to mesophotic regions as they are outcompeted in shallow water reefs by faster photosynthetic taxa. Species such as (sharks, groupers, and snappers) move across the mesophotic and shallow zones daily. Their original habitats are in the mesophotic zone however their food is hunted and captured in shallow zones. The mesophotic coral reef serves as an area for many species of corals that are more sensitive to high sea water temperatures lowering their chances to suffer from coral bleaching. The oldest known mesophotic coral ecosystems have been described from the Silurian of Sweden, such ecosystems are also known from Devonian. Oldest scleractinian-dominated mesophotic ecosystems are known from the Triassic.

Due to recent anthropogenic impacts, it was thought that the MCEs are less affected by human development and climate change, and could be used as a source for reseeding shallow water coral species. However, recent analyses show that mesophotic ecosystems face significant impacts from climate change.

== Reef builders ==
Corals are the main components of any coral reefs including ones found in the mesophotic region. Other organisms also contribute to the biodiversity found in these reefs such as macroalgae and sponges.

=== Macroalgae ===
Macroalgae, more commonly referred to as seaweed, are species of macroscopic, multicellular, marine algae. They include Rhodophyta (red), Phaeophyta (brown) and Chlorophyta (green) macroalgae. Many of these species also play the role of capturing carbon and producing much of the world's oxygen. Their depth distribution in coral reefs including mesophotic coral reefs rely on the availability of carbon, nitrogen and photosynthetic potential. Macroalgae competition with existing coral communities creates coral bleaching. Their distribution in mesophotic coral reefs are determined by the temperature gradients where they prefer warmer temperatures.

=== Sponges ===
Sponges (also known as sea sponges) are the second most dominant taxon found in many coral reefs after corals. Sponges are largely dependent on planktonic food resources, both dissolved and particulate as water flows through their bodies providing them food and oxygen. They are able to create benthic diversity through filter feeding, creating essential habitat for many species of invertebrates and fish. Sponges are primarily mixotrophic (sources of energy and carbon) or heterotrophic (cannot produce its own food, taking nutrition from other sources of organic carbon). They prefer cold water environments, making them crucial inhabitants of the lower mesophotic coral reefs. MCEs contain many sponge species that differ to shallow reefs and that remain undescribed.

== Community ecology ==
Distinct bathymetric zonation patterns occur in the mesophotic coral reef. Corals are the dominant species and provide the most cover in the most upper regions of the mesophotic area (from 30 to 50 meters). In some coral reefs, the coral cover decreases with depth while sponge cover increases. In depths of over 50 meters, sponge become the dominant species however dense community of corals such as the scleractinian corals (stony corals) can be found at depths of 60 meters.

Coral cover begins to decline in the majority of mesophotic coral reefs at depths of 90 m as sunlight is low in these regions, limiting coral and macroalgae growth. The distribution of corals is also limited because of the changes in irradiance with depth and daily temperature fluctuations that can reach up to 4 °C.

== Temperature ==
Temperature is important for coral growth especially in the mesophotic region as sunlight does not penetrate fully. The ideal temperature for coral reefs globally is between 23 and 29 °C. In some instances, some corals can endure temperatures of up to 40 °C. Corals and coral reefs are usually unable to grow in temperatures that are below 18 °C. Temperatures between 15 and 16 °C are considered to be the limit for coral reefs to survive. Prolonged exposure to these temperatures can lead to mortality for most corals. A specific type of coral (hermatypic coral) was discovered to be able to survive in temperatures as low as 13 °C.

In high temperatures with high solar irradiance, coral bleaching usually occurs which is a phenomenon where corals releases their (zooxanthellae) living in their tissues draining the corals of its colors. They become white due to loss of the zooxanthellae and photosynthetic pigments which causes them to be under extreme amounts of stress and exposes them to high mortality rates.

Temperatures from the highest depths of the mesophotic coral reef differs from surface temperature of around 5 °C. The temperatures found at mesophotic coral reefs can vary due to surface temperature and events such as hurricanes and internal waves. Internal waves can induce fluctuations of the thermocline causing temperature in mesophotic coral reefs to vary from 10 to 20 °C.

== Research on MCEs ==
Research on mesophotic coral reefs have been limited until the 20th century because of the difficulty of conditions to observe them. A study in 2017 showed that a majority of research done on MCEs have been completed since 2010 (56% of total studies) and 15% of total studies being completed in 2016 alone. The same study suggests that we know less about mesophotic coral reefs than we originally thought as 57% of research have been conducted on reefs in the Atlantic region while Pacific mesophotic coral reefs remain understudied. There has been little to no research conducted in the regions of South East Asia and India. Research on these coral reefs remain currently highly biased on location and region while not representing oceans globally.

The best studied mesophotic coral reefs in the world are the northern coast of Jamaica, the Bahamas, the northern Gulf of Mexico, and Puerto Rico. The best studied area in non-Atlantic oceans are the Marshall Islands, the main Hawaiian Islands, Johnston Atoll, and the northern Red Sea. In 1973, biologist Thomas J. Goreau found that zooxanthellate coral species were common at the surface of Jamaican MCEs. Below 50 m, coral species diversity declined rapidly and sponges are more commonly found. Zooxanthellate corals, plate-like colonies of Agaricia and Leptoseris were the most common and were found up 99 m in depth. Other conducted studies in the following years found that Caribbean MCE's also possesses similar geomorphology and specie distribution as Goreau's discovery in 1973. Later research has proven that MCEs have many species that are endemic to the mesophotic region and require these depths and temperatures to reproduce.

Previous research has hypothesized that mesophotic coral reefs serves as a refuge for shallow reef species as they are less easily disturbed due to their depths. This hypothesis is argued to be false as the same disturbances that impact shallow reef species also impact mesophotic coral reefs. These impacts include hurricanes, thermal stress, pollution, sedimentation, and eutrophication resulting in significant mortality rates for all coral species.

== Ecosystem services ==
MCEs has ecosystem services that associated with shallow water coral reef. These ecosystem services include: habitat economically and ecologically for important species, potential for tourism and recovery to shallow population, discovery new essential substances and coastal protection. MCEs provide essential shelter for threaten and overexploitation species that allows species to grow, maintain diversity and support key ecological function. As a result, MCEs can help shallow reef recovery by provide juveniles to shallow areas. MCEs play important role to maintain fish production as most of economic fish are deep generalist and spawn between 30 and 110 m depth. In Pulley Ridge, Red snappers building their nest at 60–80 m depth and it provide larvae to shallow reefs, such as Florida Keys.

== Geomorphology and geological history ==
The function, growth and structure of mesophotic coral reefs are influenced by their geomorphology and geological history. Each mesophotic coral ecosystem are shaped by transgression and regression of sea levels during glacial and interglacial periods creating a unique environment. The substrate, the amount of nutrients coming from runoff, the attenuation of light, and the rates of sedimentation all influence the geomorphology of mesophotic coral reefs determining what communities are found in that specific location.

MCEs are located generally on fore-reef slopes adjacent to shallow-water coral reefs, deep-water rhodolith beds, and on isolated offshore banks on the continental shelf.

== Studied MCEs ==
North Coast of Jamaica

Bahamas and Belize

Northern Gulf of Mexico

Marshall Islands

Red sea

Hawaiian Archipelago and Johnston Atoll

== Threats ==
Mesophotic coral reefs faces the same threats as shallow reefs, such as bleaching events and intense storms. Previous research in the 20th and early 21st century hypothesized that they are less exposed to these threats than shallow reefs due to their depth. Furthermore, it is thought that by virtue of their depth and their remote offshore location, mesophotic reefs have better protection from direct human impact such as nutrient run-off and overfishing. However, more recent research done in 2016 proved that coral reefs situated in the path of hurricane Matthew (both shallow and mesophotic) suffered destruction. The mesophotic coral reefs were buried by sediments which caused significant mortality rates to the corals. Physical damage from corals and other debris falling down the reef wall were also present. Similar instances have also been observed when storms occurred at the Great Barrier Reef. These conducted researches prove that mesophotic coral reefs cannot serve as refuge for species from shallow reefs as they are also heavily impacted by anthropogenic disturbances and climate change.

Overexploitation from fisheries in shallow areas may lead to the perturbation of trophic level in deeper reefs. In addition bottom landings gear usage can cause physical damage to the reefs and stir up sediment that smother and kill coral. Climate change is a global threat to all coral reef ecosystem including mesophotic reefs. It causes the increase in sea surface temperature through the green house effect, ocean acidification and variability of temperature that involves in fluctuation of La Nina and El Nino. Other concerns are oil and gas exploration and cable and pipeline laying.

== Anthropogenic disturbances affecting MCEs ==
MCEs are vulnerable to global and local anthropogenic disturbances. It has been suggested that MCEs may be refugia from many global and localized anthropogenic impacts. This buffering has both a depth and distance from shore component. Further, as human pressure on coral reefs increases, MCEs will be subject to more disturbances in the future. The timing of increased disturbance will likely vary depending on ocean basin and the regional rates of warming, ocean acidification, and local human population growth.

The only coral reefs that show no signs of anthropogenic impact are those distant from a large population center. However, human activities such as the emission of greenhouse gasses and other activities that contribute towards climate change will have an effect on all coral reefs.

This human disruption is divided into several classification:

=== Global warming and thermal stress ===
Periods of anomalously high temperatures during the warmest part of the year can stimulate coral bleaching and mass mortalities and are considered one of the greatest existential threats to shallow-water coral reef ecosystems. For MCEs that are exposed to the UML during warm water temperature periods, their fate may be linked directly to shallow-water reefs. In addition recent evidence has demonstrated that scleractinian corals at mesophotic depths are susceptible to thermal stress and bleaching in the same manner as that experienced by shallow-water reefs.

=== Ocean acidification ===
Ocean acidification (OA) is a particularly broad threat facing all coral reef ecosystems. Research has not yet evaluated the specific effects on MCEs and hermatypic scleractinian corals. If similar to shallow-water reefs, as a result of OA, MCEs could see reductions in net community calcification, reductions in coral growth, and likely shifts to algae-dominated systems with a few resistant scleractinian taxa.

=== Pollution ===
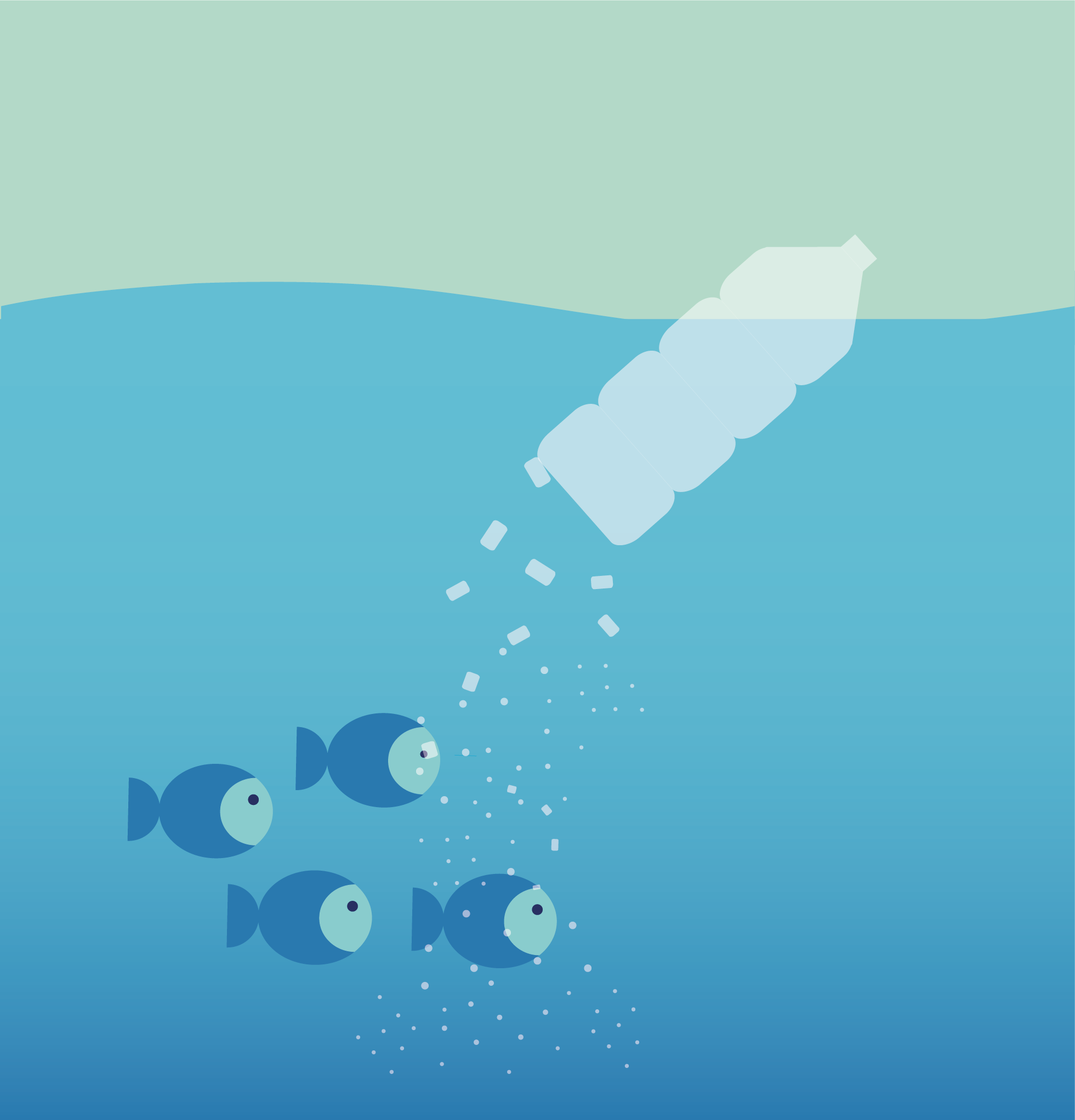
Pollution from land are often dumped directly into the ocean and affecting coral reefs including mesophotic and organisms that live within these ecosystems negatively.

Pollution from land and marine sources can directly and indirectly impact MCEs and cause disturbances. Sewage, toxins, and marine debris can be pumped or dumped directly into the marine environment or arrive as components of runoff from land.

In 2010, Deepwater Horizon oil spill damaged 770 square miles of deep sea habitats. Within these areas are four square miles of mesophotic coral reefs that were damaged.

=== Sedimentation ===
Despite distance away from human activities, many MCEs are impacted naturally and anthropogenically by sedimentation, i.e., the deposition of sediments from the water column onto benthic surfaces. Sedimentation rates are artificially increased in the marine environment by a variety of means, including runoff from land, dredge dumping, and alterations to water flow that change natural sedimentation patterns. While sediment burial from any source can be detrimental to living coral tissue, terrigenous sediments have been found to be particularly harmful.

=== Turbidity and light penetration ===
MCEs are generally light-limited systems and, thus, may be extremely vulnerable to reductions in light as a consequence of increased turbidity or rising sea level. At the deepest extent of their ranges, many stony coral species may be near their lower light limit, although many MCEs exhibit adaptations for efficient light capture. Human activities that increase water column turbidity include sediment runoff and dredge dumping (suspended sediment) and increased nutrient pollution that increases the abundance of phytoplankton and zooplankton. Long periods where light penetration is decreased (higher attenuation coefficients) could lead to light limitation of phototrophic corals, with concomitant partial bleaching and mortality.

=== Benthic infrastructure ===
Industrial infrastructure that is laid across the seafloor or built upon the seafloor could impact MCEs. In particular, cables and pipes used for energy, material, and data transfer are employed worldwide and in areas with MCEs. The initial emplacement and settling of cables could directly damage and kill habitat-forming corals and other sessile organisms, and maintenance activities where the cables are retrieved and replaced on the bottom could further these impacts. However, once settled and secure on the seafloor, cables can become part of the reef structure and are colonized by sessile organisms.

=== Mechanical disturbance ===
There is a great potential for MCEs to be damaged by mechanical disturbance, which causes the physical displacement and movement of corals. Since MCEs are under-described, their presence is poorly known to society, and activities such as anchoring in mesophotic depths may be considered non-detrimental. At the same time, many plating colony morphologies particularly common in MCEs are susceptible to breakage. Fishing gear (e.g., nets, traps, and lines) are commonly entangled and abandoned in MCEs.

=== Fishing and collection ===
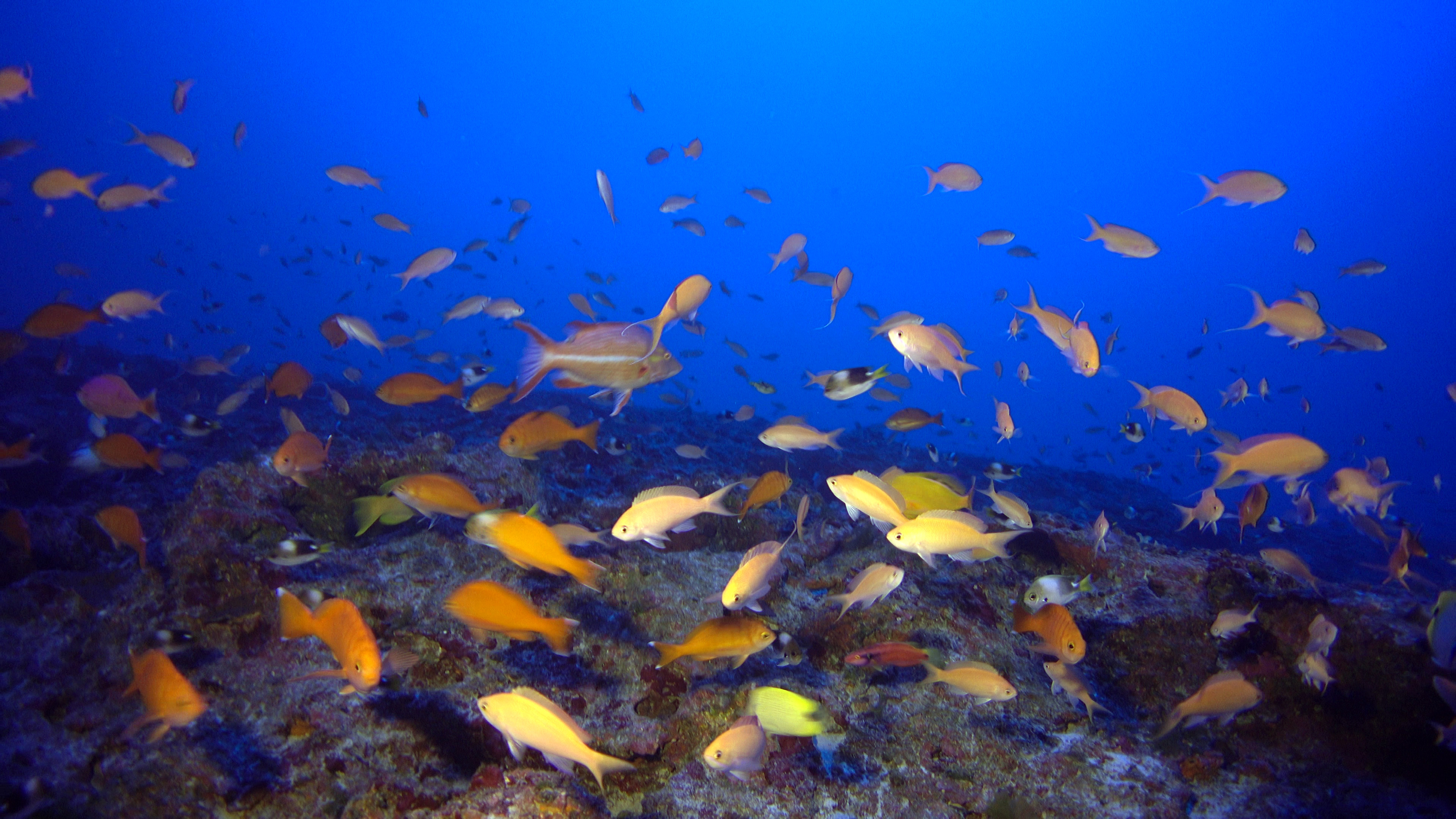
This image is a frame from a video taken at a depth of 90 m which is in the mesophotic region, off Kure Atoll, within the Papahānaumokuākea Marine National Monument in the Northwestern Hawaiian Islands. Removal of one species can alter the native environment.

Organisms can be removed by fishing for consumption, collection for the aquarium, medicinal, and curio trade, and inadvertent loss or out-migration from other activities or factors, such as introductions of predators and incidence of disease. Thus, removal for one organism, especially who play an important role in MCEs, put those environmental into any further risk.

=== Diseases ===
MCEs are not immune to disease disturbances, they suffer the impact of diseases similarly to shallow coral reefs. Stony corals are susceptible to diseases that appear to be increasing in frequency and impact on community structure. Some coral diseases are also showing the ability to transmit between colonies through direct contact and waterborne transmission. While disease can reflect the signs of coral death due to environmental causes, the ability of disease to transmit between colonies and undergo outbreaks of high prevalence at the colony level indicates disease is a multiplier of environmental stress and disturbance.

=== Invasive species ===
Invasive species that are introduced to a novel biogeographic range or are native but released by ecological forces have been demonstrated to act as a disturbance in MCEs. Introduced or invasive sessile organisms can also reside in and impact MCEs. For example, algae of the genus Ramicrusta (Peyssonneliaceae) have recently appeared in the Caribbean where they were absent or rare and have become successful space competitors. The algae are able to overtop edges of living stony corals and other benthic organisms, causing death of underlying tissue.

== Conservation ==
As of now, there is still little knowledge about mesophotic coral reefs. This makes it difficult for conservation efforts to be conducted as they are out of human reach and a vast majority of MCEs remain undiscovered or unsurveyed. Many of these coral reefs have already been damaged by climate change and human activities such as fishing, mining and sedimentation.

Organizations such as the National Center for Coastal Ocean Science and the Coral Reef Research Foundation have started work on projects that will better understand and help restore mesophotic coral reefs. Some of the projects include seafloor mapping (bathymetry), habitat modelling with the goal to better understand these habitats which leads to better management.

== See also ==
- Deep-water coral
- Coral Reefs
- Fossil Coral Reef — National Natural Landmark in Le Roy, New York
- Census of Coral Reefs — Field project of the Census of Marine Life
- Sponge reef
