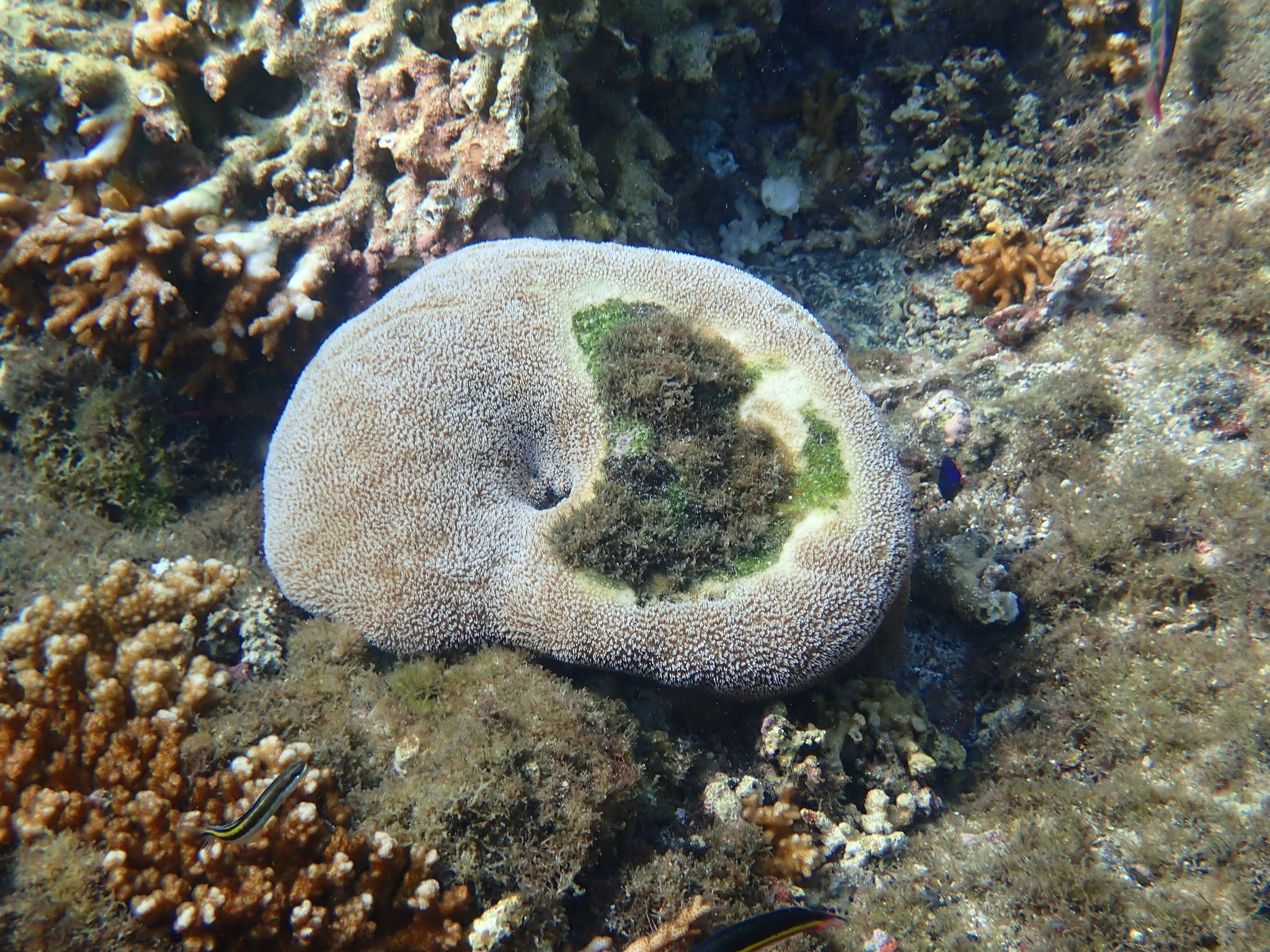

Conservation status
- Near Threatened (IUCN 3.1)

Scientific classification
- Kingdom: Animalia
- Phylum: Cnidaria
- Subphylum: Anthozoa
- Class: Hexacorallia
- Order: Scleractinia
- Family: Agariciidae
- Genus: Pavona
- Species: P. gigantea

Binomial name
- Pavona gigantea (Verrill, 1869)

= Pavona gigantea =

Species of cnidarian

Pavona gigantea is a species of colonial stony coral from the genus Pavona. The species was originally described by Addison Emery Verrill in 1869.
