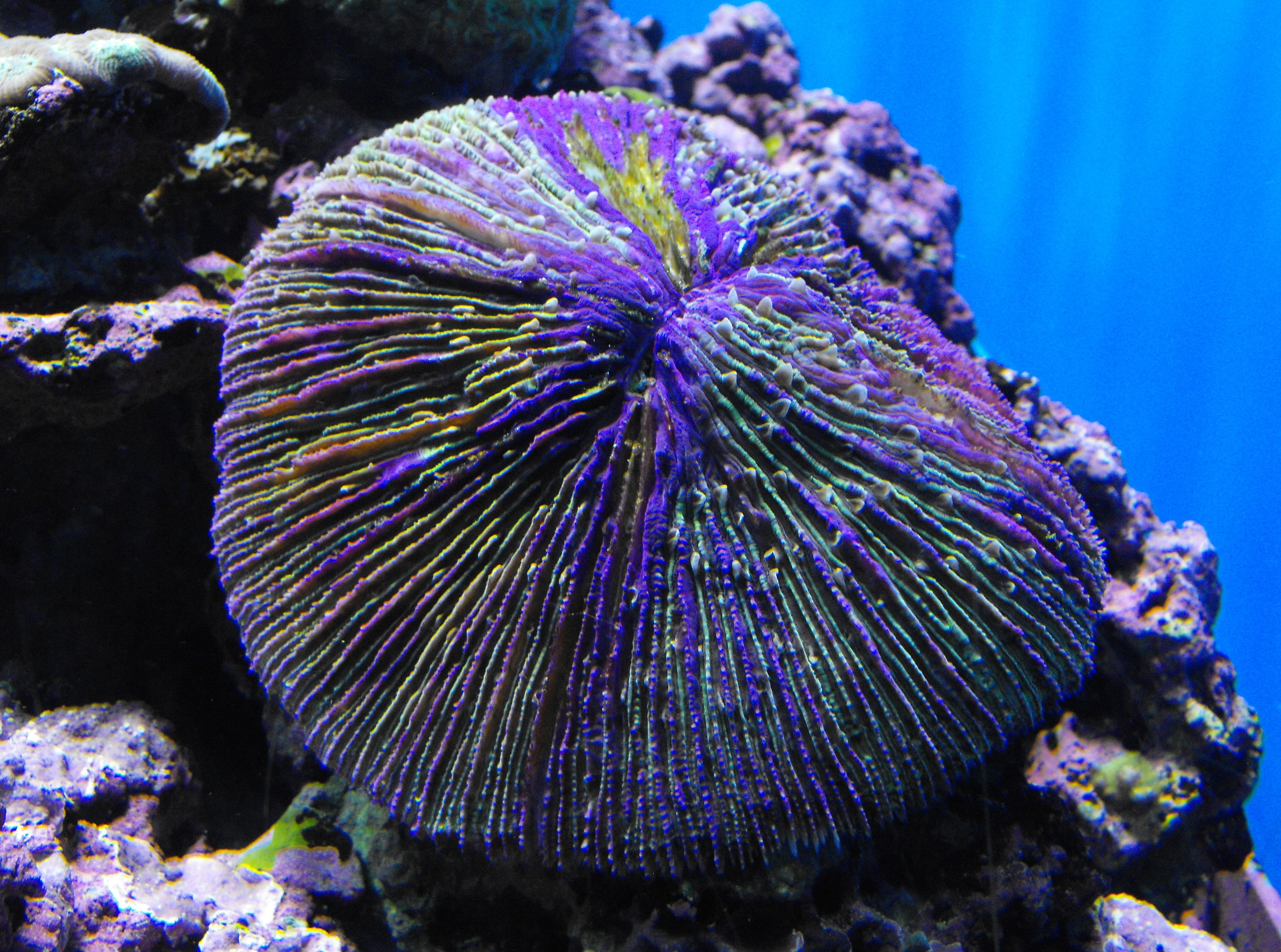

Conservation status
- Least Concern (IUCN 3.1)

Scientific classification
- Kingdom: Animalia
- Phylum: Cnidaria
- Subphylum: Anthozoa
- Class: Hexacorallia
- Order: Scleractinia
- Family: Agariciidae
- Genus: Pavona
- Species: P. varians

Binomial name
- Pavona varians Verrill, 1864

= Pavona varians =

Species of coral

Pavona varians, also known by its common name corrugated coral, is a species from the genus Pavona. Pavona varians is a type of hermatypic coral commonly distributed across tropic environments. Distribution of the coral include the equatorial Indian and Pacific Ocean, and notably, not found in the Atlantic Ocean. Pavona varians have also been found to be distributed as North as the sea of Japan, in the Red Sea, and islands off the Pacific coast of Columbia and Costa Rica. Pavona varians are typically found an average of 45 feet below water on vertical surfaces in turbid, nutrient rich, water. Specifically, Pavona varians are found between crevices of the reef crest habitats and back reef habitats, including lagoons.

The Pavona varians are an encrusting species of coral that vary in color and tend to have red polyps, a green coenosteum, as well as blue mouths. Pavona varians differ in structure from many of the other polyps in their genus as they have unique ridges and sometimes take on a cup-like form. Pavona varians typically grow small plate-like colonies no larger than 25 centimeters on rocky surfaces, preferably in calm waters. Researchers have noted the coral's ability to rapidly colonize environments where other species of coral have either died or struggled to colonize. Notably, Pavona varians has been able to colonize areas where once large colonies of Goniopora and Porites once were distributed.
