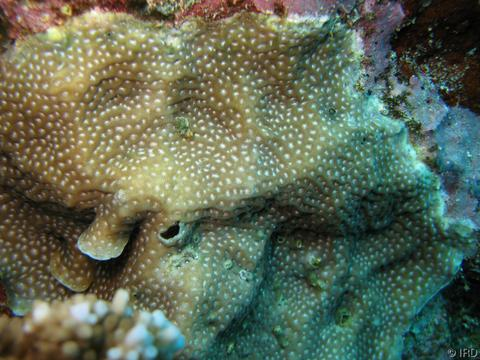
- Pavona bipartita in New Caledonia

Conservation status
- Least Concern (IUCN 3.1)

Scientific classification
- Kingdom: Animalia
- Phylum: Cnidaria
- Subphylum: Anthozoa
- Class: Hexacorallia
- Order: Scleractinia
- Family: Agariciidae
- Genus: Pavona
- Species: P. bipartita

Binomial name
- Pavona bipartita Nemenzo, 1980

= Pavona bipartita =

Species of coral

Pavona bipartita, sometimes known as leaf coral, is a species of colonial stony coral in the family Agariciidae. It is found in shallow water, on reef slopes and on vertical surfaces, in tropical parts of the western and central Indo-Pacific region.

== Description ==
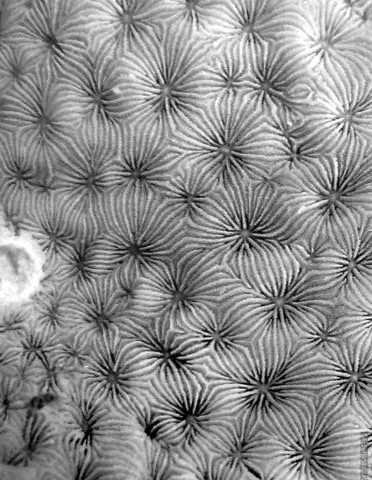
Corallites of Pavona bipartita

Colonies of Pavona bipartita are either submassive or encrusting, and can be a metre (yard) across. The corallites are shallow depressions with poorly defined walls. They are evenly distributed over the undulating surface of the colony, and there are a network of uneven raised ridges between them. The columella are small and the septacostae extend over the ridges and are arranged in two alternating orders. This coral is usually some shade of brown.

== Distribution and habitat ==
Pavona bipartita is native to the western and central Indo-Pacific region. Its range extends from East Africa and the Red Sea to Japan, the East China Sea, the Philippines, Papua New Guinea and eastern Australia. It is an uncommon species and occurs on reef slopes and vertical surfaces, at depths down to about 20 metres (66 ft).

== Status ==
The conservation status of Pavona bipartita has been assessed by the International Union for Conservation of Nature as being "vulnerable". The population trend is unknown, but this coral is susceptible to bleaching, and it is likely that the number of mature colonies is decreasing as a result of destruction of its reef habitats.
