= Malaulalo =

Island in Makira-Ulawa Province, Solomon Islands

Coordinates: 10.186°S 161.946°E

Malaulalo is an inhabited island in Solomon Islands; it is the central one of the Olu Malau (Three Sisters) Islands located in Makira-Ulawa Province. It has an area of 3.34 km^{2}.

The first recorded sighting by Europeans of Malaulalo was by the Spanish expedition of Álvaro de Mendaña in May 1568. More precisely the sighting of Malaulalo was due to a local voyage that set out from Guadalcanal in a small boat, in the accounts the brigantine Santiago, commanded by Alférez Hernando Énriquez and having Hernán Gallego as pilot. They charted the three Olu Malau islands as Las Tres Marias (The Three Marys in Spanish).

The waters off of Malaulalo are home to the world's largest individual coral colony, of the species Pavona clavus, which is likely centuries old.

== See also ==
- Desert island
- List of islands
