= Coenosarc =

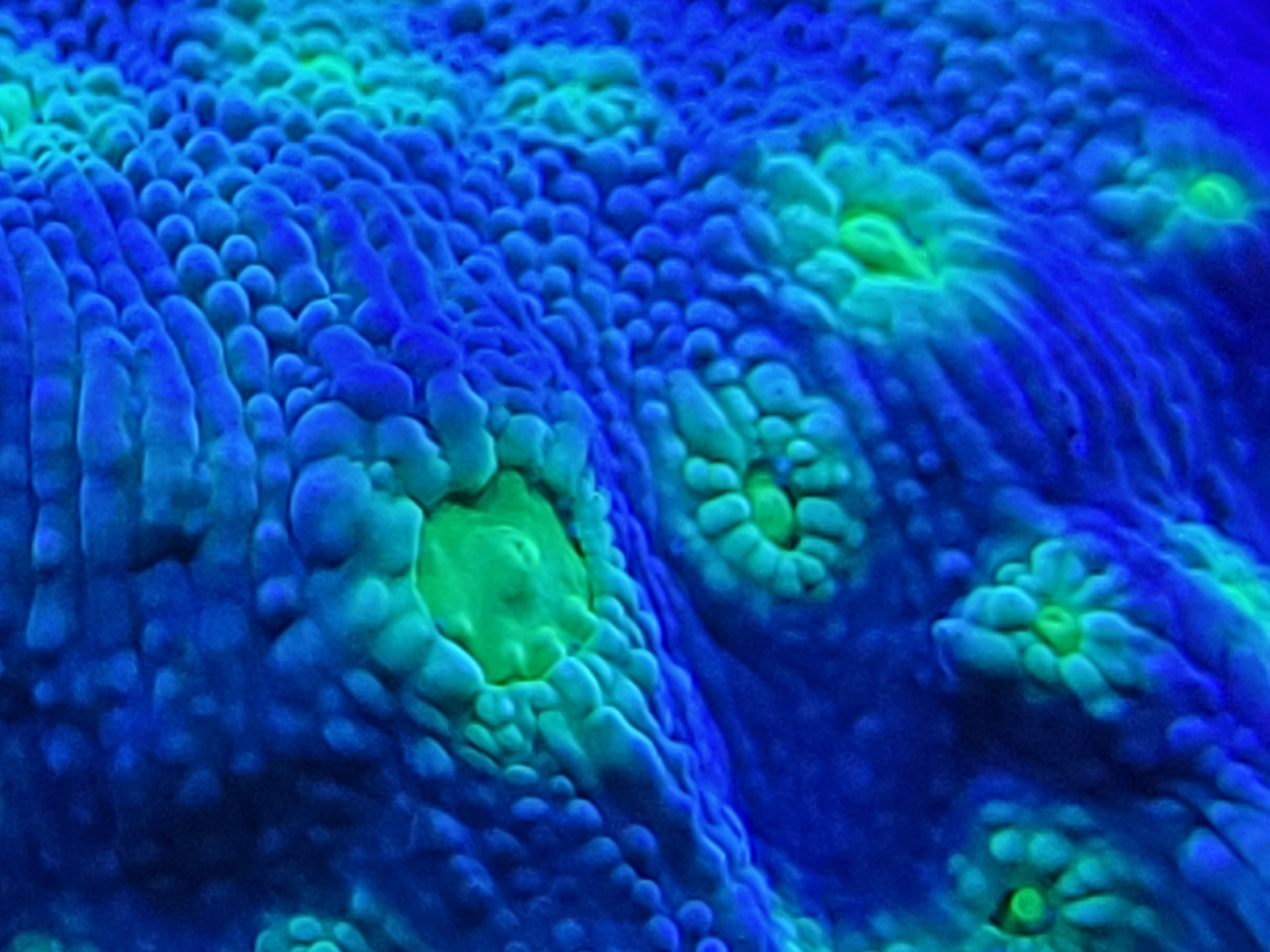
Coenosarc (blue) and polyps (green) of Echinopora lamellosa

In corals, the coenosarc is the living tissue overlying the stony skeletal material of the coral. It secretes the coenosteum, the layer of skeletal material lying between the corallites (the stony cups in which the polyps sit). The coenosarc is composed of mesogloea between two thin layers of epidermis and is continuous with the body wall of the polyps. The coenosarc contains the gastrovascular canal system that links the polyps and allow them to share nutrients and symbiotic zooxanthellae.
