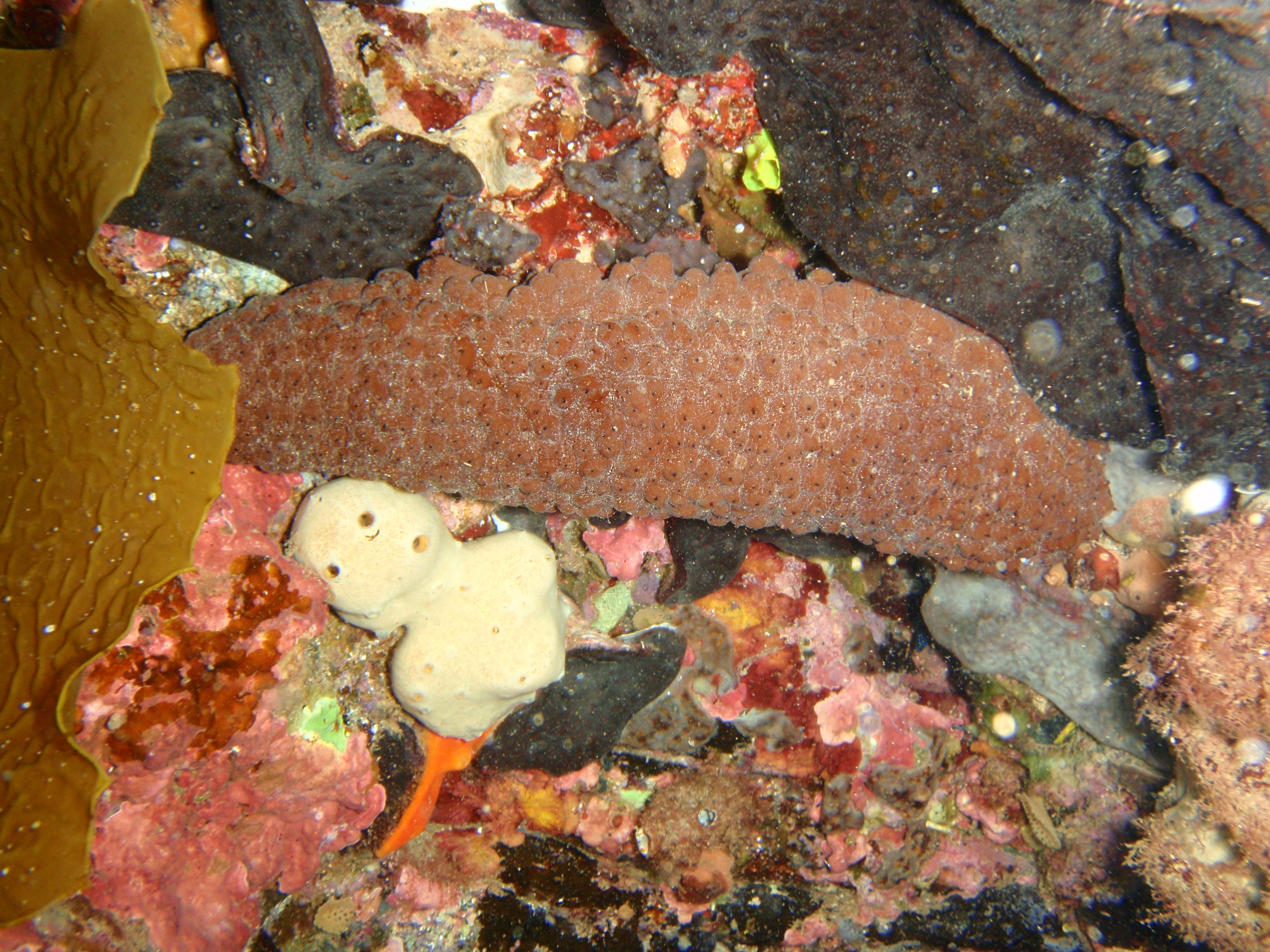

Conservation status
- Least Concern (IUCN 3.1)

Scientific classification
- Kingdom: Animalia
- Phylum: Echinodermata
- Class: Holothuroidea
- Order: Synallactida
- Family: Stichopodidae
- Genus: Australostichopus; Levin in Moraes, Norhcote, Kalinin, Avilov, Silchenko & Dmitrenok, 2004
- Species: A. mollis

Binomial name
- Australostichopus mollis (Hutton, 1872)

Synonyms
- (Species): Holothuria mollis Hutton, 1872; Stichopus mollis (Hutton, 1872)

= Australostichopus =

Australasian sea cucumber

Genus of sea cucumbers

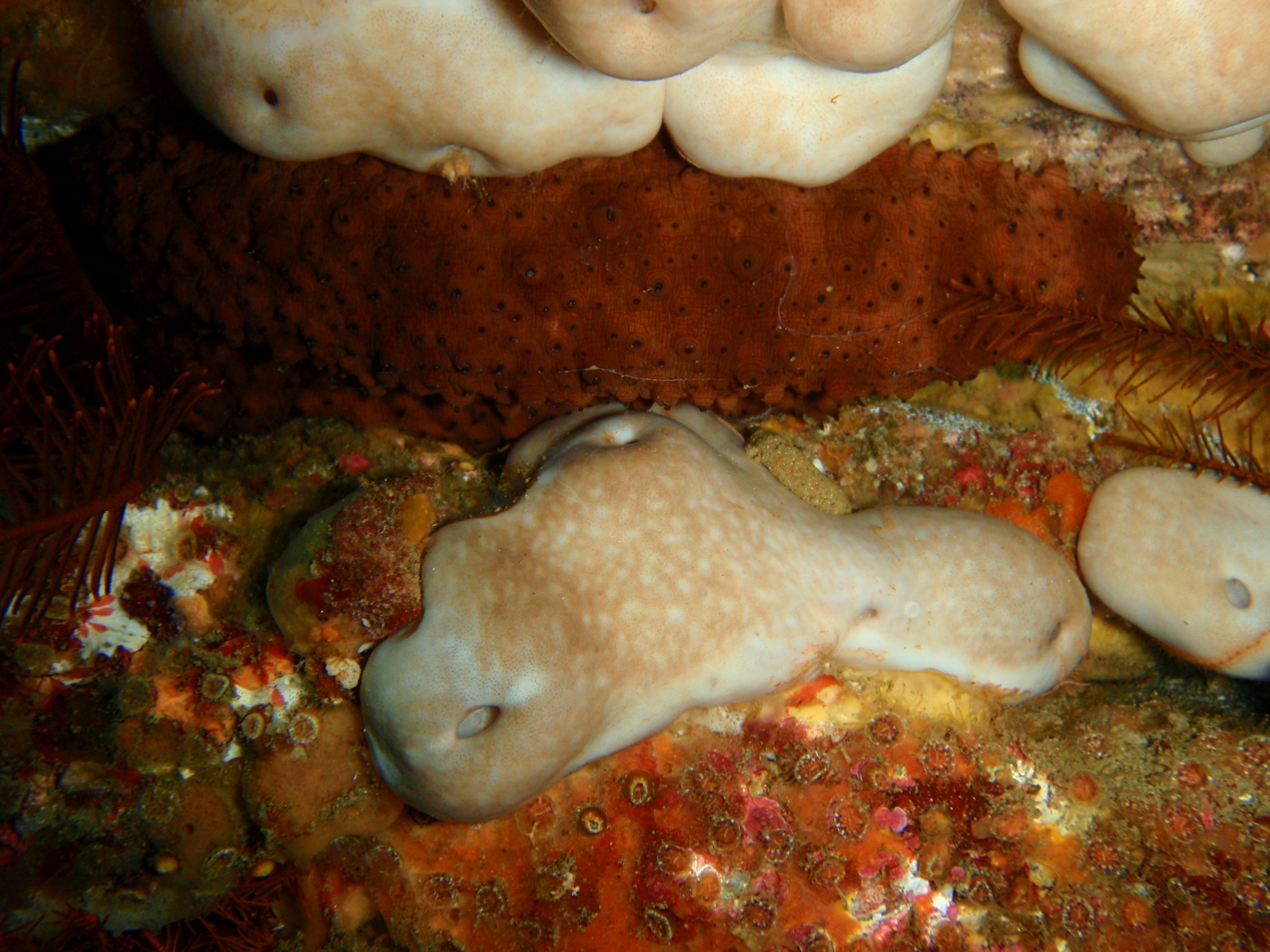
Australostichopus mollis at Bicheno, Tasmania

Australostichopus is a genus of sea cucumbers in the family Stichopodidae. It is monotypic, being represented by the single species Australostichopus mollis, commonly known as the brown sea cucumber or Australasian sea cucumber. This species has stimulated interest for its fishery potential in the Southern Hemisphere, and for its capability to reduce waste produced by aquaculture. Despite its ecological role and abundance in New Zealand coastal waters, the scarcity of knowledge regarding A. mollis biology and ecology has hindered the development of a stable fishery industry. Importantly, A. mollis represents promising business potential within an important Asian market. Recently its potential as a functional food has been evaluated, highlighting the nutritious components

== Distribution ==
In New Zealand, A. mollis is found around the entire coast line of the country, sometimes co-existing with reef structures; and from New South Wales to south Western Australia. The species principally inhabits the littoral at low tide level on sand, as well as in mud in protected areas. Their vertical range goes from shallows waters on the coast to around 200 metres of depth.

== Anatomy ==
Adult size is typically from 13 to 25 cm. Body is soft, and colour varies from light mottled brown to black. A tube foot is present ventrally or extending up the whole body. Tentacles (20) with disc shaped tips surround the slit-like mouth. Retractor muscles are absent. Dorsally, A. mollis has pointed papillae which can be reduced on preservation.

== Feeding ==
Described as detritivores, A. mollis mainly capture particles of organic matter from the substrata, which is highly nutritious.

== Reproduction ==
Via sexual reproduction, and sexes are generally separate, however some hermaphrodites have been found. Population sex ratio is 1:1. Reproductive season is from October to February, and periodicity of spawning is regulated by lunar cycles, specifically following a full moon. Morphologic changes in reproductive periods include females changes in gonad colour and oocyte numbers, while in males there is an increase in the amount of spermatozoa in particular zones described as "wet mounts of 'mashed' gonad tissue". Furthermore, there is an increase in spermatozoa in the lumen of histological sections. Studies suggest that spawning may occur repeatedly during a single reproductive season.

== Auto-evisceration ==
Like other holothurians, A. mollis has the ability to regenerate its internal organs after undergoing a phenomenon called auto-evisceration. This process, which is thought to be induced by external stimuli, is characterized by violent and rapid expulsion of organs, followed by regeneration, which occurs at a slower rate than in other genera. Nevertheless, a more recent study reports no spontaneous evisceration or seasonal atrophy of the viscera, highlighting that handling these organisms does not trigger such reactions and even suggesting than during predation it would not occur easily.

== Predation ==
Available information posits the existence of just one predator: the starfish Luidia varia, observed in two cases. To date there is no evidence to suggest any fish or other organism preying on A. mollis.

== Juveniles ==
Juveniles are distributed in the shallow sub-tidal zone (5–8 m of depth), relatively close to where adults are concentrated. However, they are usually found in a different substrata; one of smaller grain size, and associated to macroalgae as initial settlement, where they obtain detritus and protection from predators. These factors are thought to drive distribution, rather than and food type and availability. Experimental data shows high survival rates of juveniles using a natural diet, and still higher rates in a mussel waste medium. Thanks to attempts to produce juveniles in a commercial scale a better understanding of early post-settlement juveniles' growth and pigmentation process has been achieved

== Fishery ==
Processed sea cucumbers are traded under the name of beche-de-mer, representing an important fishery in South Pacific and Asian nations. In New Zealand, where its exploitation occurs on a small-scale, this species is under the New Zealand fisheries quota management system and is principally caught by free-diving. Sea cucumber yields can be very profitable if the resource is adequately processed, or if a value-added policy is implemented. Currently, due to the expansion of commercial exploitation of A. mollis in New Zealand and Australia, first attempts at massive culture are being carried out. A new approach to sea cucumber farming has been the so-called polyculture, where sea cucumber are bred together with mussels and finfish, consuming the wastes from nearby farming as a food supply, and at the same time providing new products. Trials farming sea cucumber with abalone have shown not to be biologically viable.

== Larvae development ==
The complete larvae stage takes approximately 21 days. After fertilization there are seven stages of larva metamorphosis: cleavage, blastocyst, gastrulation, auricularia (subdivided in early, mid, late), doliolaria (mid metamorphic stage pre settlement), penttactula and the last settled sea cucumber larva, visible to the naked human eye, which develops into the final organism.

== Polycultures ==
Considering the detritus-feeding characteristic of holothurians, and their role on coastal marine systems, several studies have focussed on their grazing effect on sediments. These studies have calculated declines in total organic carbon and chlorophyll a and phaeopigment accumulation, positioning A. mollis as an effective tool to avoid, restore and control pollutive impacts of coastal bivalve aquaculture.

In terms of evaluating the feasibility of polycultures, this has been evaluated in the field under Greenshell mussel and Pacific oysters' farms. In land based systems, according to the energetic requirements of adult sea cucumbers, results have inferred that waste production of an industry standard-type abalone lacks sufficient energy to meet A. mollis metabolic needs. However, there is suggestion that feeding juveniles from these wastes could be feasible. Conversely, waste generation from fresh mussels have proven to be the source of enough energy to sustain juvenile stocks, assuming a suitable scale to ensure the supply. Sea cucumbers also have been used as bioremediation units in scenarios of high organic waste pollution from farming, such as salmon. In this instance, this carbon source is transformed into body tissue; an example of efficiently using supplies and producing an alternative culture.
