= Coenosteum =

In corals, the coenosteum is the stony skeletal material secreted by the coenosarc, the layer of living material lying between the corallites (the stony cups in which the polyps sit). The coenosteum is composed of aragonite, a crystalline form of calcium carbonate, and is generally a spongy, porous material. Sometimes the coenosteum has ornamentation such as ridges and beads, visible as raised areas of the coenosarc. The coenosteum and corallites together are known as the corallum.
