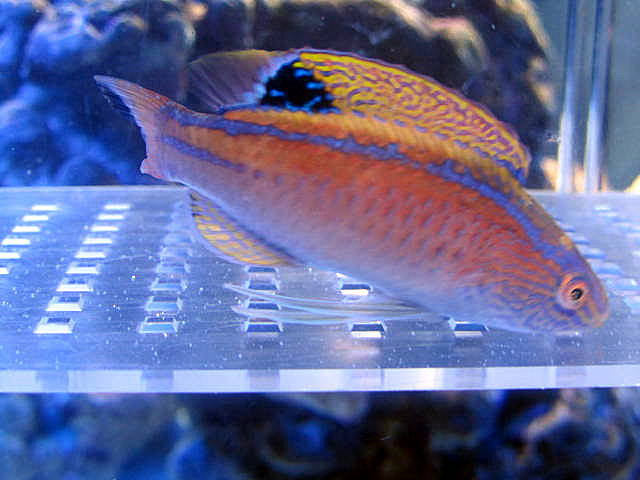
- Cirrhilabrus briangreenei, a species that historically was confused with C. pylei (see text)

Conservation status
- Least Concern (IUCN 3.1)

Scientific classification
- Kingdom: Animalia
- Phylum: Chordata
- Class: Actinopterygii
- Order: Labriformes
- Family: Labridae
- Genus: Cirrhilabrus
- Species: C. pylei

Binomial name
- Cirrhilabrus pylei G. R. Allen & J. E. Randall, 1996

= Cirrhilabrus pylei =

Species of fairy wrasse

Cirrhilabrus pylei, commonly called the blue-margin fairy-wrasse or Pyle's wrasse, is a species of fairy wrasse. It can be found in depths of 55 to 82 m (180–269 ft) in Indonesia, Papua New Guinea, Solomon Islands and Vanuatu; reports from the Philippines is due to confusion with C. briangreenei. C. pylei can be kept in aquariums and is known for its peaceful temperament. The fish has also been known to jump from tanks.

== Description ==
C. pylei has a typical adult length of 3 to 5 in (7.6–12.7 cm). The species has 11 dorsal spines, nine dorsal soft rays, 3 anal spines, and 9 anal soft rays. The species has a coloration of peach to salmon. Until 2020, it was commonly confused with C. briangreenei of the Philippines; the most distinct differences are that adult males of C. briangreenei have a large blackish spot on the dorsal fin and a blackish tip of the tail, which are lacking in C. pylei.

== Behavior ==
The species is carnivorous and in an aquarium setting it will feed on small animal prey like brine shrimp and mysis shrimp.

== Etymology ==
The specific name of this fish honours the ichthyologist Richard Pyle. of the Bishop Museum (Honolulu), who collected type specimen.
