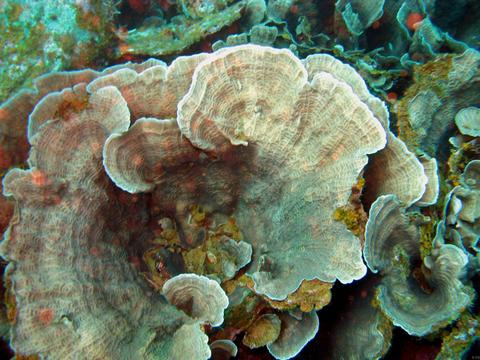
- Leptoseris yabei

Scientific classification
- Kingdom: Animalia
- Phylum: Cnidaria
- Subphylum: Anthozoa
- Class: Hexacorallia
- Order: Scleractinia
- Family: Agariciidae
- Genus: Leptoseris; Milne Edwards & Haime, 1849

= Leptoseris =

Genus of corals

Leptoseris is a genus of corals belonging to the family Agariciidae.

The genus has almost cosmopolitan distribution. Leptoseris corals are found all over tropical waters in the Indo-Pacific ocean and over a range of depths but mainly the mesophotic zones. Leptoseris can be observed at depths ranging from shallow to extreme depths (over 100m).

They have a mutualistic relationship with microalgae called Symbiodinium that gives them the flexibility of photo-acclimatization and photoadaptation to the varying depths.

== Species ==
This genus holds the following species:

- Leptoseris Kalaanensis Licuanan, W.Y.; Aliño, 2009
- Leptoseris hawaiiensis
- Leptoseris scaraba
- Leptoseris alternans Gerth, 1923
- Leptoseris amitoriensis Veron, 1990
