= Hermatypic coral =

Reef building corals

Hermatypic corals are those corals in the order Scleractinia which build reefs by depositing hard calcareous material for their skeletons, forming the stony framework of the reef. Corals that do not contribute to coral reef development are referred to as ahermatypic (non-reef-building) species.

Many reef-forming corals contain symbiotic photosynthetic zooxanthellae, which contribute to their nutritional needs. The term "hermatypic" is sometimes misused, being assumed to apply to all zooxanthellate corals. However, there are zooxanthellae in many non reef-forming corals; and not all hermatypic corals in shallow water contain zooxanthellae. Further, some hermatypic corals live at depths to which light cannot penetrate; they form deep-water reefs but do not harbour the symbionts.
