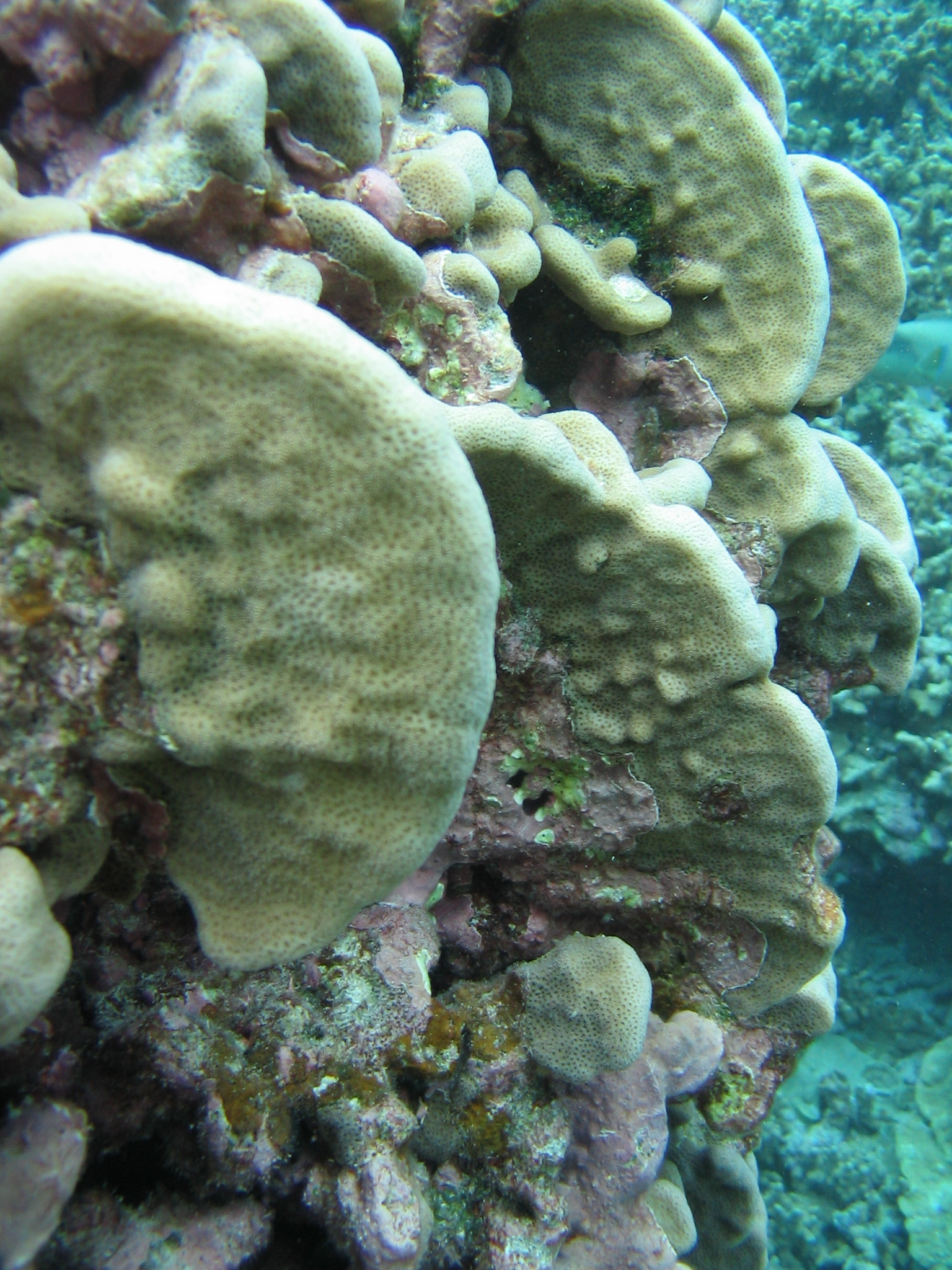
- Pavona duerdeni

Scientific classification
- Kingdom: Animalia
- Phylum: Cnidaria
- Subphylum: Anthozoa
- Class: Hexacorallia
- Order: Scleractinia
- Suborder: Fungiina
- Family: Agariciidae; Gray, 1847

Genera
- See text

= Agariciidae =

Family of corals

The Agariciidae are a family of reef-building stony corals. This family includes cactus corals, plate corals, and lettuce corals. Members of the family include symbiotic algae called zooxanthellae in their tissues which help provide their energy requirements.

== Description ==
Members of this family are colonial, hermatypic (reef-building) corals. The corals form massive structures, often of a laminar or foliate form. The corallites are linked by the closely packed septa which have smooth or finely toothed margins and do not fuse together. The corallites do not stand out from the surface of the coral and have ill-defined walls formed by a thickening of the septa.

== Genera ==
The World Register of Marine Species includes these genera in the family:

- Agaricia Lamarck, 1801 - most species form thin vertical plates, but in some, the plates are horizontal.
- Coeloseris Vaughan, 1918 - monotypic, the single species is Coeloseris mayeri, the tombstone coral.
- Dactylotrochus Wells, 1954 - monotypic, the single species is Dactylotrochus cervicornis
- Gardineroseris Scheer & Pillai, 1974 - monotypic, the single species is Gardineroseris planulata, Gardiner's coral.
- Helioseris - monotypic, the single species is Helioseris cucullata, the sunray lettuce coral.
- Leptoseris Milne-Edwards & Haime, 1849 - species are either crustose or laminar in form. They frequently have striations.
- Pavona Lamarck, 1801 - displays various forms, some being massive and others frond-like.
