= Alteromonas hispanica =

Scientific classification
- Domain: Bacteria
- Kingdom: Pseudomonadati
- Phylum: Pseudomonadota
- Class: Gammaproteobacteria
- Order: Alteromonadales
- Family: Alteromonadaceae
- Genus: Alteromonas
- Species: A. hispanica

Binomial name
- Alteromonas hispanica Martínez-Checa et al., 2005

Species of bacterium

Alteromonas hispanica is a marine bacterium.
