= Alteromonas marina =

Scientific classification
- Domain: Bacteria
- Kingdom: Pseudomonadati
- Phylum: Pseudomonadota
- Class: Gammaproteobacteria
- Order: Alteromonadales
- Family: Alteromonadaceae
- Genus: Alteromonas
- Species: A. marina

Binomial name
- Alteromonas marina Yoon et al., 2003

Synonyms
- Alteromonas marina Yoon et al., 2003

Species of bacterium

Alteromonas marina is a marine bacterium.
