= Alteromonas addita =

Scientific classification
- Domain: Bacteria
- Kingdom: Pseudomonadati
- Phylum: Pseudomonadota
- Class: Gammaproteobacteria
- Order: Alteromonadales
- Family: Alteromonadaceae
- Genus: Alteromonas
- Species: A. addita

Binomial name
- Alteromonas addita Ivanova et al., 2005

Species of bacterium

Alteromonas addita is a marine bacterium.
