= Alteromonas =

Scientific classification
- Domain: Bacteria
- Kingdom: Pseudomonadati
- Phylum: Pseudomonadota
- Class: Gammaproteobacteria
- Order: Alteromonadales
- Family: Alteromonadaceae
- Genus: Alteromonas; Baumann et al. 1972

Type species
- Alteromonas macleodii

Species
- A. addita A. genovensis A. hispanica A. litorea A. macleodii A. marina A. simiduii A. stellipolaris A. tagae

Genus of bacteria

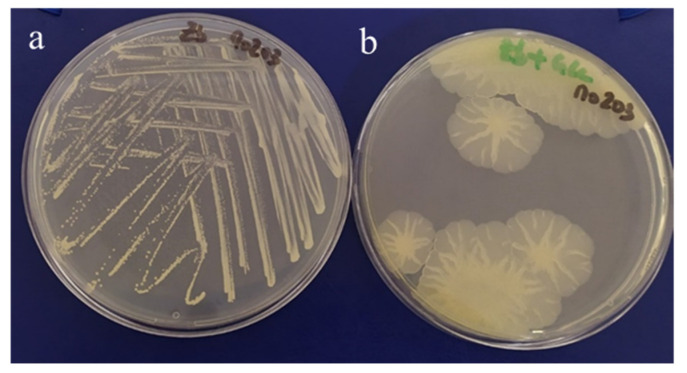
Petri dish containing a strain of alteromonas

Alteromonas is a genus of Pseudomonadota found in sea water, either in the open ocean or in the coast. It is Gram-negative. Its cells are curved rods with a single polar flagellum.

== Etymology ==
The etymology of the genus is Latin alter -tera -terum, another, different; monas (μονάς), a noun with a special meaning in microbiology used to mean unicellular organism; to give Alteromonas, another monad

Members of the genus Alteromonas can be referred to as alteromonads (viz. Trivialisation of names).

== Authority ==
The genus was described by Baumann et al. in 1972, but was emended by Novick and Tyler 1985 to accommodate Alteromonas luteoviolacea (now Pseudoalteromonas luteoviolacea), Gauthier et al. 1995, who split the genus in two (Pseudoalteromonas) and Van Trappen et al. in 2004 to accommodate Alteromonas stellipolaris.

== Shipworm symbiont ==
"Alteromonas-like sub-group" has been identified by microbial culture, metagenomics, and FISH-probe microscopy in the typhlosole sub-organ of the shipworm cecum as a symbiont digesting lignin.

== Species ==
The genus contains eight species (but 21 basonyms), namely

- A. addita (Ivanova et al. 2005, added, joined to the genus)
- A. genovensis ( Vandecandelaere et al. 2008, genovensis, pertaining to Genova (Genoa), Italy, where the seawater electroactive biofilms originated)
- A. hispanica ( Martínez-Checa et 'al. 2005, hispanica, Spanish)
- A. litorea ( Yoon et al.. 2004, litorea, of the shore)
- A. macleodii ( Baumann et al. 1972 (type species of the genus, named after R.A. MacLeod, a Canadian microbiologist who pioneered studies on the biochemical bases of the Na^{+} requirement of marine bacteria)
- A. marina ( Yoon et al.. 2003, marina, of the sea, marine)
- A. simiduii ( Chiu et al.. 2007, named after Usio Simidu, a Japanese microbiologist, for his work on marine microbiology)
- A. stellipolaris ( Van Trappen et al.. 2004, stella, star; polaris, polar, referring to the Polarstern (AWI, Bremerhaven), the name of the vessel that was used to collect the sample from which the organisms were isolated)
- A. tagae ( Chiu et al.. 2007, named after Nobuo Taga, a pioneering Japanese marine microbiologist)

== Former alteromonads ==
Many alteromonads were reclassified as members of Pseudoalteromonas in 1995

- P. atlantica (Akagawa-Matsushita et al.. 1992, atlantica, pertaining to the Atlantic Ocean)
- P. aurantia (Gauthier and Breittmayer 1979, aurantia, orange-colored)
- P. carrageenovora (Akagawa-Matsushita et al.. 1992, carrageenum, named for carrageenan; vorare, to devour - carrageenan decomposing)
- P. citrea (Gauthier 1977, citrea, of or pertaining to the citrus-tree, intended to mean lemon-yellow)
- P. denitrificans (Enger et al.. 1987, denitrificans, denitrifying)
- P. distincta (Romanenko et al. 1995, distincta, separate, distinct)
- P. elyakovii (Ivanova et al.. 1997, named after G.B. Elyakov for his work in microbial biotechnology)
- P. espejiana (Chan et al.. 1978, named after Espejo, a Chilean microbiologist who isolated one of the first lipid-containing bacteriophages)
- P. fuliginea (Romanenko et al.. 1995, fuliginea, like soot, sooty)
- P. haloplanktis ((ZoBell and Upham 1944) Reichelt and Baumann 1973, hals halos, sea; planktos -ê -on, wandering, roaming, sea-wandering)
- P. luteoviolacea ((ex Gauthier 1976) Gauthier 1982, luteus, yellow; violaceus - violet-colored; luteoviolacea, yellow-violet)
- P. nigrifaciens ((ex White 1940) Baumann et al. 1984, Niger, black; facio, to make to give nigrifaciens, making black)
- P. rubra (Gauthier 1976, rubra, red)
- P. tetraodonis (Simidu et al.. 1990, tetraodonis, of Tetraodon, a genus of plectognathic fishes [Tetraodontidae])
- P. undina (Chan et al.. 1978, undina, undine, water nymph)

Other former alteromonads:

- Marinomonas communis (Baumann et al.. 1972, communis, common)
- Marinomonas vaga (Baumann et al.. 1972, vaga, wandering)
- Shewanella colwelliana (Weiner et al.. 1988, named after Rita Colwell for her contributions to marine microbiology)
- Shewanella hanedai (Jensen et al.. 1981, named after Y. Haneda, a Japanese biologist who pioneered studies on bioluminescence)
- Shewanella putrefaciens ((ex Derby and Hammer 1931) Lee et al.. 1981, putrefaciens, making rotten, putrefying)
