= Alteromonas tagae =

Scientific classification
- Domain: Bacteria
- Kingdom: Pseudomonadati
- Phylum: Pseudomonadota
- Class: Gammaproteobacteria
- Order: Alteromonadales
- Family: Alteromonadaceae
- Genus: Alteromonas
- Species: A. tagae

Binomial name
- Alteromonas tagae Chiu et al., 2007

Species of bacterium

Alteromonas tagae is a marine bacterium.
