= Alteromonas stellipolaris =

Scientific classification
- Domain: Bacteria
- Kingdom: Pseudomonadati
- Phylum: Pseudomonadota
- Class: Gammaproteobacteria
- Order: Alteromonadales
- Family: Alteromonadaceae
- Genus: Alteromonas
- Species: A. stellipolaris

Binomial name
- Alteromonas stellipolaris Van Trappen et al., 2004

Species of bacterium

Alteromonas stellipolaris is a marine bacterium.
