= Alteromonas simiduii =

Scientific classification
- Domain: Bacteria
- Kingdom: Pseudomonadati
- Phylum: Pseudomonadota
- Class: Gammaproteobacteria
- Order: Alteromonadales
- Family: Alteromonadaceae
- Genus: Alteromonas
- Species: A. simiduii

Binomial name
- Alteromonas simiduii Chiu et al., 2007

Species of bacterium

Alteromonas simiduii is a marine bacterium.
