= Alteromonas genovensis =

Scientific classification
- Domain: Bacteria
- Kingdom: Pseudomonadati
- Phylum: Pseudomonadota
- Class: Gammaproteobacteria
- Order: Alteromonadales
- Family: Alteromonadaceae
- Genus: Alteromonas
- Species: A. genovensis

Binomial name
- Alteromonas genovensis Vandecandelaere et al., 2008

Species of bacterium

Alteromonas genovensis is a marine bacterium.
