= Alteromonas litorea =

Scientific classification
- Domain: Bacteria
- Kingdom: Pseudomonadati
- Phylum: Pseudomonadota
- Class: Gammaproteobacteria
- Order: Alteromonadales
- Family: Alteromonadaceae
- Genus: Alteromonas
- Species: A. litorea

Binomial name
- Alteromonas litorea Yoon et al., 2004

Synonyms
- Alteromonas litorea Yoon et al., 2004

Species of bacterium

Alteromonas litorea is a marine bacterium.
