= Alteromonas macleodii =

Scientific classification
- Domain: Bacteria
- Kingdom: Pseudomonadati
- Phylum: Pseudomonadota
- Class: Gammaproteobacteria
- Order: Alteromonadales
- Family: Alteromonadaceae
- Genus: Alteromonas
- Species: A. macleodii

Binomial name
- Alteromonas macleodii Baumann et al., 1972

Synonyms
- Alteromonas macleodii Baumann et al., 1972

Species of bacterium

Alteromonas macleodii is a species of widespread marine bacterium found in surface waters across temperate and tropical regions. First discovered in a survey of aerobic bacteria in 1972, A. macleodii has since been placed within the phylum Pseudomonadota and is recognised as a prominent component of surface waters between 0 and 50 metres. Alteromonas macleodii has a single circular DNA chromosome of 4.6 million base pairs. Variable regions in the genome of A. macleodii confer functional diversity to closely related strains and facilitate different lifestyles and strategies. Certain A. macleodii strains are currently being explored for their industrial uses, including in cosmetics, bioethanol production and rare earth mining.

== Morphology ==
The species Alteromonas macleodii refers to an encapsulated gram-negative heterotrophic γ-proteobacterium. It is aerobic and motile, with a singular unsheathed polar flagellum. Isolates of A. macleodii are between 0.6 to 0.8 μm width and 1.4 to 2.0 μm length, and are neither luminescent nor pigmented. Alteromonas macleodii is able to grow on glucose-only solid medium, forming colonies up to 0.9 cm in diameter with irregular edges. As a result of phenotypic variability and differences in genomic content among strains, competitiveness in culture varies both between cultures of the same strain and between strains from different geographical areas and depths.

Bacteria classified as A. macleodii are r-strategists; large cells with high nucleic-acid content are commonly seen, with high dividing frequencies and carbon production rates. As a copiotroph, A. macleodii is able to use glucose as its sole carbon and energy source and blooms under high nutrient and sodium concentrations where it is able to outcompete other organisms. Low temperatures and low carbon availability generally impede growth.

== Distribution ==
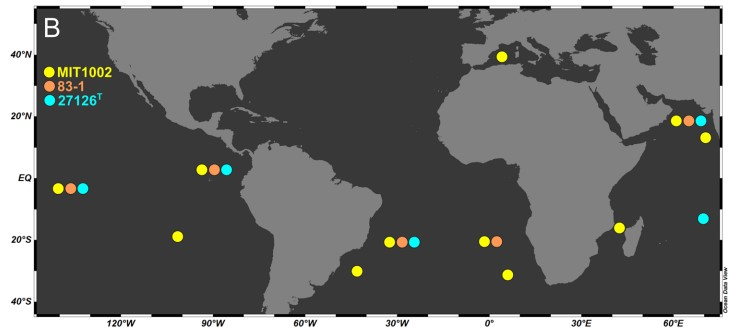
Location and distribution of Alteromonas macleodii strains MIT1002, 83-1 and 27126 in TARA Ocean metagenomes.

Alteromonas macleodii are ubiquitous in the global oceans, typically adhering to small organic particles in the upper 50 metres of the water column. They constitute a significant proportion of the bacterial abundance in the North Atlantic and Mediterranean at up to 9 and 23 percent of total particle-attached bacteria respectively, and are also present in the Northeast Pacific and subtropical Atlantic.

Initially, two ecotypes of Alteromonas macleodii were described, as niche differentiation had caused two distinct strains of the bacterium to occupy different water depth profiles. The "deep ecotype" is more suited to microaerophilic environments and it sinks rapidly into the deeper pelagic zones, relying on a different spectrum of carbon sources. Recently, the deep ecotype strains have been reclassified as Alteromonas mediterranea.

== Physiology ==
Physiological variation in Alteromonas macleodii leads to specific adaptive strategies in terms of carbon and iron metabolism, cellular communication, and nutrient acquisition. Some strains are specialised in their associations with prochlorococcus species through enhanced phenol degradation, while others have a unique capacity to metabolise sugars from specific algae species. The production of homoserine, lactones and siderophores are also strain-specific, with different nutrient acquisition and cellular communication strategies between strains under different ecological conditions.

The physiology of Alteromonas macleodii can influence iron concentrations and recalcitrant dissolved organic matter (DOM) production in the oceans. These bacteria utilise unique Ton-B dependent transporters to acquire iron as well as carbon substrates. As a result, some strains of A. macleodii are able to more efficiently regulate the uptake of glucose, tryptophan, and tyrosine during growth. An ATPase-independent mechanism is involved in the transport of the siderophores which scavenge iron for the bacterium, iron which is then used by enzymes to facilitate carbon metabolism.

The physiological responses of A. macleodii depend on the type of amino acids taken up. D-amino acids such as D-alanine, D-serine and D-glutamic acid reduce metabolic activity, also inhibiting the production of exopolysaccharide (EPS). Exopolysaccharide production contributes to cell aggregation and the formation of biofilms in marine bacterial species. Paradoxically, the uptake of D-amino acids by A. macleodii impedes the production of EPS, but encourages the formation of biofilms by promoting other independent aggregation factors.

The extracellular membrane vesicles in A. macleodii play a crucial role in algae degradation and habitat colonisation. These vesicles contain hydrolytic enzymes such as lipases, proteases and nucleases. These enzymes are responsible for the degradation of cell walls and inner components of red algae such as Kappaphycus. Alteromonas macleodii is also very efficient at degrading alginate, expressing as many as five separate alginate lyases and outcompeting other bacterial groups when grown on this substrate.

== Ecology ==
The surface-dwelling A. macleodii is well-suited to the degradation of a variety sugars and amino acids. These bacteria are generally attached to small particles, but can also be free-living and are able to utilise a number of different substrates for growth. Alteromonas macleodii is a copiotroph flexible in its use of substrates, growing rapidly at high carbon and nutrient concentrations.

=== Interspecies interactions ===
Alteromonas macleodii is able to sustain Prochlorococcus cells undergoing chlorosis due to nutrient stress. During chlorosis, Prochlorococcus is unable to use its essential photosynthetic pigments, but is able to survive for an extended period of time in the presence of A. macleodii. The marine heterotroph has also been found associated with Trichodesmium, a filamentous cyanobacteria that fixes nitrogen in the oceans. Alteromonas macleodii might influence Trichodesmium metabolism, allowing for the catabolism of methanol and the detoxification of radical oxygen species.

=== Iron limitation ===
Under iron replete conditions, the rate of respiration in A. macleodii is significantly reduced. Iron metal is associated with several key processes for bacterial metabolism, such as the citric acid cycle, glycolysis, and oxidative phosphorylation, all of which are functionally limited when iron availability is not sufficient. The growth rate of A. macleodii is therefore reduced when iron is limited, although the growth rate of strains from coastal populations is reduced more so than those from mid-oceanic populations.

=== Copper stress ===
Increased exposure of bacteria to copper may occur in several ways, such as nutrient leaching, metals from ship hulls, or natural mineral deposits. Under conditions of increased copper concentrations, biofilm production of A. macleodii significantly increases as a defensive response to copper induced stress. These bacteria are able to colonise areas of very high copper concentration, giving them an advantage over other bacteria under these conditions.

=== Role in carbon cycle ===
As heterotrophic bacteria, A. macleodii consume dissolved organic carbon in seawater and are then consumed by higher trophic levels, acting as a gateway for carbon into ecosystems. While natural ecosystems consist of a variety of heterotrophs contributing to the carbon cycle, it has been found in laboratory settings that A. macleodii is capable of drawing down the complete pool of labile DOC present in coastal waters. This indicates that the relationship between A. macleodii and other bacteria in the microbial loop of coastal waters is one of functional redundancy: Alteromonas is capable of carbon cycling to the same extent as entire microbial communities.

Cell wall polysaccharides secreted by macroalga are degraded by microbes such as Alteromonas, and are a major source of carbon into marine ecosystems. Alteromonas macleodii exhibits two distinct strategies for carbon uptake, depending on the type of polysaccharide present in their habitat. When degrading the common polysaccharides laminarin, alginate, and pectin, A. macleodii releases different catabolites at different times to degrade the respective substrates. Laminarin is the first polysaccharide that is degraded, followed by alginate and pectin. This temporal variation in carbon utilisation is a result of a shift in transcriptional activity of CAZymes and polysaccharide utilisation gene fragments. The biphasic nature of these cellular adaptations indicates that A. macleodii's role in the drawdown of polysaccharide DOC is adaptable to changing community structures of macroalgal communities.

Alginate is a gel textured polysaccharide that is a common component of macroalgal cell walls, and is a nutrient and carbon source for many organisms. A. macleodii are a key components of the carbon cycle, in that they degrade alginate, increasing DOC drawdown in marine environments. Further, A. macleodii has been found to outcompete other species of bacteria in the degradation of alginate, indicating that A. macleodii plays a particularly relevant role in ecological carbon cycling. The degradation of algal polysaccharides and proteins is crucial for nutrient acquisition, and has the effect of preventing overgrowth of red algae.

== Genome ==
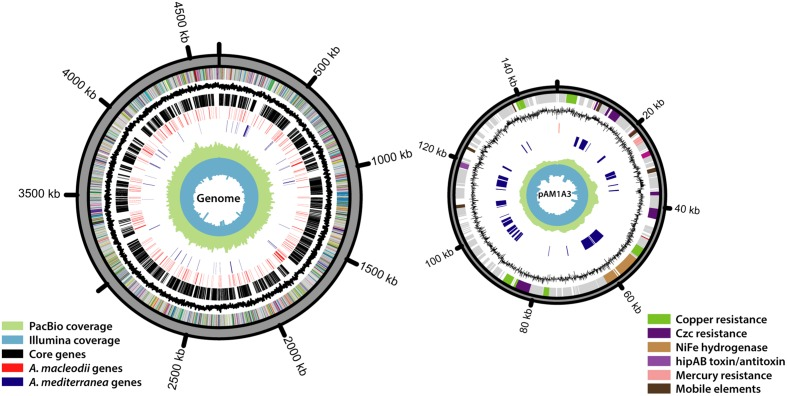
The genome of Alteromonas strain HOT1A3 and its plasmid pAM1A3. Distinct A. mediterranea genes in blue, distinct A. macleodii genes in red, core genes of Alteromonas in black. The grey colour indicates genes not of functional interest.

The genomes of A. macleodii strains have distinct genomic content associated with different lifestyles and geographical locations. Small differences in overall nucleotide identity between strains can be functionally substantial; many important functional genes are found on genomic islands (GIs) exchanged between populations. Strains associated with surface waters such as ATCC 21726 have a single circular genome of about 4.6 million base pairs. Alteromonas macleodii has an estimated 4400 total genes with about 47% GC content. Its pangenome is vast, there is significant variation in functional genetic content between strains from different geographical regions. Additionally, closely related strains vary in functional genes found on genomic islands.

Alteromonas macleodii is globally distributed in the surface ocean at 0-50m depth, these strains are highly variable functionally despite sharing 97-99% nucleotide identity. Functional differences between surface strains are conferred by horizontally transferred genes, and are reflective of the variable conditions of surface waters. Surface strains of A. macleodii also have a higher number of genes associated with utilising different sugar and amino acid substrates as well as transcriptional regulators for plasticity in changing conditions. This plasticity is associated with the ability of Alteromonas to grow rapidly and take advantage of increases in available organic matter. Key genes associated with siderophore production and degradation of algal substrates are also transferred horizontally.

=== Genomic Islands ===
Content of genomic islands differs greatly between strains, especially those coding for polysaccharides that present on the flagellum and the outer surface of the cell, with possible roles in phage avoidance. Some strains have acquired heavy-metal tolerance and other important functional genes from GIs found in A. mediterranea, GIs containing important functional genes are exchanged between different populations of A. macleodii, increasing functional flexibility. Plasmids carried by some A. macleodii strains that enhance heavy-metal tolerance are found in genomic islands in other members of the Alteromonadales.

=== Heavy metal tolerance ===
Alteromonas macleodii is an early coloniser of copper-based antifouling paint on ships, where it forms biofilms. While there is variability between strains, A. macleodii generally has genomic features which confer very high tolerance to copper and other heavy metals. Strains with high copper tolerance all had at least one genomic island with metal tolerance genes, including several copies of the key cytoplasmic detoxifying factor copA and its transcriptional regulator merR. These factors give A. macleodii the ability to grow at metal levels lethal to most other marine species. Megaplasmids found in particularly metal-tolerant strains contain multiple copies of metal detoxification systems with orthologs in Escherichia and Pseudomonas.

Copper prevents bacterial growth due to its intrinsic antimicrobial properties, minimising the formation of biofilms. However, some A. macleodii strains are still able to induce growth of biofilms under elevated copper concentrations. These strains possess an alteration in the diguanylate cyclase (DGC) genes, which control the expression of biofilms in A. macleodii. Specific subsets of the DGC genes are highly expressed in some strains, enhancing biofilm development by amplifying the transduction of signals that promote biofilm formation. This process changes the structure of the microbial community, affecting both the microenvironment and biogeochemical cycling.

=== Relationship to Alteromonas medditerranea ===
A closely related set of strains previously considered "deep-ecotype" of A. macleodii have since been reclassified under A. mediterranea as they share only 81% overall sequence identity. There are 3200 genes shared between A. macleodii and A. mediterranea, with 1200-1600 unique to each. The "deep-ecotype" A. mediterranea strains contain more dioxygenases for degrading recalcitrant DOM such as urea, molecular chaperones for protein folding at lower temperatures and hydrogenases associated with heavy-metal tolerance, located with other tolerance genes on a single GI. These sets of genes are not exclusive to A. mediterranea, as they are exchanged between different populations of Alteromonas species along with other sets of functional genes such as enzymes for sugar and amino acid degradation, allowing for niche specialisation.

=== Phage infecting A. macleodii ===
Genes such as phase integrases and the CRISPR cluster found in some A. macleodii strains are likely involved in phage interactions. Some genomic islands encode specific surface receptors recognised by phages, increasing the susceptibility to phage infections. Some components of GIs are lysogenic or defective phages; one of these widespread GIs encodes virus-derived mismatch repair and RNA chaperone genes. For example, the O-chain lipopolysaccharides of the bacteria may associate with the receptor binding proteins present on the Alterophage R8W, allowing attachment and entry. Just over a dozen Alterophages infecting A. macleodii have been characterised to date, including members of the Podoviridae and Autographiviridae.

== Industrial uses ==
=== Reduction of potassium tellurite to elemental tellurium ===
Elemental tellurium is an extremely rare metalloid contained in the Earth's crust with desirable optic and electronic properties. However, current industrial production of tellurium requires the usage of substances harmful to both humans and the environment. As a result, extraction of metalloids by biotechnological applications involving bacterial biosynthesis of nanoparticles from various uncommon and rare metals are increasingly being studied.

Tellurium has toxic effects on bacteria through an unknown mechanism. Alteromonas macleodii contains a plasmid that houses genes allowing for resistance to multiple metals, and has the ability to reduce potassium tellurite into elemental tellurium. The nanoparticles of the reduced tellurium are diffused into the cytoplasm, or into the extracellular space in the form of both electron-dense globules and metalloid crystals. This makes A. macleodii a candidate for facilitating the extraction of tellurium with reduced reliance on toxic chemicals.

=== Extraction of biomolecules from red seaweeds ===
Membrane vesicles containing κ-carrageenase are produced by A. macleodii, which allows it to degrade carrageenan, a major polysaccharide found in the cell walls of red seaweeds. The κ-carrageenase containing vesicles can be exploited for bioethanol production since they convert carbohydrate-rich biomass to sugars. Biomolecules present in the red seaweeds, such as vitamins and carotenoids, are also extracted for commercial use in tandem with the bioethanol production process.

=== EPS deepsane usage in cosmetics ===
Alteromonas macleodii secretes "deepsane", an exopolysaccharide now used in cosmetics. Studied properties of "deepsane" include high viscosity possibly due to the interaction between acetate and pyruvate, making it an alternative to other viscous polymers currently used in food and cosmetics. As of 2012, "deepsane" is also commercially available in the cosmetics industry and is referred to as Abyssine®, used in skincare products to reduce skin irritation from sunburns.

=== Additional future prospects in water treatments ===
Alteromonas macleodii, when grown in glucose-supplemented media, secreted an unexpectedly high-molecular-weight polymer that changed carbohydrate composition. The polymer was found to be rich in uronic acids and therefore expected to have a heavy-metal-binding ability that could be used and applied in the treatment of wastewater.
