= Pseudoalteromonas luteoviolacea =

Scientific classification
- Domain: Bacteria
- Kingdom: Pseudomonadati
- Phylum: Pseudomonadota
- Class: Gammaproteobacteria
- Order: Alteromonadales
- Family: Pseudoalteromonadaceae
- Genus: Pseudoalteromonas
- Species: P. luteoviolacea

Binomial name
- Pseudoalteromonas luteoviolacea (Gauthier 1982); Gauthier et al., 1995

Synonyms
- Alteromonas luteoviolacea Alteromonas luteo-violaceus

Species of bacterium

Pseudoalteromonas luteoviolacea is a marine bacterium which was isolated from seawater near Nice.

== History ==
Pseudoalteromonas luteoviolacea was originally isolated in 1976 and named Alteromonas luteo-violaceus. However, this name was amended to Alteromonas luteoviolacea in 1982 to comply with standard bacterial naming. In 1995, several species of Alteromonas, including A. luteoviolacea, were reclassified under the newly created genus Pseudoalteromonas based on ribosomal RNA comparisons.
