= Marine prokaryotes =

Marine bacteria and marine archaea

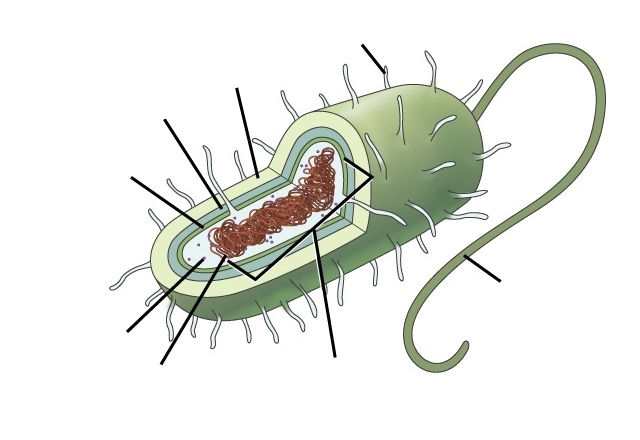
Parts of a prokaryote

Diagram above contains clickable links

Cellular life forms can be divided into prokaryotes and eukaryotes. Prokaryotes are bacteria or archaea, and the diagram shows some (clickable) parts shared by both. But bacteria and archaea also have fundamental differences, as indicated by their placement in different domains.

Marine prokaryotes are marine bacteria and marine archaea. They are defined by their habitat as prokaryotes that live in marine environments, that is, in the saltwater of seas or oceans or the brackish water of coastal estuaries. All cellular life forms can be divided into prokaryotes and eukaryotes. Eukaryotes are organisms whose cells have a nucleus enclosed within membranes, whereas prokaryotes are the organisms that do not have a nucleus enclosed within a membrane. The three-domain system of classifying life adds another division: the prokaryotes are divided into two domains of life, the microscopic bacteria and the microscopic archaea, while everything else, the eukaryotes, become the third domain.

Prokaryotes play important roles in ecosystems as decomposers recycling nutrients. Some prokaryotes are pathogenic, causing disease and even death in plants and animals. Marine prokaryotes are responsible for significant levels of the photosynthesis that occurs in the ocean, as well as significant cycling of carbon and other nutrients.

Prokaryotes live throughout the biosphere. In 2018 it was estimated the total biomass of all prokaryotes on the planet was equivalent to 77 billion tonnes of carbon (77 Gt C). This is made up of 7 Gt C for archaea and 70 Gt C for bacteria. These figures can be contrasted with the estimate for the total biomass for animals on the planet, which is about 2 Gt C, and the total biomass of humans, which is 0.06 Gt C. This means archaea collectively have over 100 times the collective biomass of humans, and bacteria over 1000 times.

There is no clear evidence of life on Earth during the first 600 million years of its existence. When life did arrive, it was dominated for 3,200 million years by the marine prokaryotes. More complex life, in the form of crown eukaryotes, did not appear until the Cambrian explosion a mere 500 million years ago.

== Evolution ==
Timeline of prokaryote domination
| ← / Earth (−4540); ← / earliest undisputed life; ← / earliest oxygen; ← / atmospheric oxygen; ← / oxygen crisis; ← / sexual reproduction; ← / earliest plants; ← / earliest animals; ← / Ediacara biota; ← / Cambrian explosion; ← / tetrapods; ← / earliest apes |
(million years ago) This timeline contains clickable links Marine prokaryotes have been the dominant life form for most of Earth's history, perhaps because water protected them from ionizing radiation

The Earth is about 4.54 billion years old. The earliest undisputed evidence of life on Earth dates from at least 3.5 billion years ago, during the Eoarchean Era after a geological crust started to solidify following the earlier molten Hadean Eon. Microbial mat fossils have been found in 3.48 billion-year-old sandstone in Western Australia.

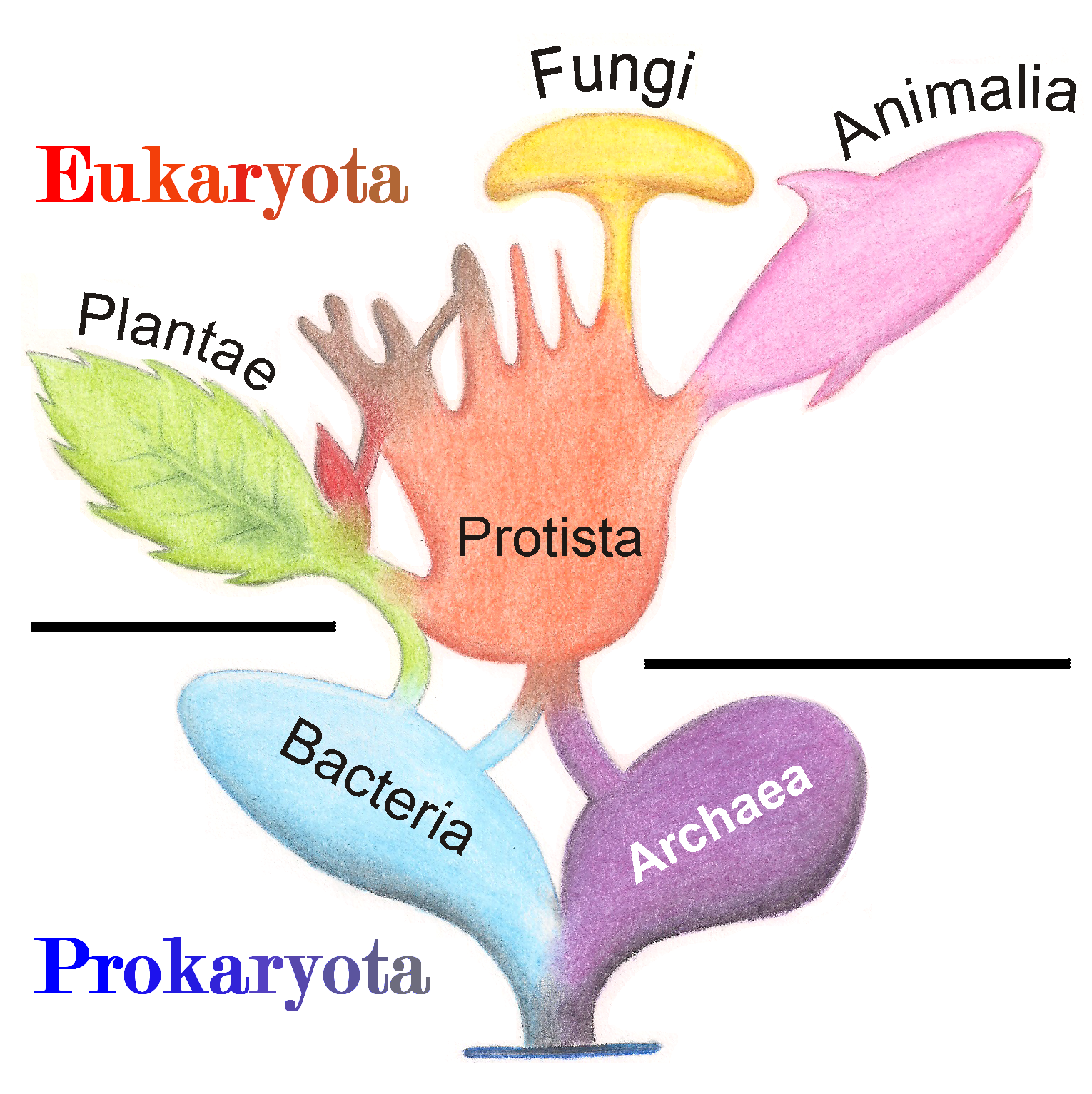
Phylogenetic and symbiogenetic tree of living organisms, showing a view of the origins of eukaryotes and prokaryotes

Past species have also left records of their evolutionary history. Fossils, along with the comparative anatomy of present-day organisms, constitute the morphological, or anatomical, record. By comparing the anatomies of both modern and extinct species, paleontologists can infer the lineages of those species. However, this approach is most successful for organisms that have hard body parts, such as shells, bones or teeth. Further, as prokaryotes such as bacteria and archaea share a limited set of common morphologies, their fossils do not provide information on their ancestry.

Prokaryotes inhabited the Earth from approximately 3–4 billion years ago. No obvious changes in morphology or cellular organisation occurred in these organisms over the next few billion years. The eukaryotic cells emerged between 1.6 and 2.7 billion years ago. The next major change in cell structure came when bacteria were engulfed by eukaryotic cells, in a cooperative association called endosymbiosis. The engulfed bacteria and the host cell then underwent coevolution, with the bacteria evolving into either mitochondria or hydrogenosomes. Another engulfment of cyanobacterial-like organisms led to the formation of chloroplasts in algae and plants.

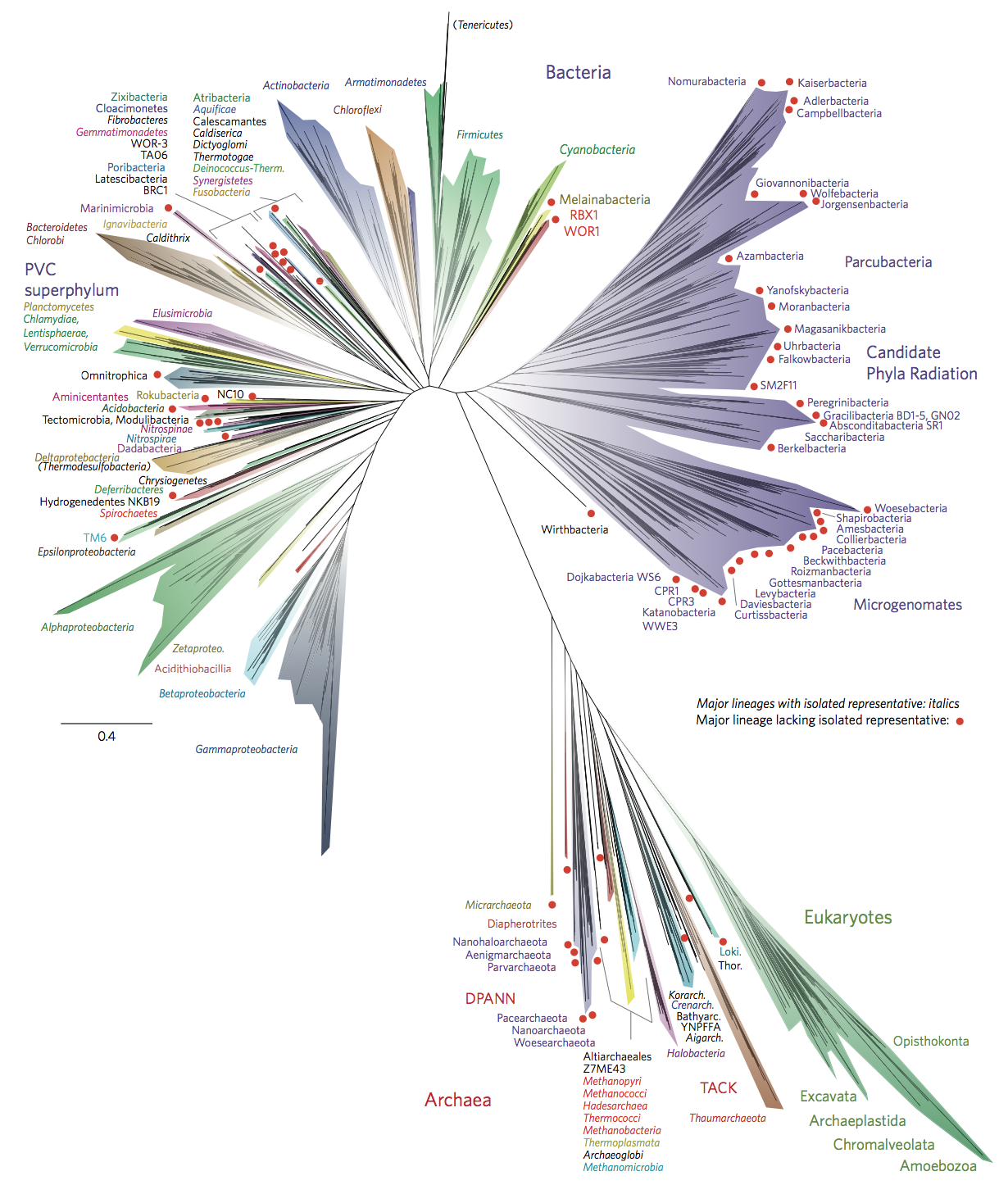
A 2016 metagenomic representation of the tree of life using ribosomal protein sequences. The tree includes 92 named bacterial phyla, 26 archaeal phyla and five eukaryotic supergroups. Major lineages are assigned arbitrary colours and named in italics with well-characterized lineage names. Lineages lacking an isolated representative are highlighted with non-italicized names and red dots.

Eukaryote versus prokaryote

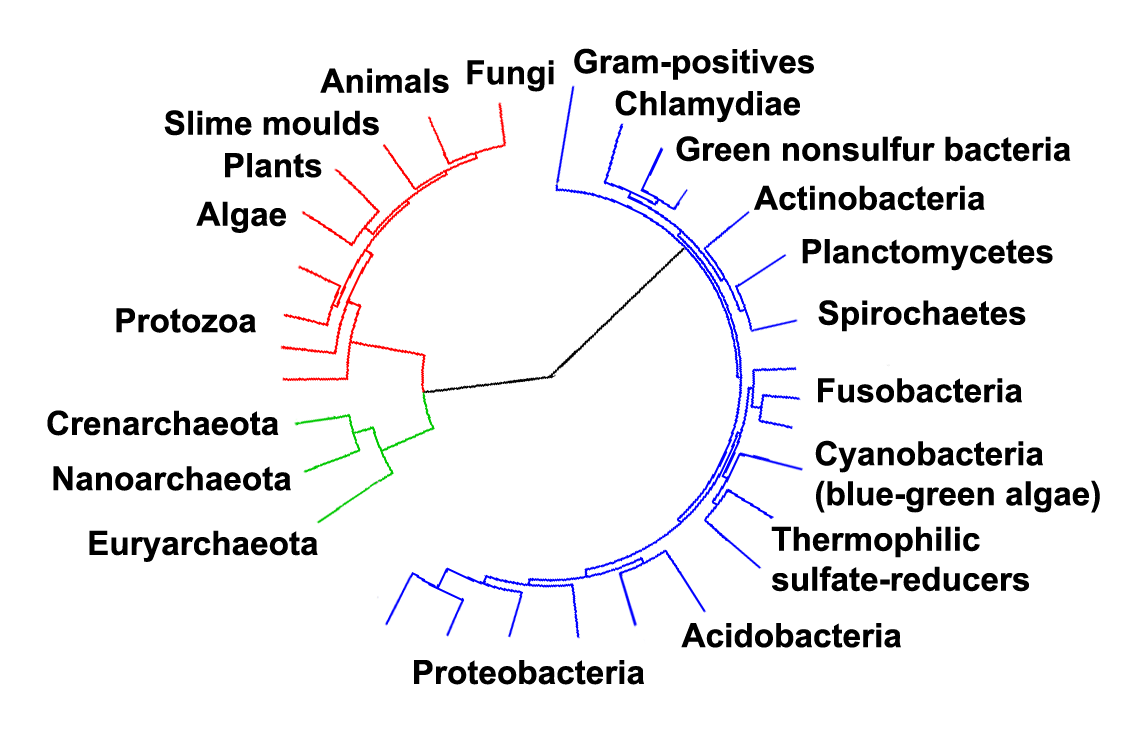
A view of the phylogenetic tree based on the three-domain system, showing the divergence of modern species from their common ancestor in the centre. The three domains are coloured, with bacteria blue, archaea green and eukaryotes red.

The history of life was that of the unicellular prokaryotes and eukaryotes until about 610 million years ago when multicellular organisms began to appear in the oceans in the Ediacaran period. The evolution of multicellularity occurred in multiple independent events, in organisms as diverse as sponges, brown algae, cyanobacteria, slime moulds and myxobacteria. In 2016 scientists reported that, about 800 million years ago, a minor genetic change in a single molecule called GK-PID may have allowed organisms to go from a single cell organism to one of many cells.

Soon after the emergence of these first multicellular organisms, a remarkable amount of biological diversity appeared over a span of about 10 million years, in an event called the Cambrian explosion. Here, the majority of types of modern animals appeared in the fossil record, as well as unique lineages that subsequently became extinct. Various triggers for the Cambrian explosion have been proposed, including the accumulation of oxygen in the atmosphere from photosynthesis.

== Background ==
The range of sizes shown by prokaryotes (bacteria and archaea) and viruses relative to those of other organisms and biomolecules

The words prokaryote and eukaryote come from the Greek where pro means "before", eu means "well" or "true", and karyon means "nut", "kernel" or "nucleus". So etymologically, prokaryote means "before nucleus" and eukaryote means "true nucleus".

The division of life forms between prokaryotes and eukaryotes was firmly established by the microbiologists Roger Stanier and C. B. van Niel in their 1962 paper, The concept of a bacterium. One reason for this classification was so what was then often called blue-green algae (now called cyanobacteria) would cease to be classified as plants but grouped with bacteria.

In 1990 Carl Woese et al. introduced the three-domain system. The prokaryotes were split into two domains, the archaea and the bacteria, while the eukaryotes become a domain in their own right. The key difference from earlier classifications is the splitting of archaea from bacteria.

microbial mats

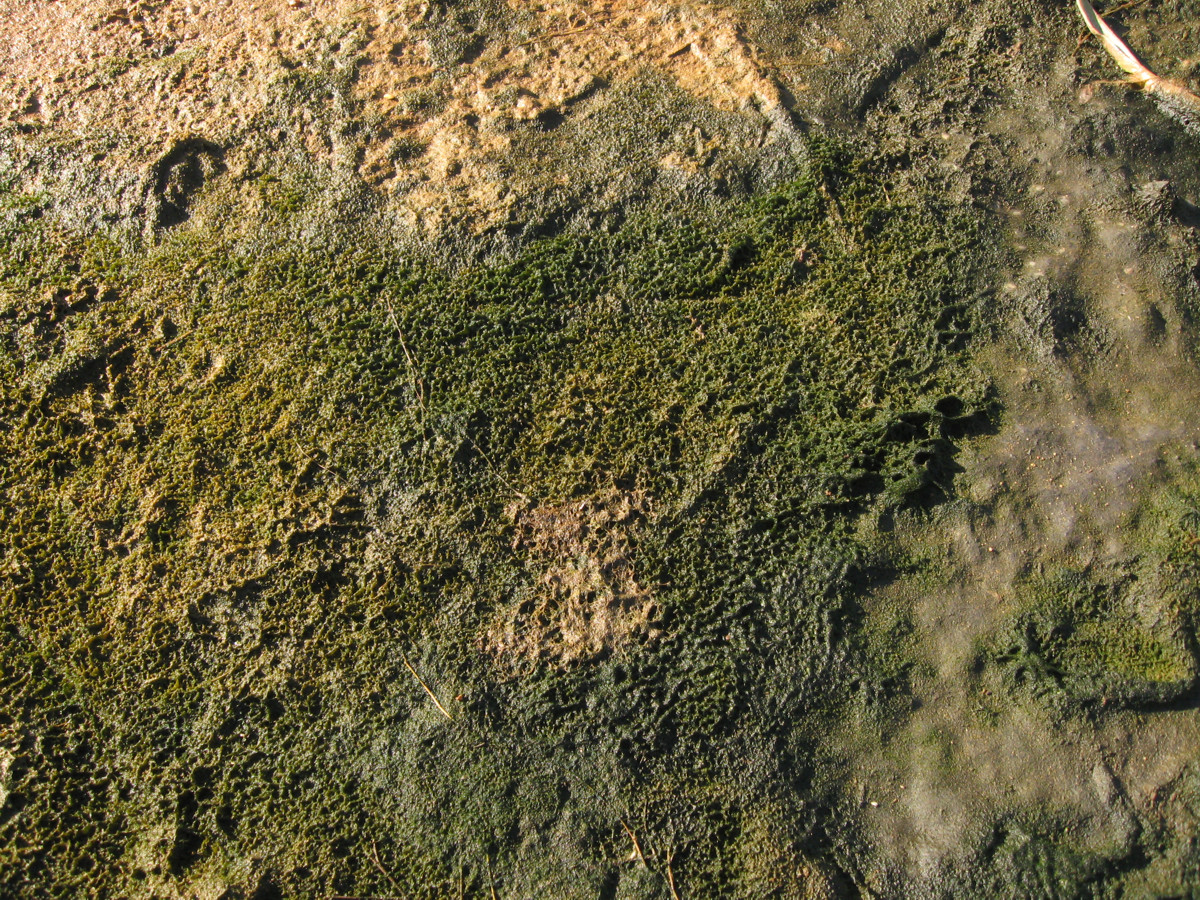
Microbial mats are the earliest form of life on Earth for which there is good fossil evidence. The image shows a cyanobacterial-algal mat.

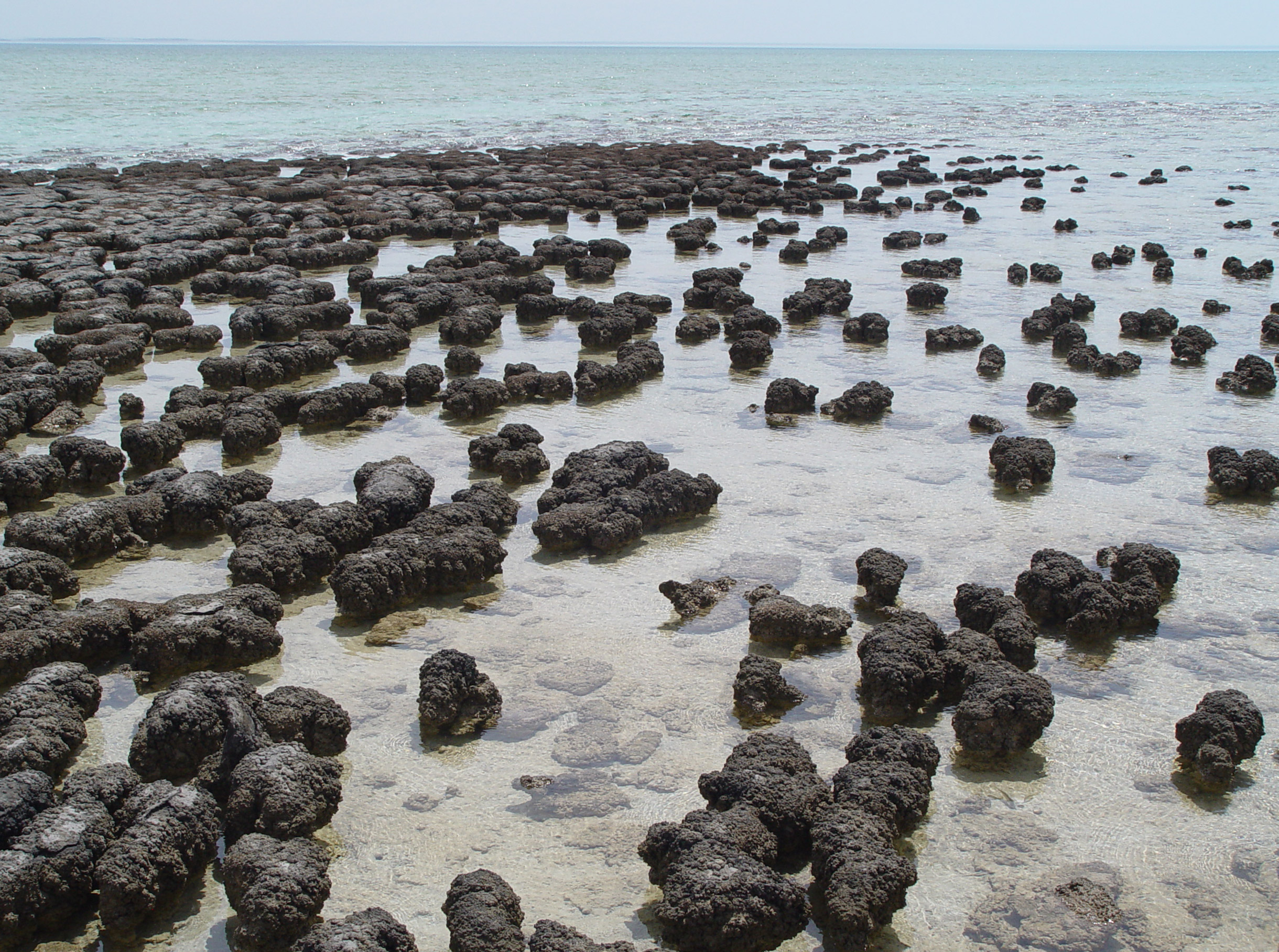
Stromatolites are formed from microbial mats as microbes slowly move upwards to avoid being smothered by sediment.

External videos
- How bad was the Great Oxidation Event?

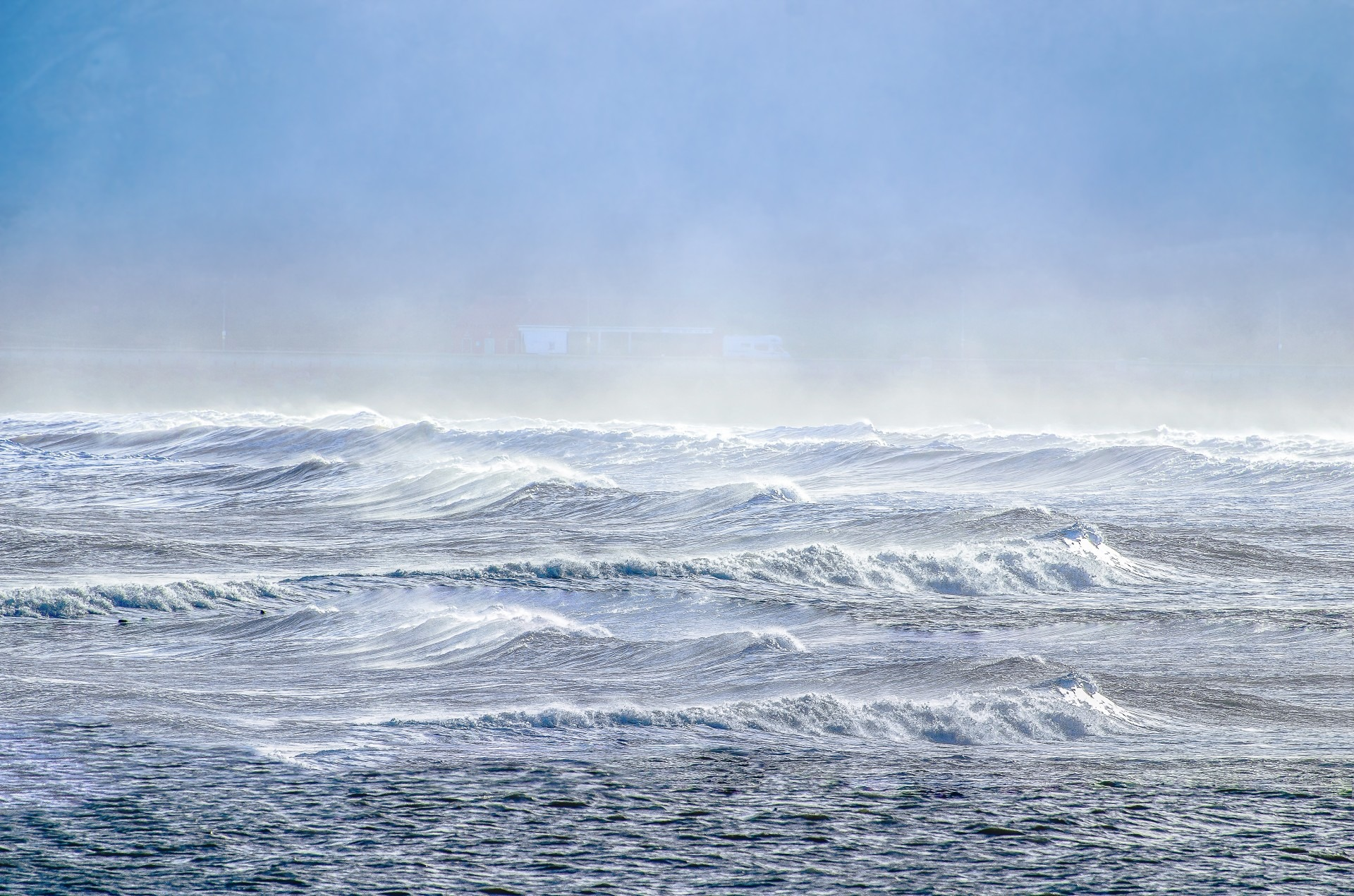
Sea spray containing marine microorganisms, including prokaryotes, can be swept high into the atmosphere where they become aeroplankton, and can travel the globe before falling back to earth.

The earliest evidence for life on earth comes from biogenic carbon signatures and stromatolite fossils discovered in 3.7 billion-year-old rocks. In 2015, possible "remains of biotic life" were found in 4.1 billion-year-old rocks. In 2017 putative evidence of possibly the oldest forms of life on Earth was reported in the form of fossilized microorganisms discovered in hydrothermal vent precipitates that may have lived as early as 4.28 billion years ago, not long after the oceans formed 4.4 billion years ago, and not long after the formation of the Earth 4.54 billion years ago.

Microbial mats of coexisting bacteria and archaea were the dominant form of life in the early Archean Eon and many of the major steps in early evolution are thought to have taken place in this environment. The evolution of photosynthesis around 3.5 Ga resulted in a buildup of its waste product oxygen in the atmosphere, leading to the great oxygenation event beginning around 2.4 Ga.

The earliest evidence of eukaryotes dates from 1.85 Ga, and while they may have been present earlier, their diversification accelerated when they started using oxygen in their metabolism. Later, around 1.7 Ga, multicellular organisms began to appear, with differentiated cells performing specialised functions.

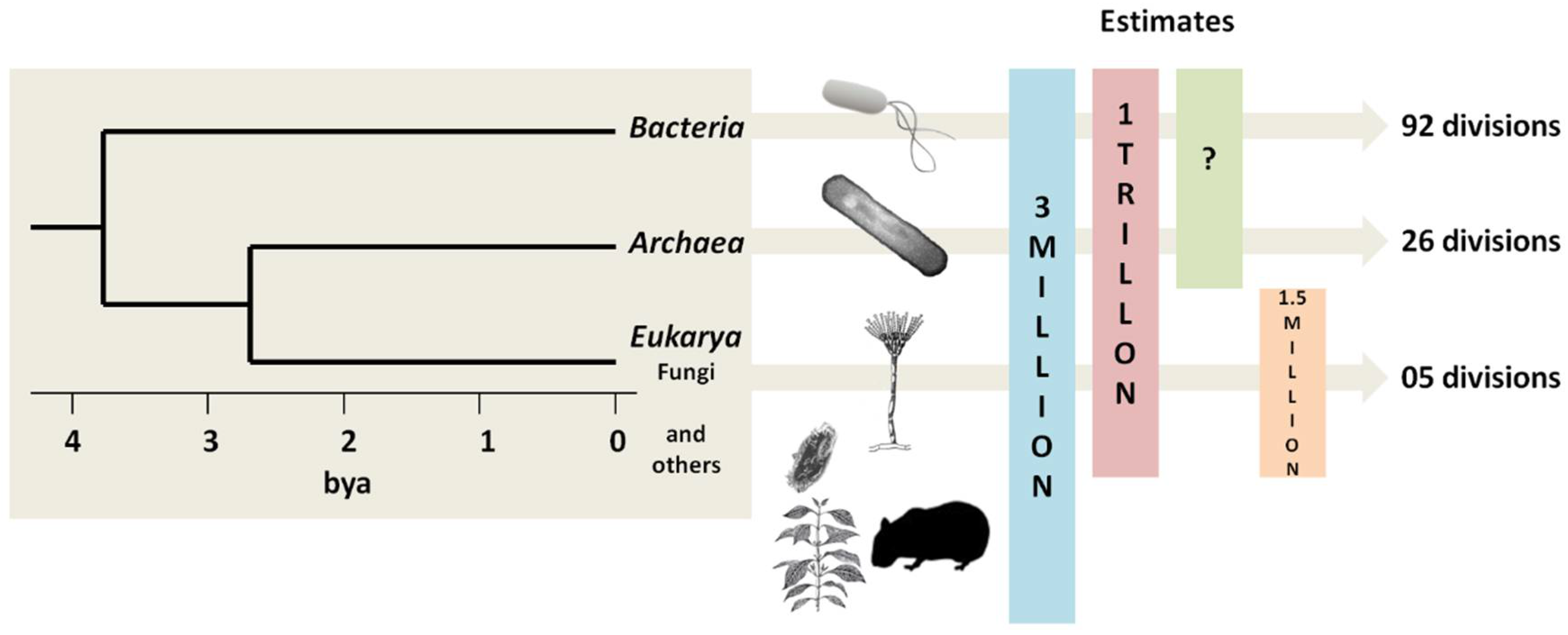
Estimates of microbial species counts in the three domains of life Bacteria are the oldest and most biodiverse group, followed by Archaea and Fungi (the most recent groups). In 1998, before awareness of the extent of microbial life had gotten underway, Robert M. May estimated there were 3 million species of living organisms on the planet. But in 2016, Locey and Lennon estimated the number of microorganism species could be as high as 1 trillion.

A stream of airborne microorganisms, including prokaryotes, circles the planet above weather systems but below commercial air lanes. Some peripatetic microorganisms are swept up from terrestrial dust storms, but most originate from marine microorganisms in sea spray. In 2018, scientists reported that hundreds of millions of viruses and tens of millions of bacteria are deposited daily on every square meter around the planet.

Microscopic life undersea is diverse and still poorly understood, such as for the role of viruses in marine ecosystems. Most marine viruses are bacteriophages, which are harmless to plants and animals, but are essential to the regulation of saltwater and freshwater ecosystems. They infect and destroy bacteria and archaea in aquatic microbial communities, and are the most important mechanism of recycling carbon in the marine environment. The organic molecules released from the dead bacterial cells stimulate fresh bacterial and algal growth. Viral activity may also contribute to the biological pump, the process whereby carbon is sequestered in the deep ocean.

== Marine bacteria ==
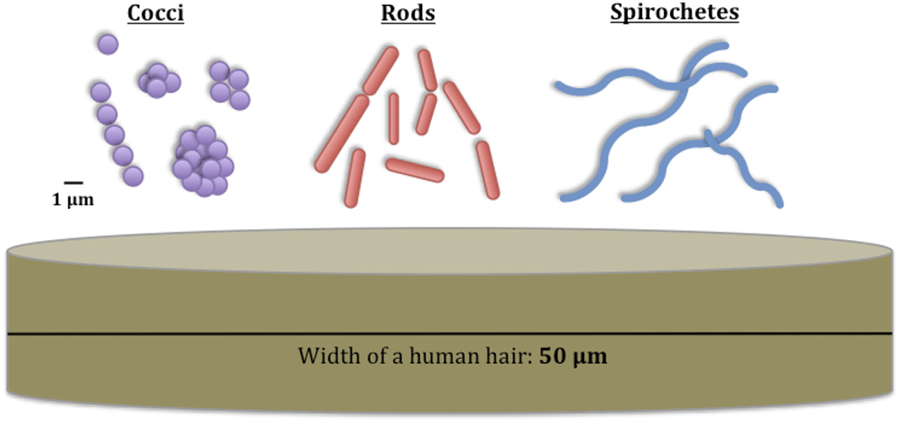
Different bacteria shapes (cocci, rods and spirochetes) and their sizes compared with the width of a human hair. A few bacteria are comma-shaped (vibrio). Archaea have similar shapes, though the archaeon Haloquadratum is flat and square. The unit μm is a measurement of length, the micrometer, equal to 1/1,000 of a millimeter

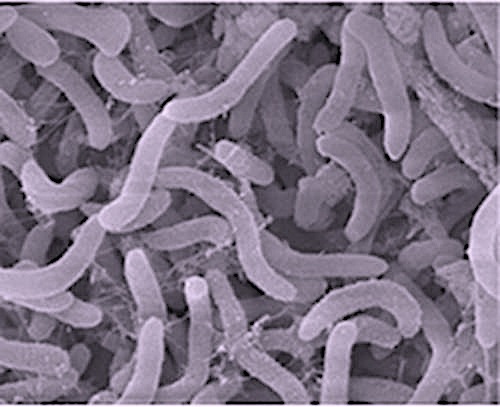
Pelagibacter ubique of the SAR11 clade is the most abundant bacteria in the ocean and plays a major role in the global carbon cycle.

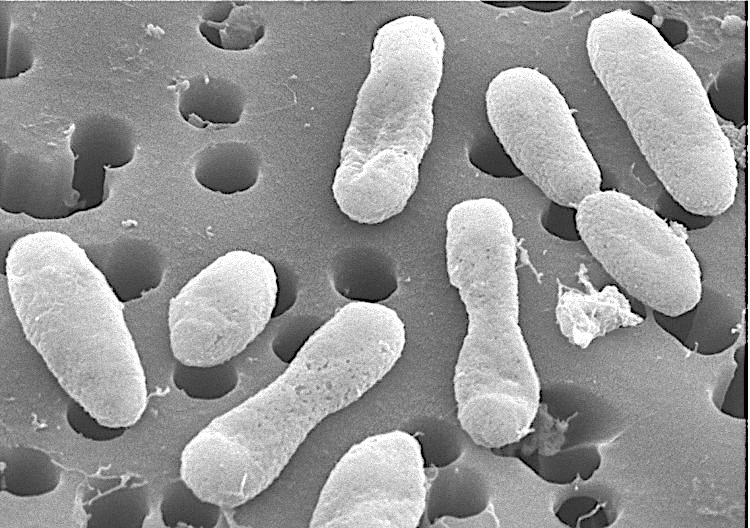
Scanning electron micrograph of a strain of Roseobacter, a widespread and important genus of marine bacteria. For scale, the membrane pore size is 0.2 μm in diameter.

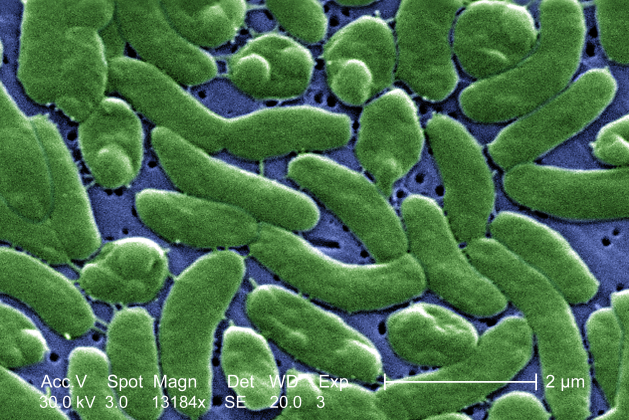
Vibrio vulnificus, a virulent bacterium found in estuaries and along coastal areas

Bacteria constitute a large domain of prokaryotic microorganisms. Typically a few micrometres in length, bacteria have a number of shapes, ranging from spheres to rods and spirals. Bacteria were among the first life forms to appear on Earth, and are present in most of its habitats. Bacteria inhabit soil, water, acidic hot springs, radioactive waste, and the deep portions of Earth's crust. Bacteria also live in symbiotic and parasitic relationships with plants and animals.

Once regarded as plants constituting the class Schizomycetes, bacteria are now classified as prokaryotes. Unlike cells of animals and other eukaryotes, bacterial cells do not contain a nucleus and rarely harbour membrane-bound organelles. Although the term bacteria traditionally included all prokaryotes, the scientific classification changed after the discovery in the 1990s that prokaryotes consist of two very different groups of organisms that evolved from an ancient common ancestor. These evolutionary domains are called Bacteria and Archaea.

The ancestors of modern bacteria were unicellular microorganisms that were the first forms of life to appear on Earth, about 4 billion years ago. For about 3 billion years, most organisms were microscopic, and bacteria and archaea were the dominant forms of life. Although bacterial fossils exist, such as stromatolites, their lack of distinctive morphology prevents them from being used to examine the history of bacterial evolution, or to date the time of origin of a particular bacterial species. However, gene sequences can be used to reconstruct the bacterial phylogeny, and these studies indicate that bacteria diverged first from the archaeal/eukaryotic lineage. Bacteria were also involved in the second great evolutionary divergence, that of the archaea and eukaryotes. Here, eukaryotes resulted from the entering of ancient bacteria into endosymbiotic associations with the ancestors of eukaryotic cells, which were themselves possibly related to the Archaea. This involved the engulfment by proto-eukaryotic cells of alphaproteobacterial symbionts to form either mitochondria or hydrogenosomes, which are still found in all known Eukarya. Later on, some eukaryotes that already contained mitochondria also engulfed cyanobacterial-like organisms. This led to the formation of chloroplasts in algae and plants. There are also some algae that originated from even later endosymbiotic events. Here, eukaryotes engulfed a eukaryotic algae that developed into a "second-generation" plastid. This is known as secondary endosymbiosis.

Bacteria grow to a fixed size and then reproduce through binary fission, a form of asexual reproduction. Under optimal conditions, bacteria can grow and divide extremely rapidly, and bacterial populations can double as quickly as every 9.8 minutes.

Pelagibacter ubique and its relatives may be the most abundant microorganisms in the ocean, and it has been claimed that they are possibly the most abundant bacteria in the world. They make up about 25% of all microbial plankton cells, and in the summer they may account for approximately half the cells present in temperate ocean surface water. The total abundance of P. ubique and relatives is estimated to be about 2 × 10^{28} microbes. However, it was reported in Nature in February 2013 that the bacteriophage HTVC010P, which attacks P. ubique, has been discovered and is probably the most common organism on the planet.

Roseobacter is also one of the most abundant and versatile microorganisms in the ocean. They are diversified across different types of marine habitats, from coastal to open oceans and from sea ice to sea floor, and make up about 25% of coastal marine bacteria. Members of the Roseobacter genus play important roles in marine biogeochemical cycles and climate change, processing a significant portion of the total carbon in the marine environment. They form symbiotic relationships which allow them to degrade aromatic compounds and uptake trace metals. They are widely used in aquaculture and quorum sensing. During algal blooms, 20–30% of the prokaryotic community are Roseobacter.

The largest known bacterium, the marine Thiomargarita namibiensis, can be visible to the naked eye and sometimes attains 0.75 mm (750 μm).

Marine bacteria

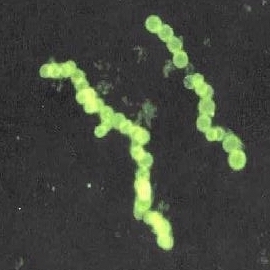
The marine Thiomargarita namibiensis, largest known bacterium

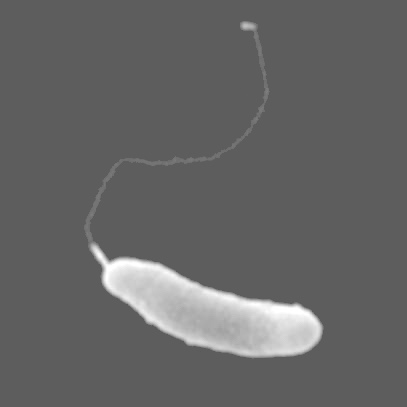
The bacterium Marinomonas arctica grows inside Arctic sea ice at subzero temperatures.

=== Cyanobacteria ===
Cyanobacteria

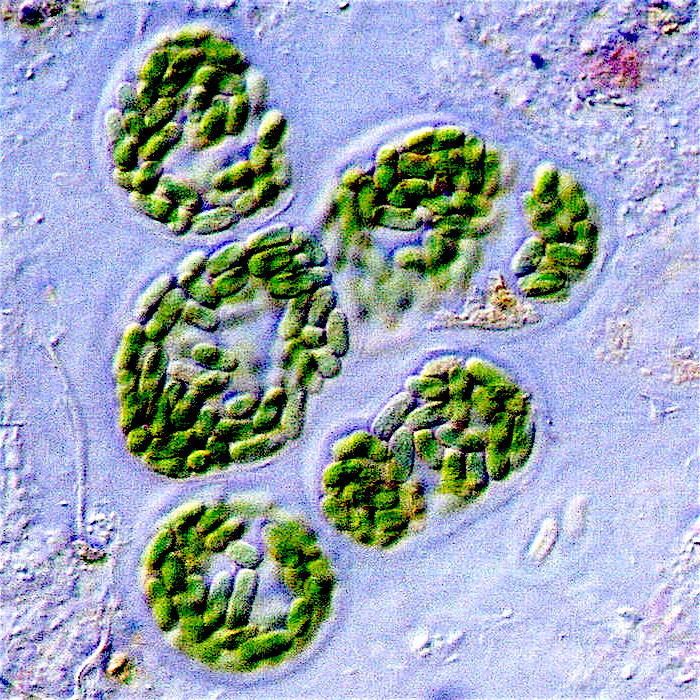
Cyanobacteria from a microbial mat. Cyanobacteria were the first organisms to release oxygen via photosynthesis.

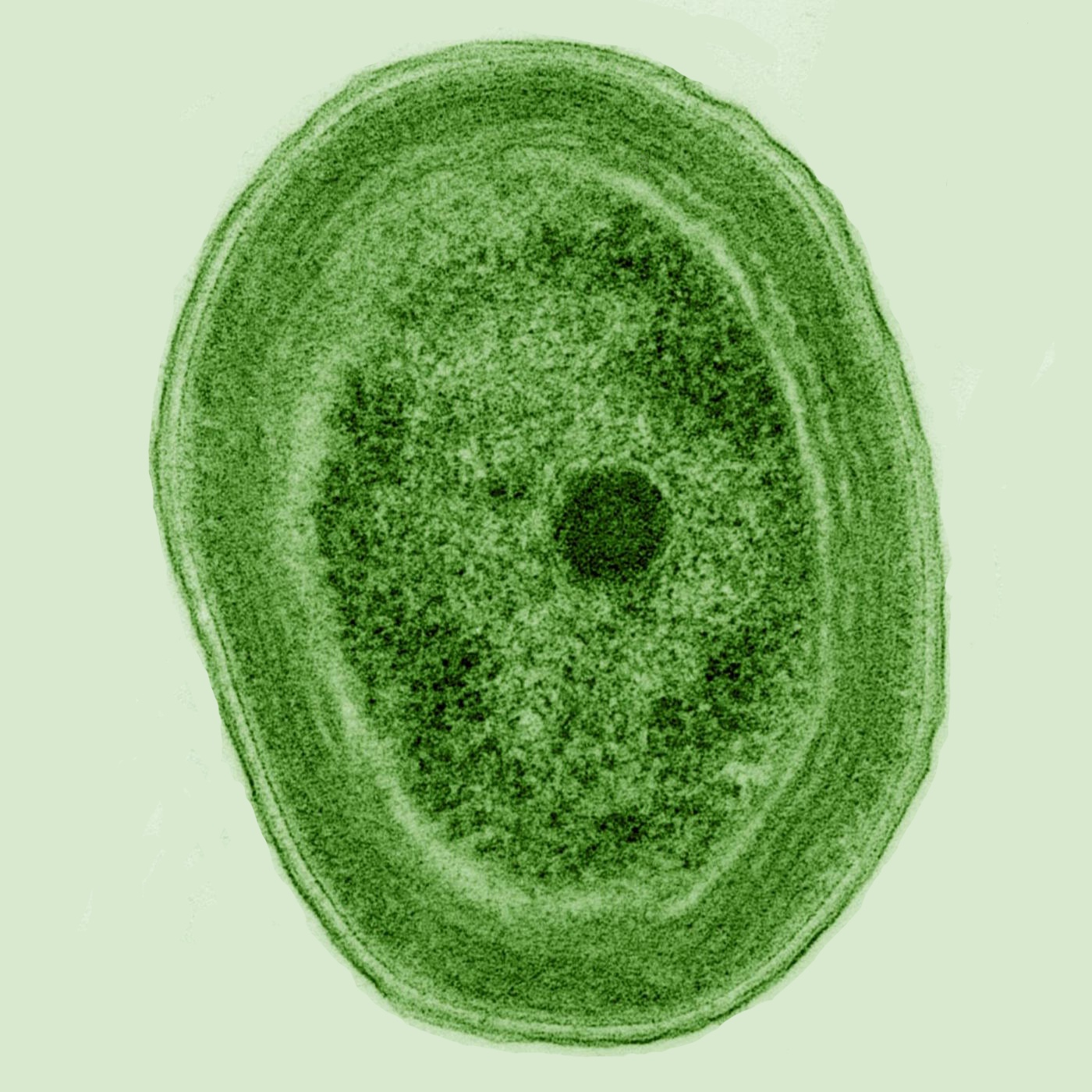
The tiny cyanobacterium Prochlorococcus is a major contributor to atmospheric oxygen.

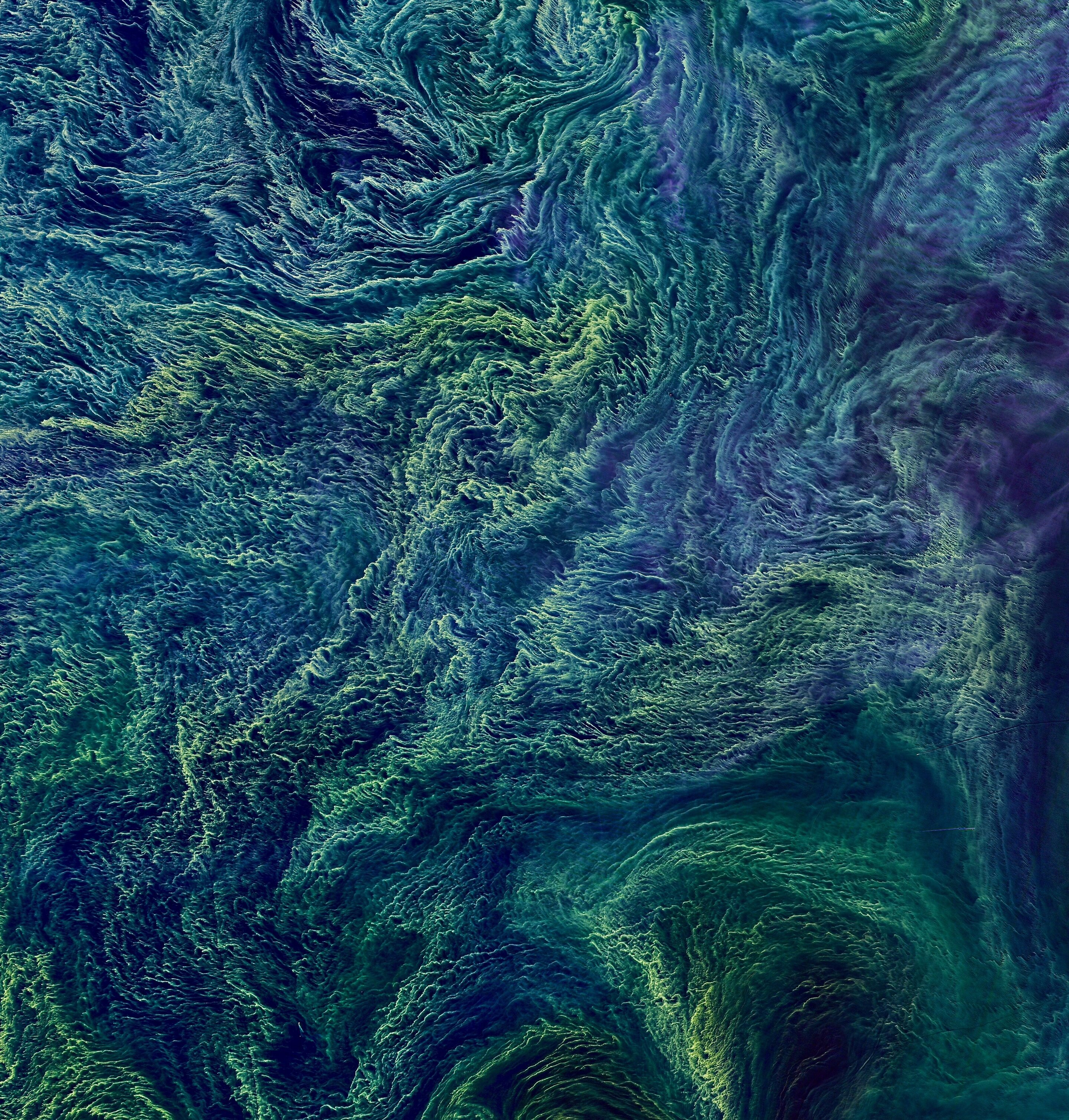
NASA image of a large bloom of Nodularia cyanobacteria swirling in the Baltic Sea

Cyanobacteria were the first organisms to evolve an ability to turn sunlight into chemical energy. They form a phylum (division) of bacteria which range from unicellular to filamentous and include colonial species. They are found almost everywhere on earth: in damp soil, in both freshwater and marine environments, and even on Antarctic rocks. In particular, some species occur as drifting cells floating in the ocean, and as such were amongst the first of the phytoplankton.

The first primary producers that used photosynthesis were oceanic cyanobacteria about 2.3 billion years ago. The release of molecular oxygen by cyanobacteria as a by-product of photosynthesis induced global changes in the Earth's environment. Because oxygen was toxic to most life on Earth at the time, this led to the near-extinction of oxygen-intolerant organisms, a dramatic change which redirected the evolution of the major animal and plant species.

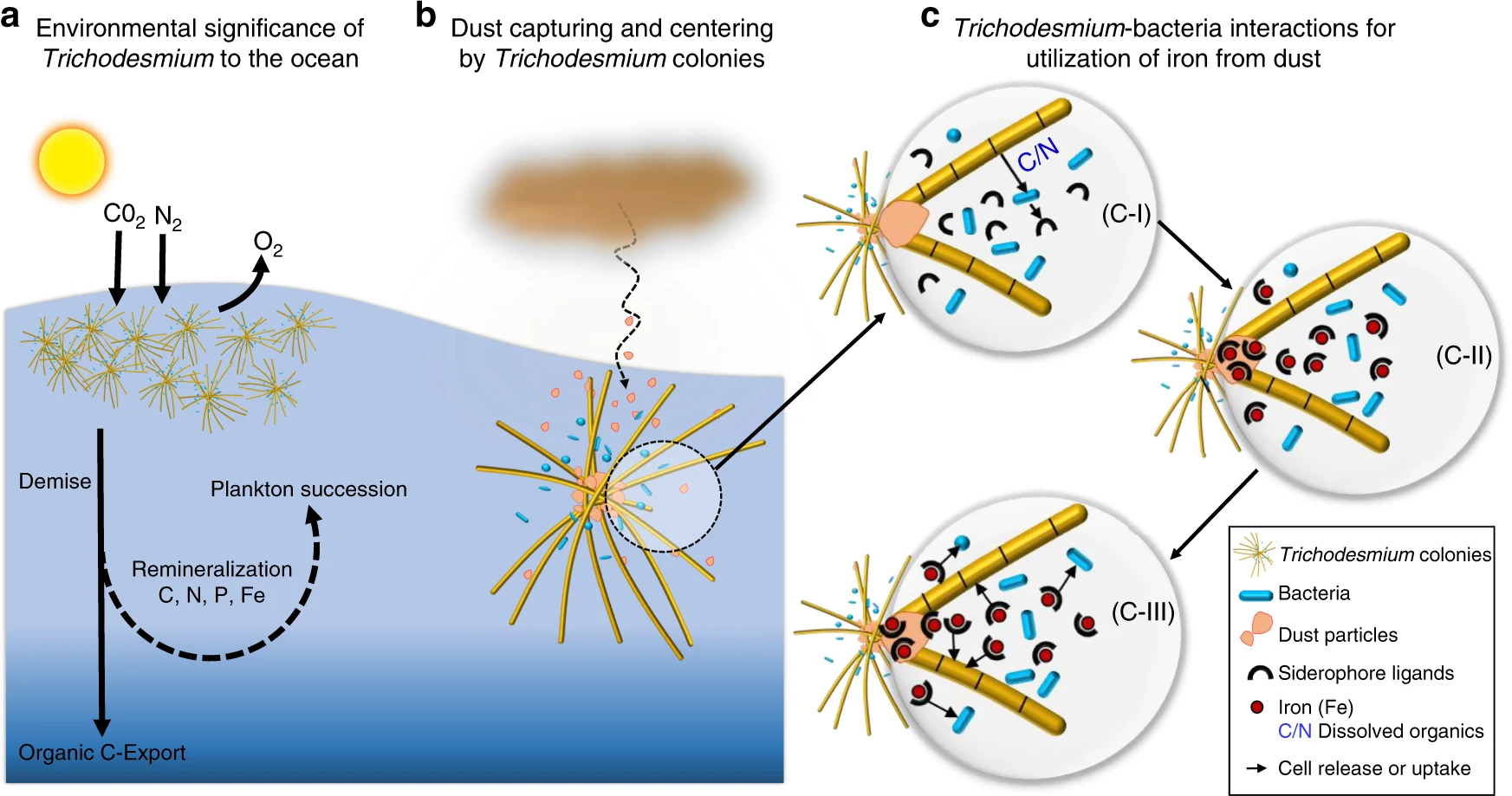
Colonies of marine cyanobacteria Trichodesmium interact with bacteria to acquire iron from dust a. The N_{2}-fixing Trichodesmium spp., which commonly occurs in tropical and sub-tropical waters, is of large environmental significance in fertilizing the ocean with important nutrients. b. Trichodesmium can establish massive blooms in nutrient poor ocean regions with high dust deposition, partly due to their unique ability to capture dust, center it, and subsequently dissolve it. c. Proposed dust-bound Fe acquisition pathway: Bacteria residing within the colonies produce siderophores (c-I) that react with the dust particles in the colony core and generate dissolved Fe (c-II). This dissolved Fe, complexed by siderophores, is then acquired by both Trichodesmium and its resident bacteria (c-III), resulting in a mutual benefit to both partners of the consortium.

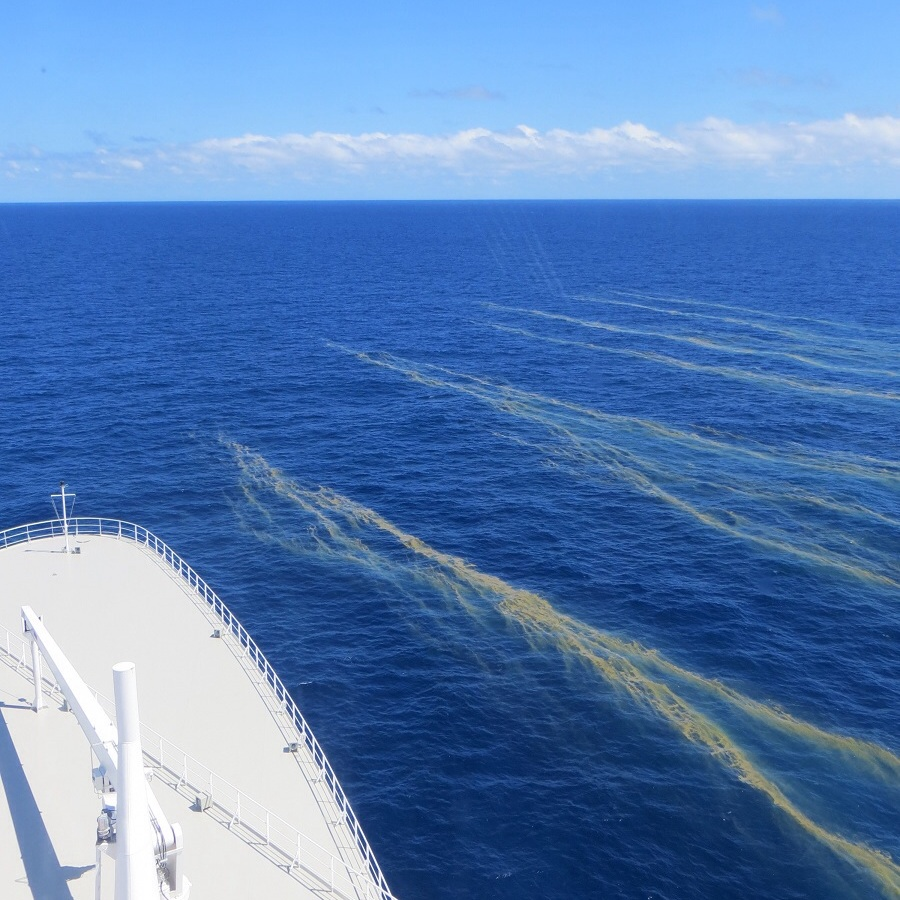
Bloom of the filamentous cyanobacteria Trichodesmium

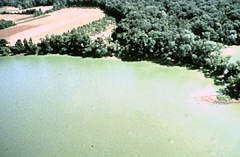
Cyanobacteria blooms can contain lethal cyanotoxins.
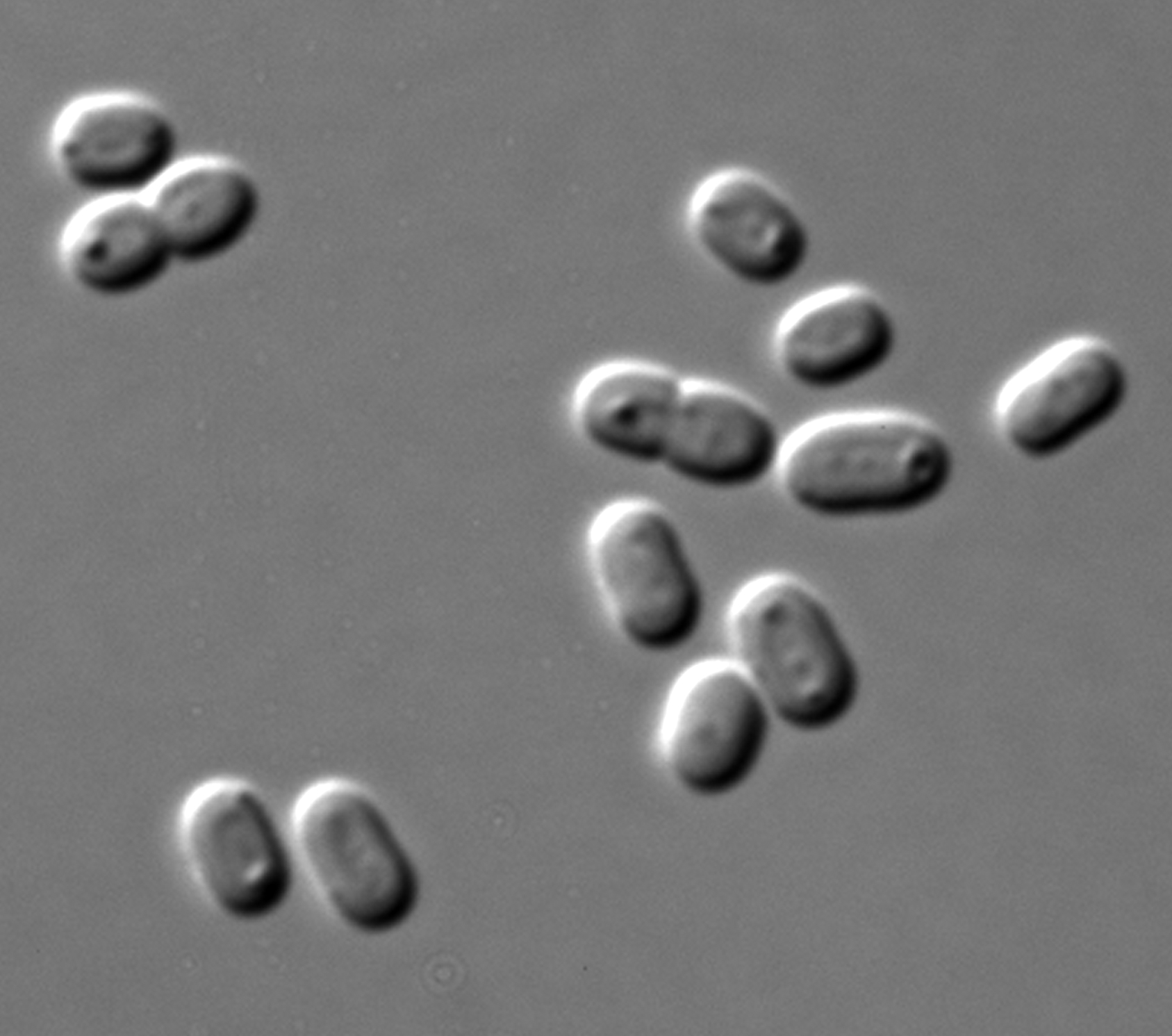
Synechococcus, a widespread marine cyanobacterium

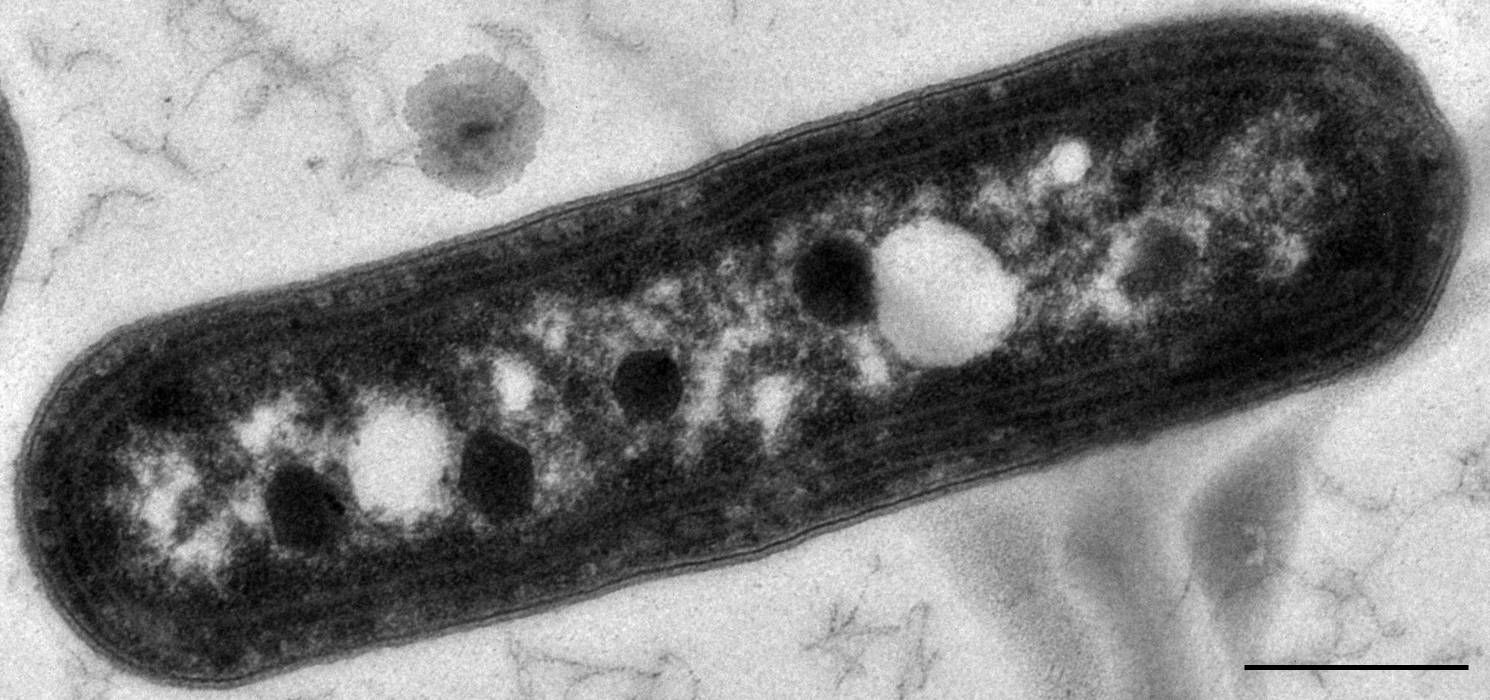
Carboxysomes appearing as polyhedral dark structures within a species of Synechococcus

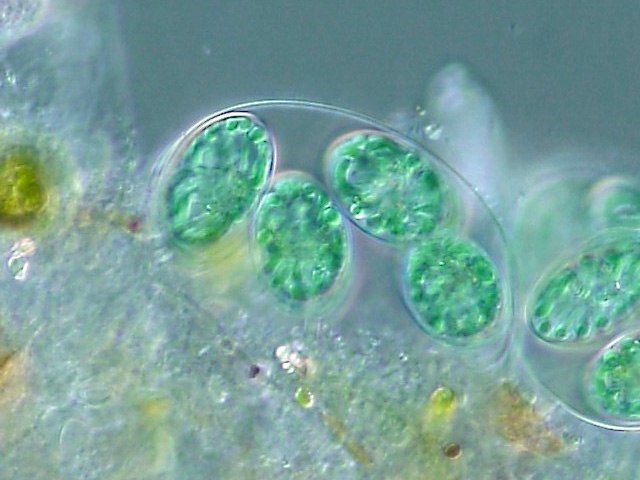
The chloroplasts of glaucophytes have a peptidoglycan layer, evidence suggesting their endosymbiotic origin from cyanobacteria.

The small (0.6 μm) marine cyanobacterium Prochlorococcus, discovered in 1986, is a major component of the base of the ocean food chain, accounting for some of the photosynthesis of the open ocean and produces an estimated 20% of the oxygen in the Earth's atmosphere. It is a plentiful genus, with a single millilitre of surface seawater potentially containing 100,000 cells or more.

Originally, biologists classified cyanobacteria as an algae, and referred to it as "blue-green algae". The more recent view is that cyanobacteria are bacteria, and hence are not even in the same Kingdom as algae. Most authorities exclude all prokaryotes, and hence cyanobacteria from the definition of algae.

External videos
- How cyanobacteria took over the world

=== Other bacteria ===
Other marine bacteria, apart from cyanobacteria, are ubiquitous or can play important roles in the ocean. These include the opportunistic copiotroph, Alteromonas macleodii.

=== Genetic Engineering of Marine Bacteria ===
Genetic engineering, or modification, is an important tool that allows research scientists to alter an organism’s DNA. This can be done via substitution, addition, or deletion of genetic material. By manipulating an organism’s genetic material, researchers have changed the medical and agricultural fields. Medicine has shifted to a more personalized focus by finding treatment options for an individual based on their genetic makeup. The agricultural field has been able to grow crops that are more resistant to the effects of climate change to improve food security. Genetic engineering has been more limited in the oceanographic field, but the impacts could be just as important. Genetic engineering has the potential to resolve ocean health threats from humans and climate change by reducing biodiversity losses and increasing disease resistance. The current state of genetic engineering tools are designed for non-marine organisms. These tools typically use E. coli as a pathway to insert foreign DNA into a target organism. However, researchers see either low transformation efficiencies or no transfer ability at all into marine bacteria. This means that either a very small amount of foreign DNA was taken up by the target marine bacteria or that none was taken up at all, respectively. These low efficiencies could result from the use of conventional hosts that are only distantly related to marine organisms as well as poor culture ability of marine bacterial strains.

Genetic modification in the environment can happen via transduction, natural competency, or by conjugation. In the marine environment, research on transduction has been limited and often focused on a specific species rather than more generalized methods that could be used ocean-wide with various species. Natural competency has been reported for marine bacteria, but only for a small subset of species. Cyanobacteria has been used to study why organisms may utilize natural competency. There are two main hypotheses for why bacteria take up external DNA, the “DNA-for-food” hypothesis and the “DNA-for-diversity” hypothesis. The first hypothesis suggests DNA is taken up by bacteria as a nutrient and the second hypothesis suggests that there is a benefit of taking up external DNA and acquiring new traits. Natural competence is a relatively simple and effective way to genetically modify organisms, however, understanding the mechanisms causing an organism to make use of natural competence is not well understood and needs further study. Additionally, it requires a large amount of DNA, natural competent cells, and is time consuming. Currently, conjugation may have the most applicable pathway for marine bacteria. Conjugation is a process that requires cell to cell contact for DNA transfer and typically uses plasmids to transfer genes of interest. Once inside an organism, a plasmid will continue to replicate and make copies of the gene of interest. Researchers have seen some success using shuttle plasmids, which aid replication and uptake of genetic material in unrelated species because they have two origin of replication sites, in marine bacteria.

There is limited research in the field of genetic engineering in the marine environment. The diversity of marine bacteria makes it hard to find genetic tools that will work with a vast array of marine organisms. Therefore, most studies exploring genetic modification of marine bacteria have been limited to a small number of species. However, development of efficient genetic tools for marine organisms could produce novel biotechnology products.

== Marine archaea ==
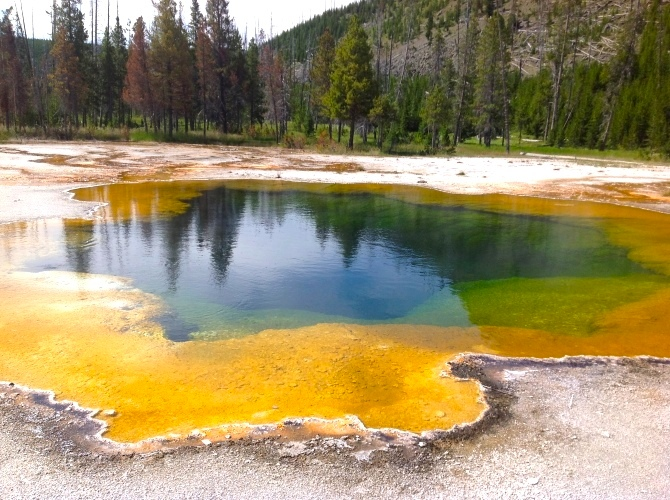
Archaea were initially viewed as extremophiles living in harsh environments, such as the yellow archaea pictured here in a hot spring, but they have since been found in a much broader range of habitats.

The archaea (Greek for ancient) constitute a domain and kingdom of single-celled microorganisms. These microbes are prokaryotes, meaning they have no cell nucleus or any other membrane-bound organelles in their cells.

Archaea were initially classified as bacteria, but this classification is outdated. Archaeal cells have unique properties separating them from the other two domains of life, Bacteria and Eukaryota. The Archaea are further divided into multiple recognized phyla. Classification is difficult because the majority have not been isolated in the laboratory and have only been detected by analysis of their nucleic acids in samples from their environment.

Bacteria and archaea are generally similar in size and shape, although a few archaea have very strange shapes, such as the flat and square-shaped cells of Haloquadratum walsbyi. Despite this morphological similarity to bacteria, archaea possess genes and several metabolic pathways that are more closely related to those of eukaryotes, notably the enzymes involved in transcription and translation. Other aspects of archaeal biochemistry are unique, such as their reliance on ether lipids in their cell membranes, such as archaeols. Archaea use more energy sources than eukaryotes: these range from organic compounds, such as sugars, to ammonia, metal ions or even hydrogen gas. Salt-tolerant archaea (the Haloarchaea) use sunlight as an energy source, and other species of archaea fix carbon; however, unlike plants and cyanobacteria, no known species of archaea does both. Archaea reproduce asexually by binary fission, fragmentation, or budding; unlike bacteria and eukaryotes, no known species forms spores.

Archaea are particularly numerous in the oceans, and the archaea in plankton may be one of the most abundant groups of organisms on the planet. Archaea are a major part of Earth's life and may play roles in both the carbon cycle and the nitrogen cycle. Thermoproteota (also called Crenarchaeota or eocytes) are a phylum of archaea thought to be very abundant in marine environments and one of the main contributors to the fixation of carbon.

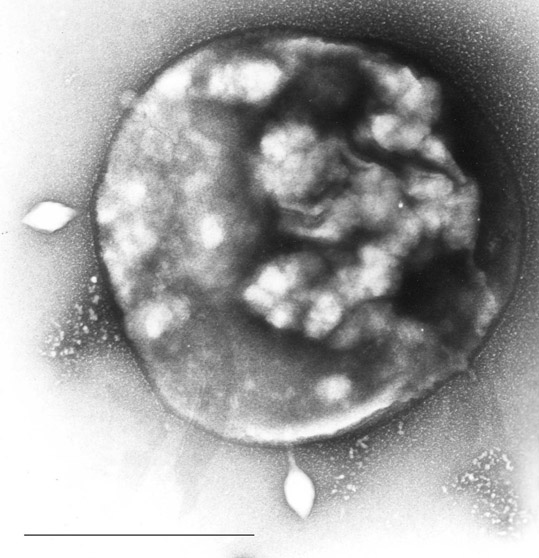
Eocytes may be the most abundant of marine archaea

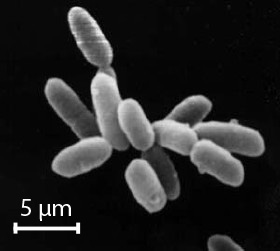
Halobacteria, found in water near saturated with salt, are now recognised as archaea.

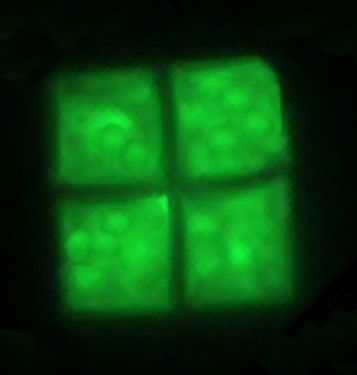
Flat, square-shaped cells of the archaea Haloquadratum walsbyi

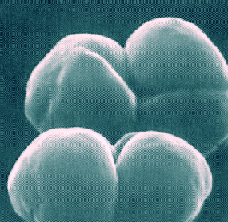
Methanosarcina barkeri, a marine archaea that produces methane

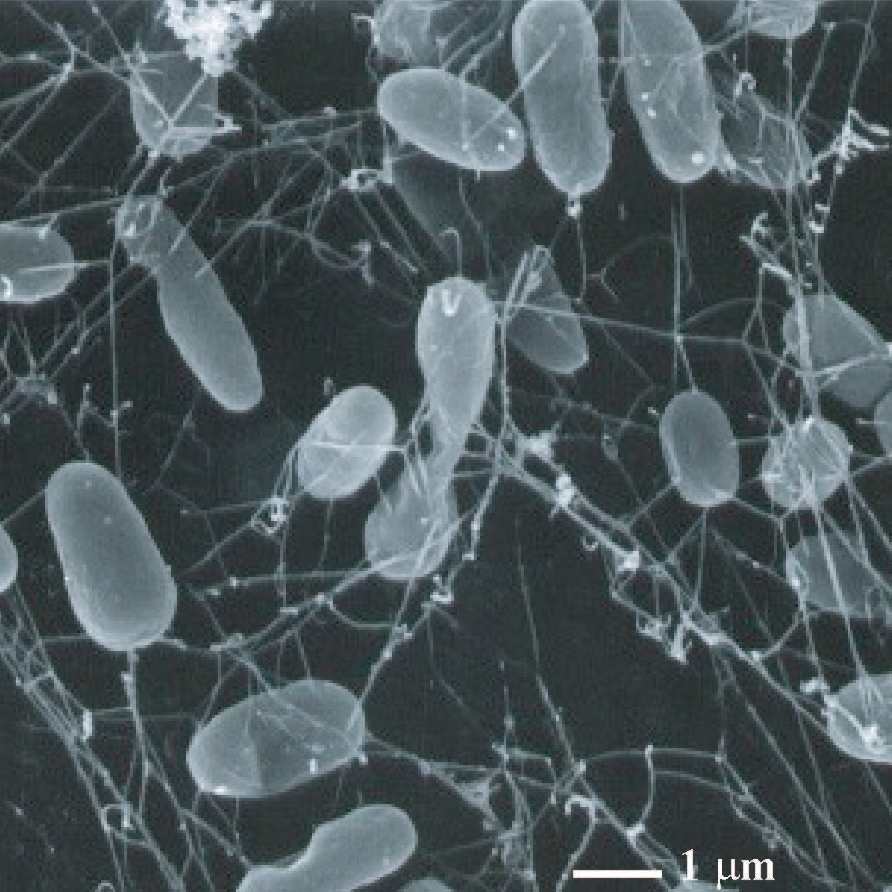
Thermophiles, such as Pyrolobus fumarii, survive well over 100 °C (212 °F).

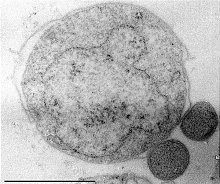
Two Nanoarchaeum equitans cells with its larger host Ignicoccus

Nanoarchaeum equitans is a species of marine archaea discovered in 2002 in a hydrothermal vent. It is a thermophile that grows in temperatures at about 80 °C (176 °F). Nanoarchaeum appears to be an obligate symbiont on the archaeon Ignicoccus. It must stay in contact with the host organism to survive since Nanoarchaeum equitans cannot synthesize lipids but obtains them from its host. Its cells are only 400 nm in diameter, making it one of the smallest known cellular organisms, and the smallest known archaeon.

Marine archaea have been classified as follows:

- Marine Group I (MG-I or MGI): marine Nitrososphaerota with subgroups Ia (aka I.a) up to Id
- Marine Group II (MG-II): marine Euryarchaeota, order Poseidoniales with subgroups IIa up to IId (IIa resembling Poseidoniaceae, IIb resembling Thalassarchaceae)
  Viruses parasiting MGII are classified as magroviruses
- Marine Group III (MG-III): also marine Euryarchaeota, Marine Benthic Group D
- Marine Group IV (MG-IV): also marine Euryarchaeota

== Trophic mode ==
Prokaryote metabolism is classified into nutritional groups on the basis of three major criteria: the source of energy, the electron donors used, and the source of carbon used for growth.

Nutritional types in bacterial metabolism
| Nutritional type | Source of energy | Source of carbon | Examples |
|---|---|---|---|
| Phototrophs | Sunlight | Organic compounds (photoheterotrophs) or carbon fixation (photoautotrophs) | "Cyanobacteria", Green sulfur bacteria, Chloroflexota, or Purple bacteria |
| Lithotrophs | Inorganic compounds | Organic compounds (lithoheterotrophs) or carbon fixation (lithoautotrophs) | Thermodesulfobacteriota, Hydrogenophilaceae, or Nitrospirota |
| Organotrophs | Organic compounds | Organic compounds (chemoheterotrophs) or carbon fixation (chemoautotrophs) | Bacillus, Clostridium or Enterobacteriaceae |

Marine prokaryotes have diversified greatly throughout their long existence. The metabolism of prokaryotes is far more varied than that of eukaryotes, leading to many highly distinct prokaryotic types. For example, in addition to using photosynthesis or organic compounds for energy, as eukaryotes do, marine prokaryotes may obtain energy from inorganic compounds such as hydrogen sulfide. This enables marine prokaryotes to thrive as extremophiles in harsh environments as cold as the ice surface of Antarctica, studied in cryobiology, as hot as undersea hydrothermal vents, or in high saline conditions as (halophiles). Some marine prokaryotes live symbiotically in or on the bodies of other marine organisms.

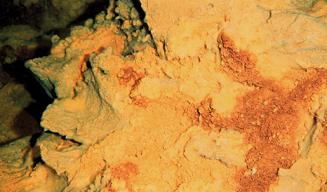
A microbial mat encrusted with iron oxide on the flank of a seamount can harbour microbial communities dominated by the iron-oxidizing Zetaproteobacteria

- Phototrophy is a particularly significant marker that should always play a primary role in bacterial classification.
- Aerobic anoxygenic phototrophic bacteria (AAPBs) are widely distributed marine plankton that may constitute over 10% of the open ocean microbial community. Marine AAPBs are classified in two marine (Erythrobacter and Roseobacter) genera. They can be particularly abundant in oligotrophic conditions where they were found to be 24% of the community. These are heterotrophic organisms that use light to produce energy, but are unable to utilise carbon dioxide as their primary carbon source. Most are obligately aerobic, meaning they require oxygen to grow. Current data suggests that marine bacteria have generation times of several days, whereas new evidence exists that shows AAPB to have a much shorter generation time. Coastal/shelf waters often have greater amounts of AAPBs, some as high as 13.51% AAPB%. Phytoplankton also affect AAPB%, but little research has been performed in this area. They can also be abundant in various oligotrophic conditions, including the most oligotrophic regime of the world ocean. They are globally distributed in the euphotic zone and represent a hitherto unrecognized component of the marine microbial community that appears to be critical to the cycling of both organic and inorganic carbon in the ocean.
- Purple bacteria:
- Zetaproteobacteria: are iron-oxidizing neutrophilic chemolithoautotrophs, distributed worldwide in estuaries and marine habitats.
- Hydrogen oxidizing bacteria are facultative autotrophs that can be divided into aerobes and anaerobes. The former use hydrogen as an electron donor and oxygen as an acceptor while the latter use sulphate or nitrogen dioxide as electron acceptors.

== Motility ==
Bacterial flagellum rotated by a molecular motor at its base

Motility is the ability of an organism to move independently, using metabolic energy.

=== Flagellar motility ===
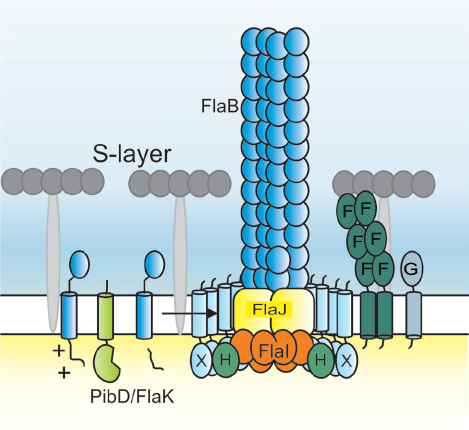
Model of an archaellum

Prokaryotic flagella run in a rotary movement, while eukaryotic flagella run in a bending movement

Prokaryotes, both bacteria and archaea, primarily use flagella for locomotion.

- Bacterial flagella are helical filaments, each with a rotary motor at its base which can turn clockwise or counterclockwise. They provide two of several kinds of bacterial motility.
- Archaeal flagella are called archaella, and function in much the same way as bacterial flagella. Structurally the archaellum is superficially similar to a bacterial flagellum, but it differs in many details and is considered non-homologous.

The rotary motor model used by bacteria uses the protons of an electrochemical gradient in order to move their flagella. Torque in the flagella of bacteria is created by particles that conduct protons around the base of the flagellum. The direction of rotation of the flagella in bacteria comes from the occupancy of the proton channels along the perimeter of the flagellar motor.

Some eukaryotic cells also use flagella—and they can be found in some protists and plants as well as animal cells. Eukaryotic flagella are complex cellular projections that lash back and forth, rather than in a circular motion. Prokaryotic flagella use a rotary motor, and the eukaryotic flagella use a complex sliding filament system. Eukaryotic flagella are ATP-driven, while prokaryotic flagella can be ATP-driven (archaea) or proton-driven (bacteria).

External videos
- Why do bacteria move like vibrating chaos snakes?

=== Twitching motility ===
Twitching motility is a form of crawling bacterial motility used to move over surfaces. Twitching is mediated by the activity of hair-like filaments called type IV pili which extend from the cell's exterior, bind to surrounding solid substrates and retract, pulling the cell forwards in a manner similar to the action of a grappling hook. The name twitching motility is derived from the characteristic jerky and irregular motions of individual cells when viewed under the microscope.

=== Gliding motility ===
Gliding motility is a type of translocation that is independent of propulsive structures such as flagella or pili. Gliding allows microorganisms to travel along the surface of low aqueous films. The mechanisms of this motility are only partially known. The speed of gliding varies between organisms, and the reversal of direction is seemingly regulated by some sort of internal clock. For example, the apicomplexans are able to travel at fast rates between 1–10 μm/s. In contrast Myxococcus xanthus bacteria glide at a rate of 5 μm/min.

=== Swarming motility ===
Swarming motility is a rapid (2–10 μm/s) and coordinated translocation of a bacterial population across solid or semi-solid surfaces, and is an example of bacterial multicellularity and swarm behaviour. Swarming motility was first reported in 1972 by Jorgen Henrichsen.

=== Non-motile ===
Non-motile species lack the ability and structures that would allow them to propel themselves, under their own power, through their environment. When non-motile bacteria are cultured in a stab tube, they only grow along the stab line. If the bacteria are mobile, the line will appear diffuse and extend into the medium.

== Taxis: Directed motion ==
=== Magnetotaxis ===
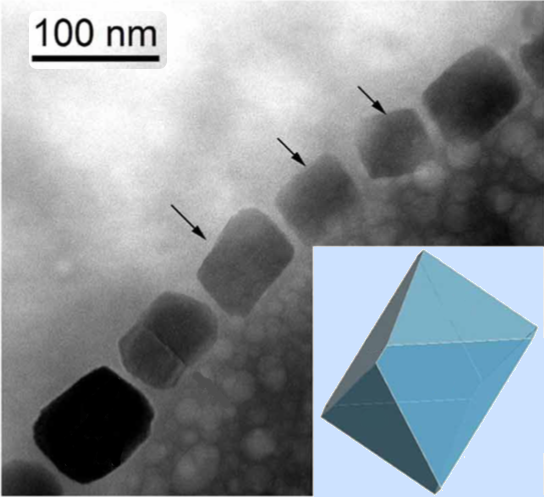
Magnetosome chain with octahedral habits modelled lower right

Magnetotactic bacteria orient themselves along the magnetic field lines of Earth's magnetic field. This alignment is believed to aid these organisms in reaching regions of optimal oxygen concentration. To perform this task, these bacteria have biomineralised organelles called magnetosomes that contain magnetic crystals. The biological phenomenon of microorganisms tending to move in response to the environment's magnetic characteristics is known as magnetotaxis. However, this term is misleading in that every other application of the term taxis involves a stimulus-response mechanism. In contrast to the magnetoreception of animals, the bacteria contain fixed magnets that force the bacteria into alignment—even dead cells are dragged into alignment, just like a compass needle.

Marine environments are generally characterized by low concentrations of nutrients kept in steady or intermittent motion by currents and turbulence. Marine bacteria have developed strategies, such as swimming and using directional sensing–response systems, to migrate towards favorable places in the nutrient gradients. Magnetotactic bacteria utilize Earth's magnetic field to facilitate downward swimming into the oxic–anoxic interface, which is the most favorable place for their persistence and proliferation, in chemically stratified sediments or water columns.

Earth's magnetic field

Depending on their latitude and whether the bacteria are north or south of the equator, the Earth's magnetic field has one of the two possible polarities, and a direction that points with varying angles into the ocean depths, and away from the generally more oxygen rich surface. Aerotaxis is the response by which bacteria migrate to an optimal oxygen concentration in an oxygen gradient. Various experiments have clearly shown that magnetotaxis and aerotaxis work in conjunction in magnetotactic bacteria. It has been shown that, in water droplets, one-way swimming magnetotactic bacteria can reverse their swimming direction and swim backwards under reducing conditions (less than optimal oxygen concentration), as opposed to oxic conditions (greater than optimal oxygen concentration).

Regardless of their morphology, all magnetotactic bacteria studied so far are motile by means of flagella. Marine magnetotactic bacteria in particular tend to possess an elaborate flagellar apparatus which can involve up to tens of thousands of flagella. However, despite extensive research in recent years, it has yet to be established whether magnetotactic bacteria steer their flagellar motors in response to their alignment in magnetic fields. Symbiosis with magnetotactic bacteria has been proposed as the explanation for magnetoreception in some marine protists. Research is underway on whether a similar relationship may underlie magnetoreception in vertebrates as well. The oldest unambiguous magnetofossils come from the Cretaceous chalk beds of southern England, though less certain reports of magnetofossils extend to 1.9 billion years old Gunflint Chert.

== Gas vacuoles ==
Some marine prokaryotes possess gas vacuoles. Gas vacuole are nanocompartments freely permeable to gas which allow marine bacteria and archaea to control their buoyancy. They take the form of spindle-shaped membrane-bound vesicles, and are found in some plankton prokaryotes, including some Cyanobacteria. Positive buoyancy is needed to keep the cells in the upper reaches of the water column, so that they can continue to perform photosynthesis. Gas vacuoles are made up of a shell of protein that has a highly hydrophobic inner surface, making it impermeable to water (and stopping water vapour from condensing inside) but permeable to most gases. Because the gas vesicle is a hollow cylinder, it is liable to collapse when the surrounding pressure increases. Natural selection has fine tuned the structure of the gas vesicle to maximise its resistance to buckling, including an external strengthening protein, GvpC, rather like the green thread in a braided hosepipe. There is a simple relationship between the diameter of the gas vesicle and pressure at which it will collapse—the wider the gas vesicle the weaker it becomes. However, wider gas vesicles are more efficient, providing more buoyancy per unit of protein than narrow gas vesicles. Different species produce gas vesicle of different diameter, allowing them to colonise different depths of the water column (fast growing, highly competitive species with wide gas vesicles in the top most layers; slow growing, dark-adapted, species with strong narrow gas vesicles in the deeper layers).

The cell achieves its height in the water column by synthesising gas vesicles. As the cell rises up, it is able to increase its carbohydrate load through increased photosynthesis. Too high and the cell will suffer photobleaching and possible death, however, the carbohydrate produced during photosynthesis increases the cell's density, causing it to sink. The daily cycle of carbohydrate build-up from photosynthesis and carbohydrate catabolism during dark hours is enough to fine-tune the cell's position in the water column, bring it up toward the surface when its carbohydrate levels are low and it needs to photosynthesis, and allowing it to sink away from the harmful UV radiation when the cell's carbohydrate levels have been replenished. An extreme excess of carbohydrate causes a significant change in the internal pressure of the cell, which causes the gas vesicles to buckle and collapse and the cell to sink out.

Large vacuoles are found in three genera of filamentous sulfur bacteria, the Thioploca, Beggiatoa and Thiomargarita. The cytosol is extremely reduced in these genera and the vacuole can occupy between 40 and 98% of the cell. The vacuole contains high concentrations of nitrate ions and is therefore thought to be a storage organelle.

== Bioluminescence ==
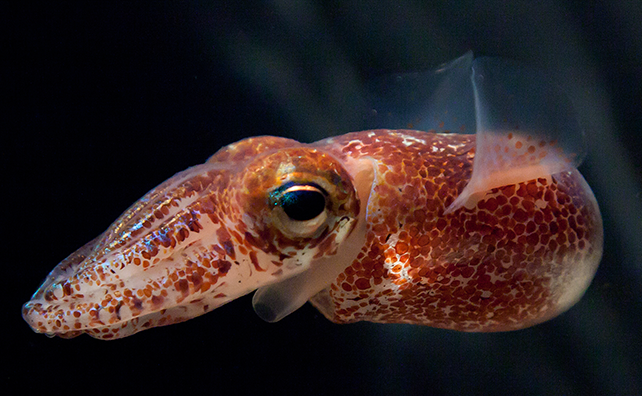
Hawaiian bobtail squid live in symbiosis with bioluminescent bacteria.

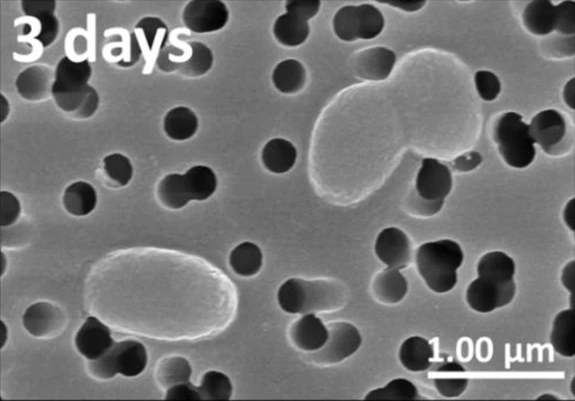
Vibrio harveyi incubated in seawater at 30 °C for 3 days

Bioluminescent bacteria are light-producing bacteria that are predominantly present in sea water, marine sediments, the surface of decomposing fish and in the gut of marine animals. While not as common, bacterial bioluminescence is also found in terrestrial and freshwater bacteria. These bacteria may be free living (such as Vibrio harveyi) or in symbiosis with animals such as the Hawaiian bobtail squid (Aliivibrio fischeri) or terrestrial nematodes (Photorhabdus luminescens). The host organisms provide these bacteria a safe home and sufficient nutrition. In exchange, the hosts use the light produced by the bacteria for camouflage, prey and/or mate attraction. Bioluminescent bacteria have evolved symbiotic relationships with other organisms in which both participants benefit close to equally. Another possible reason bacteria use luminescence reaction is for quorum sensing, an ability to regulate gene expression in response to bacterial cell density.

The Hawaiian bobtail squid lives in symbiosis with the bioluminescent bacteria Aliivibrio fischeri which inhabits a special light organ in the squid's mantle. The bacteria are fed sugar and amino acid by the squid and in return hide the squid's silhouette when viewed from below, counter-illuminating it by matching the amount of light hitting the top of the mantle. The squid serves as a model organism for animal-bacterial symbiosis and its relationship with the bacteria has been widely studied.

Vibrio harveyi is a rod-shaped, motile (via polar flagella) bioluminescent bacterium which grows optimally between 30 and 35 °C (86 and 95 °F). It can be found free-swimming in tropical marine waters, commensally in the gut microflora of marine animals, and as both a primary and opportunistic pathogen of a number of marine animals. It is thought to be the cause of the milky seas effect, where a uniform blue glow is emitted from seawater during the night. Some glows can cover nearly 6,000 sq mi (16,000 km^{2}).

== Microbial rhodopsin ==
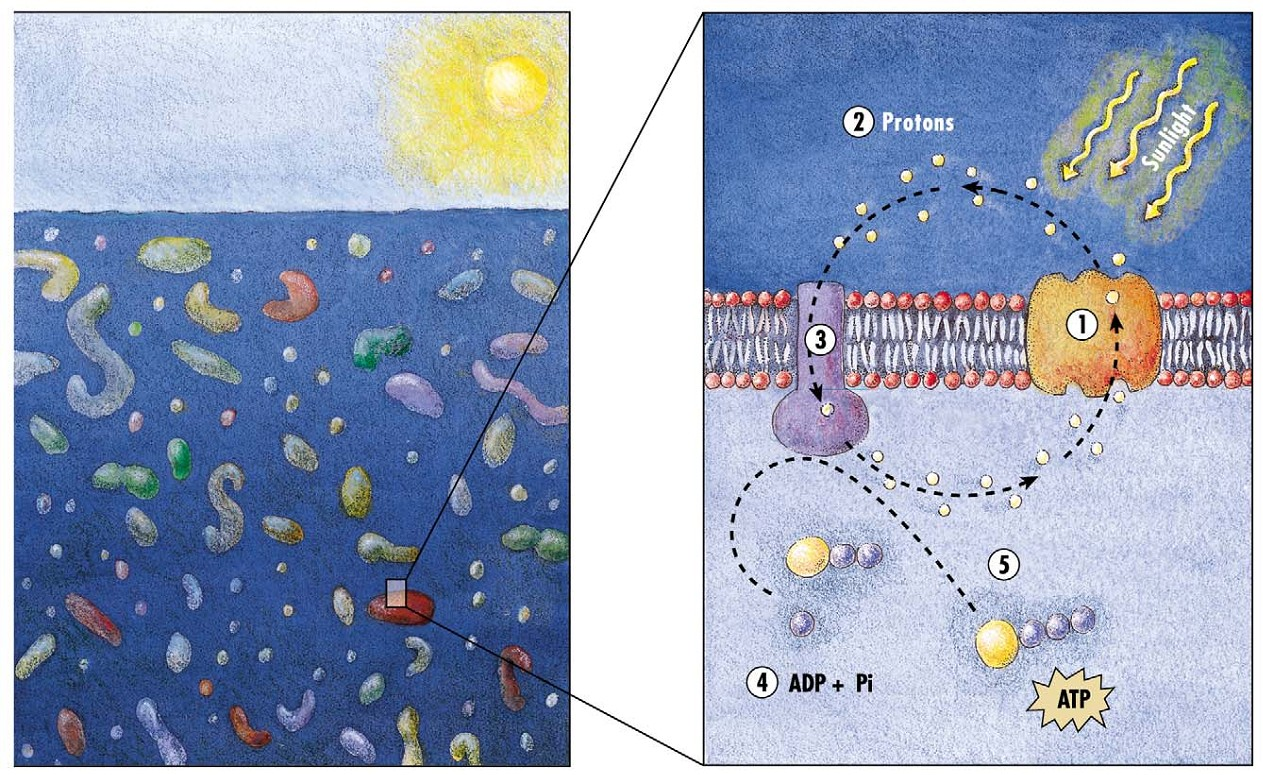
Model of the energy generating mechanism in marine bacteria (1) When sunlight strikes a rhodopsin molecule (2) it changes its configuration so a proton is expelled from the cell (3) the chemical potential causes the proton to flow back to the cell (4) thus generating energy (5) in the form of adenosine triphosphate.

Phototrophic metabolism relies on one of three energy-converting pigments: chlorophyll, bacteriochlorophyll, and retinal. Retinal is the chromophore found in rhodopsins. The significance of chlorophyll in converting light energy has been written about for decades, but phototrophy based on retinal pigments is just beginning to be studied.

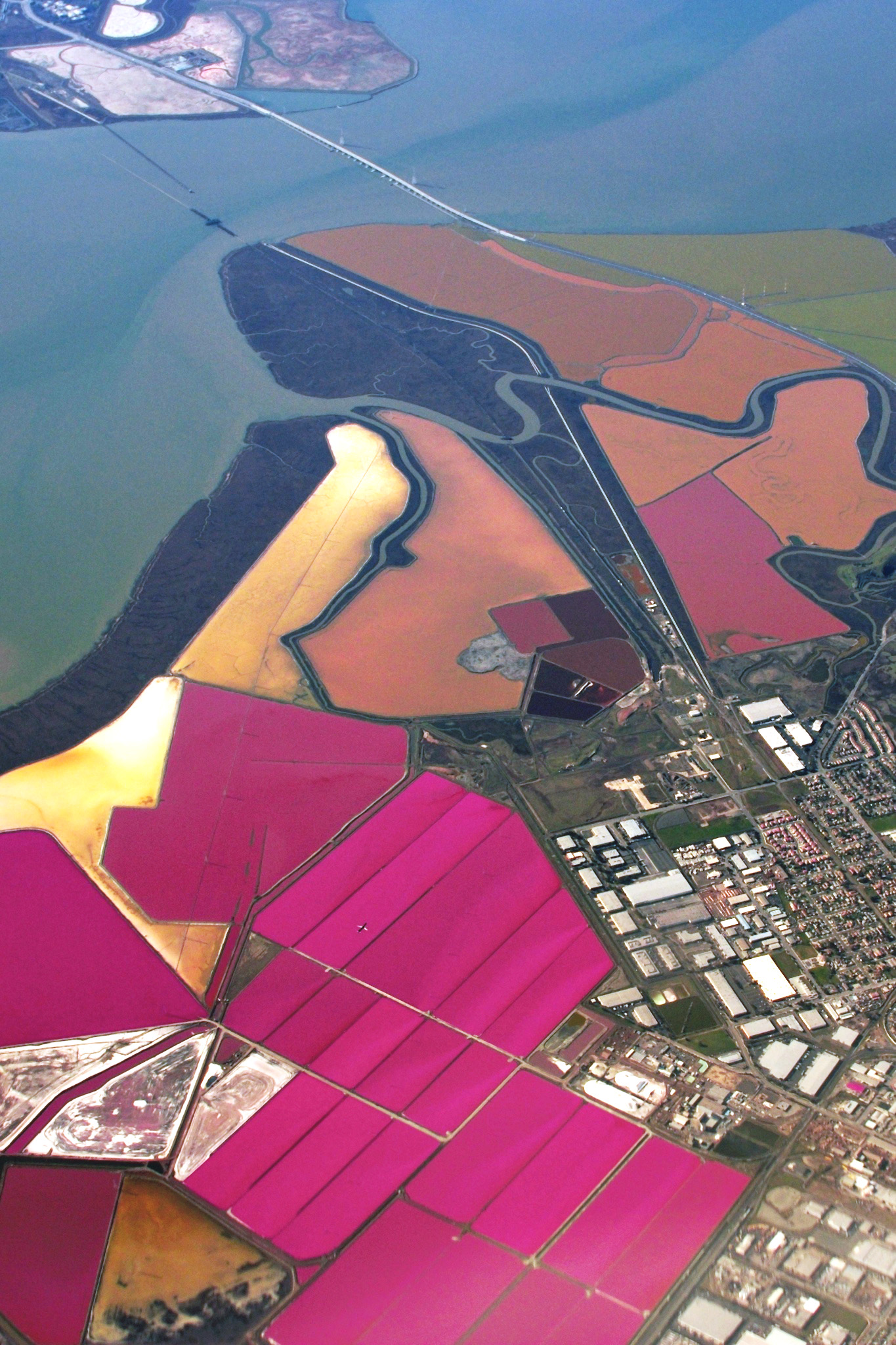
Halobacteria in salt evaporation ponds coloured purple by bacteriorhodopsin

In 2000 a team of microbiologists led by Edward DeLong made a crucial discovery in the understanding of the marine carbon and energy cycles. They discovered a gene in several species of bacteria responsible for production of the protein rhodopsin, previously unheard of in bacteria. These proteins found in the cell membranes are capable of converting light energy to biochemical energy due to a change in configuration of the rhodopsin molecule as sunlight strikes it, causing the pumping of a proton from inside out and a subsequent inflow that generates the energy. The archaeal-like rhodopsins have subsequently been found among different taxa, protists as well as in bacteria and archaea, though they are rare in complex multicellular organisms.

Research in 2019 shows these "sun-snatching bacteria" are more widespread than previously thought and could change how oceans are affected by global warming. "The findings break from the traditional interpretation of marine ecology found in textbooks, which states that nearly all sunlight in the ocean is captured by chlorophyll in algae. Instead, rhodopsin-equipped bacteria function like hybrid cars, powered by organic matter when available—as most bacteria are—and by sunlight when nutrients are scarce."

There is an astrobiological conjecture called the Purple Earth hypothesis which surmises that original life forms on Earth were retinal-based rather than chlorophyll-based, which would have made the Earth appear purple instead of green.

== Symbiosis ==
Some marine organisms have a symbiosis with bacteria or archaea. Pompeii worms live at great depths by hydrothermal vents at temperatures up to 80 °C (176 °F). They have what appear to be hairy backs, but these "hairs" are actually colonies of bacteria such as Nautilia profundicola, which are thought to afford the worm some degree of insulation. Glands on the worm's back secrete a mucus on which the bacteria feed, a form of symbiosis.

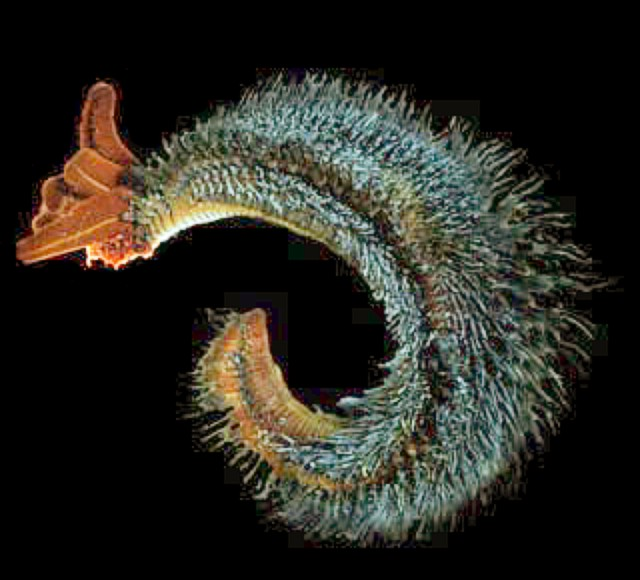
The "hairy" backs of Pompeii worms are colonies of symbiotic bacteria.

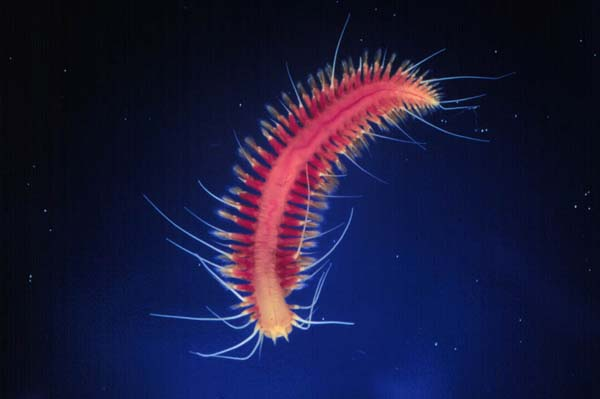
Hesiocaeca methanicola lives at great depths on methane ice and appear to survive in symbiosis with bacteria which metabolize the clathrate.

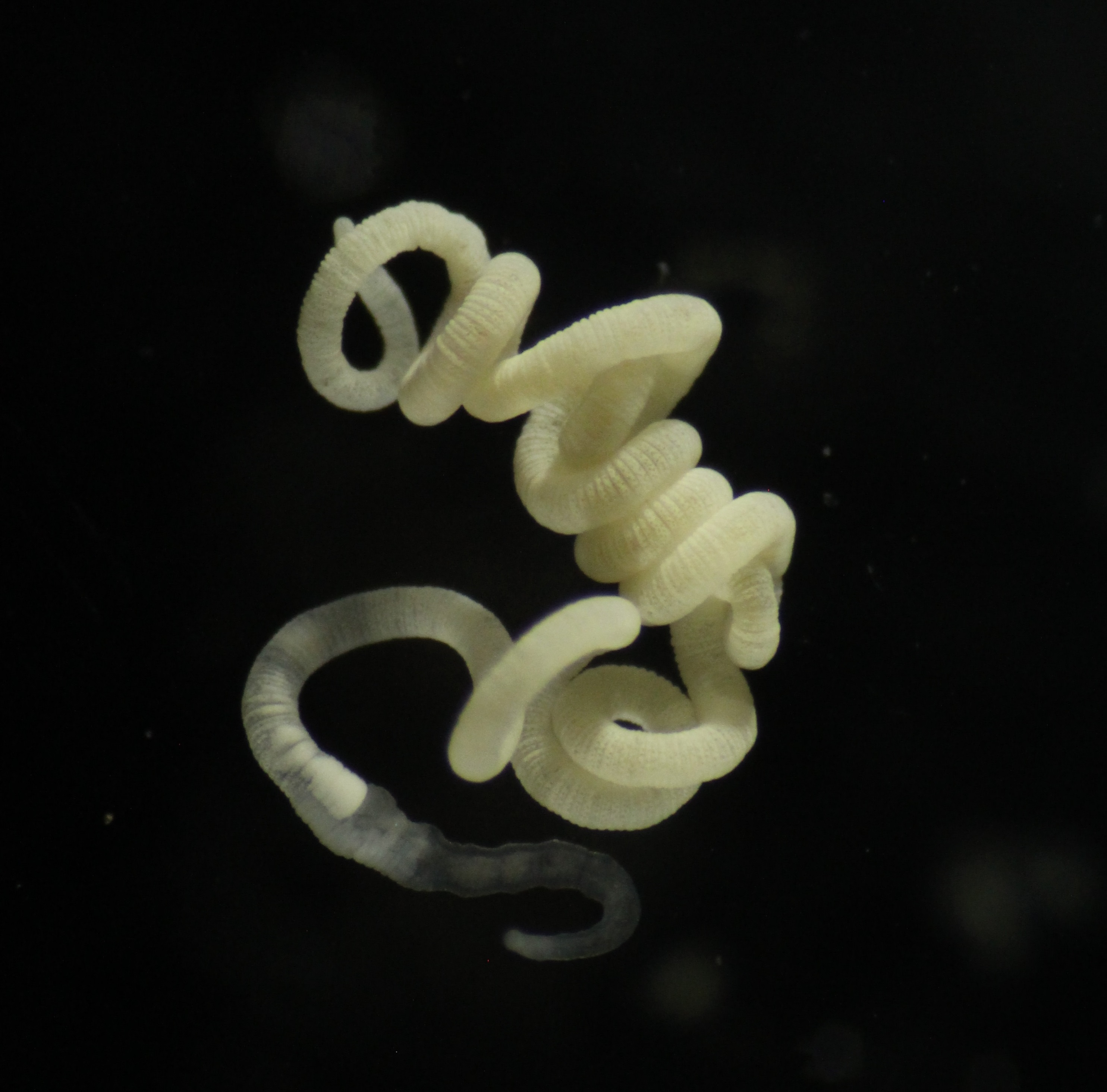
Olavius algarvensis depends on five different species of symbiotic bacteria for its nutrition.

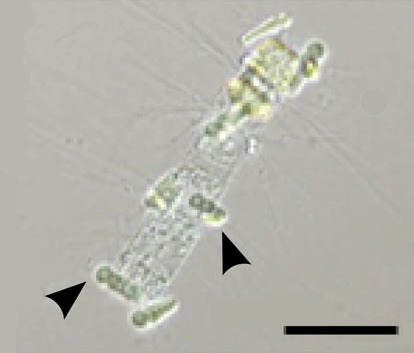
Epiphytic Calothrix cyanobacteria (arrows) in symbiosis with a Chaetoceros diatom. Scale bar 50 μm.

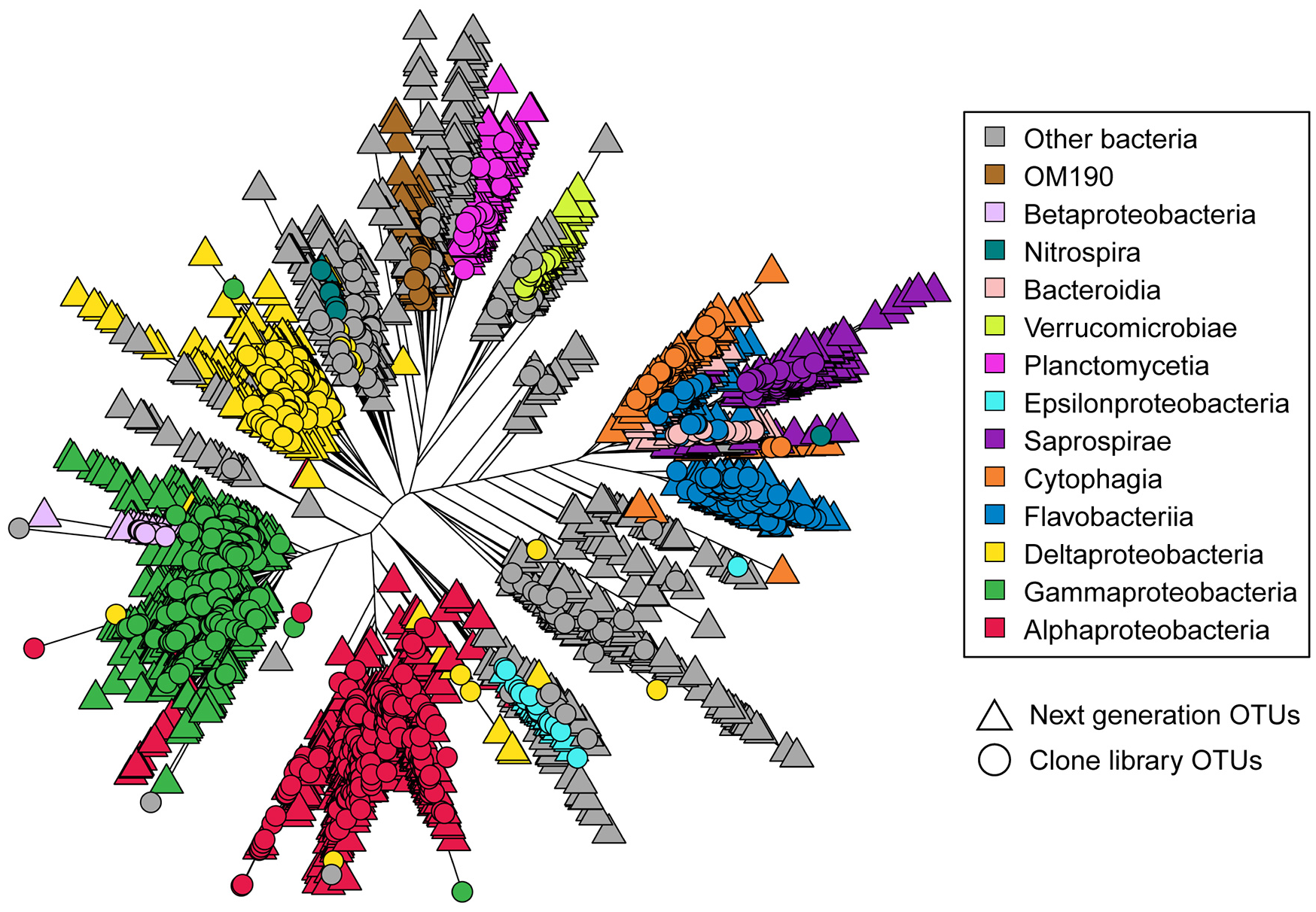
Phylogenetic tree representing bacterial OTUs from clone libraries and next-generation sequencing. OTUs from next-generation sequencing are displayed if the OTU contained more than two sequences in the unrarefied OTU table (3626 OTUs).

Endosymbiont bacteria are bacteria that live within the body or cells of another organism. Some types of cyanobacteria are endosymbiont and cyanobacteria have been found to possess genes that enable them to undergo nitrogen fixation.

Organisms typically establish a symbiotic relationship due to their limited availability of resources in their habitat or due to a limitation of their food source. Symbiotic, chemosynthetic bacteria that have been discovered associated with mussels (Bathymodiolus) located near hydrothermal vents have a gene that enables them to utilize hydrogen as a source of energy, in preference to sulphur or methane as their energy source for production of energy.

Olavius algarvensis is a worm which lives in coastal sediments in the Mediterranean and depends on symbiotic bacteria for its nutrition. It lives with five different species of bacteria located under its cuticle: two sulfide-oxidizing, two sulfate-reducing and one spirochaete. The symbiotic bacteria also allow the worm to use hydrogen and carbon monoxide as energy sources, and to metabolise organic compounds like malate and acetate.

Astrangia poculata, the northern star coral, is a temperate stony coral, widely documented along the eastern coast of the United States. The coral can live with and without zooxanthellae (algal symbionts), making it an ideal model organism to study microbial community interactions associated with symbiotic state. However, the ability to develop primers and probes to more specifically target key microbial groups has been hindered by the lack of full length 16S rRNA sequences, since sequences produced by the Illumina platform are of insufficient length (approximately 250 base pairs) for the design of primers and probes. In 2019, Goldsmith et al. demonstrated Sanger sequencing was capable of reproducing the biologically-relevant diversity detected by deeper next-generation sequencing, while also producing longer sequences useful to the research community for probe and primer design (see diagram on right).

== Roles in marine food webs ==
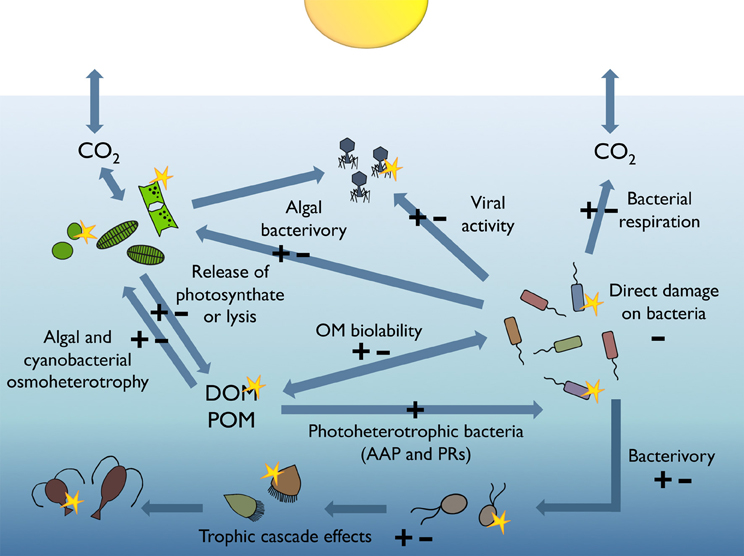
Bacterioplankton and the pelagic marine food web Solar radiation can have positive (+) or negative (−) effects resulting in increases or decreases in the heterotrophic activity of bacterioplankton.

Most of the volume of the world ocean is in darkness. The processes occurring within the thin illuminated surface layer (the photic layer from the surface down to between 50 and 170 metres) are of major significance to the global biosphere. For example, the visible region of the solar spectrum (the so-called photosynthetically available radiation or PAR) reaching this sunlit layer fuels about half of the primary productivity of the planet, and is responsible for about half of the atmospheric oxygen necessary for most life on Earth.

Heterotrophic bacterioplankton are main consumers of dissolved organic matter (DOM) in pelagic marine food webs, including the sunlit upper layers of the ocean. Their sensitivity to ultraviolet radiation (UVR), together with some recently discovered mechanisms bacteria have evolved to benefit from photosynthetically available radiation (PAR), suggest that natural sunlight plays a relevant, yet difficult to predict role in modulating bacterial biogeochemical functions in the oceans.

Ocean surface habitats sit at the interface between the atmosphere and the ocean. The biofilm-like habitat at the surface of the ocean harbours surface-dwelling microorganisms, commonly referred to as neuston. This vast air–water interface sits at the intersection of major air–water exchange processes spanning more than 70% of the global surface area . Bacteria in the surface microlayer of the ocean, called bacterioneuston, are of interest due to practical applications such as air-sea gas exchange of greenhouse gases, production of climate-active marine aerosols, and remote sensing of the ocean. Of specific interest is the production and degradation of surfactants (surface active materials) via microbial biochemical processes. Major sources of surfactants in the open ocean include phytoplankton, terrestrial runoff, and deposition from the atmosphere.

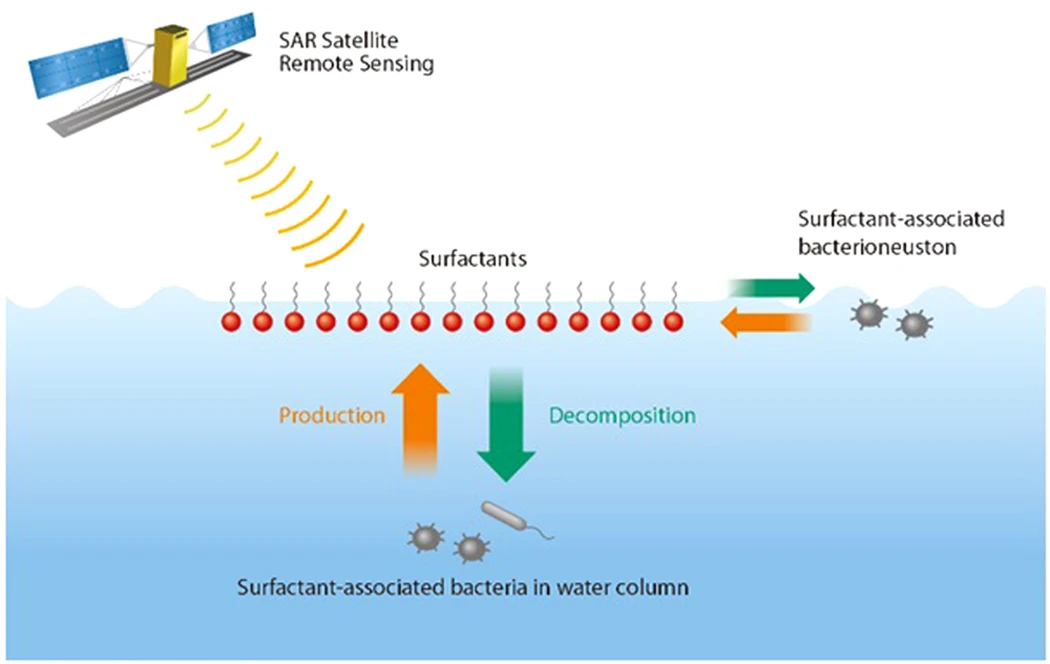
Bacteria, sea slicks and satellite remote sensing Surfactants are capable of dampening the short capillary ocean surface waves and smoothing the sea surface. Synthetic aperture radar (SAR) satellite remote sensing can detect areas with concentrated surfactants or sea slicks, which appear as dark areas on the SAR images.

Unlike coloured algal blooms, surfactant-associated bacteria may not be visible in ocean colour imagery. Having the ability to detect these "invisible" surfactant-associated bacteria using synthetic aperture radar has immense benefits in all-weather conditions, regardless of cloud, fog, or daylight. This is particularly important in very high winds, because these are the conditions when the most intense air-sea gas exchanges and marine aerosol production take place. Therefore, in addition to colour satellite imagery, SAR satellite imagery may provide additional insights into a global picture of biophysical processes at the boundary between the ocean and atmosphere, air-sea greenhouse gas exchanges and production of climate-active marine aerosols.

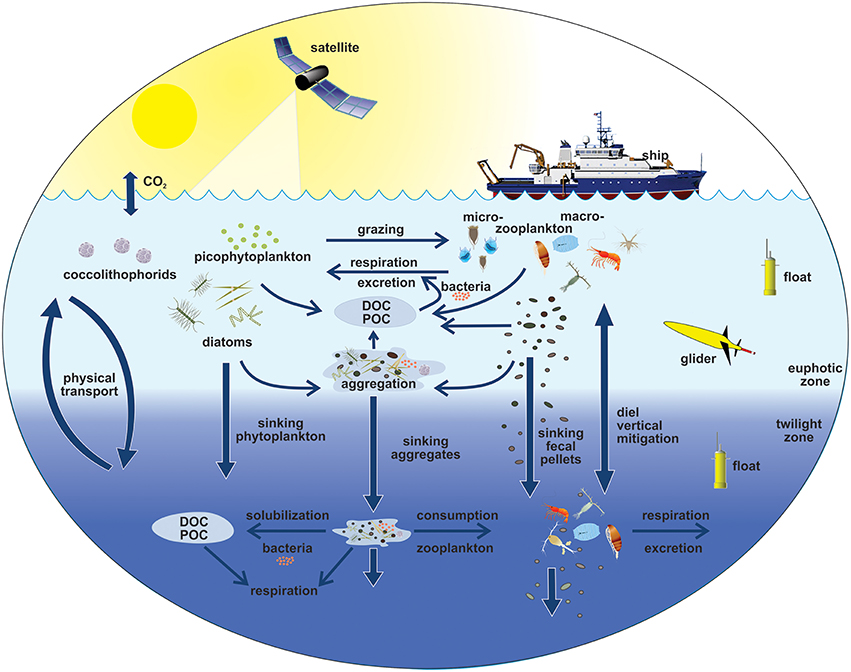
Export processes in the ocean from remote sensing

The diagram on the right shows links among the ocean's biological pump and the pelagic food web and the ability to sample these components remotely from ships, satellites, and autonomous vehicles. Light blue waters are the euphotic zone, while the darker blue waters represent the twilight zone.

== Roles in biogeochemical cycling ==
Archaea recycle elements such as carbon, nitrogen, and sulfur through their various habitats. Archaea carry out many steps in the nitrogen cycle. This includes both reactions that remove nitrogen from ecosystems (such as nitrate-based respiration and denitrification) as well as processes that introduce nitrogen (such as nitrate assimilation and nitrogen fixation).

Researchers recently discovered archaeal involvement in ammonia oxidation reactions. These reactions are particularly important in the oceans. In the sulfur cycle, archaea that grow by oxidizing sulfur compounds release this element from rocks, making it available to other organisms, but the archaea that do this, such as Sulfolobus, produce sulfuric acid as a waste product, and the growth of these organisms in abandoned mines can contribute to acid mine drainage and other environmental damage. In the carbon cycle, methanogen archaea remove hydrogen and play an important role in the decay of organic matter by the populations of microorganisms that act as decomposers in anaerobic ecosystems, such as sediments and marshes.

== See also ==
- Bacterioplankton counting methods
- Bioluminescent bacteria
- Iron-oxidizing bacteria
- Pelagibacterales – model organisms in streamlining theory
- Streamlining theory
