= Pseudoalteromonas issachenkonii =

Scientific classification
- Domain: Bacteria
- Kingdom: Pseudomonadati
- Phylum: Pseudomonadota
- Class: Gammaproteobacteria
- Order: Alteromonadales
- Family: Pseudoalteromonadaceae
- Genus: Pseudoalteromonas
- Species: P. issachenkonii

Binomial name
- Pseudoalteromonas issachenkonii Ivanova et al., 2002

Species of bacterium

Pseudoalteromonas issachenkonii is species of gram-negative marine bacterium which was isolated from the brown alga Fucus evanescens near the Kurile Islands.
