= Pseudoalteromonas distincta =

Scientific classification
- Domain: Bacteria
- Kingdom: Pseudomonadati
- Phylum: Pseudomonadota
- Class: Gammaproteobacteria
- Order: Alteromonadales
- Family: Pseudoalteromonadaceae
- Genus: Pseudoalteromonas
- Species: P. distincta

Binomial name
- Pseudoalteromonas distincta (Romanenko et al., 1995); Ivanova et al., 2000

Synonyms
- Alteromonas distincta

Species of bacterium

Pseudoalteromonas distincta is a marine bacterium.

== History ==
Pseudoalteromonas distincta was isolated from a marine sponge near the Komandorski Islands in 1995. In 2000, Alteromonas distincta was reclassified and added to Pseudoalteromonas distincta.
