= Pseudoalteromonas bacteriolytica =

Scientific classification
- Domain: Bacteria
- Kingdom: Pseudomonadati
- Phylum: Pseudomonadota
- Class: Gammaproteobacteria
- Order: Alteromonadales
- Family: Pseudoalteromonadaceae
- Genus: Pseudoalteromonas
- Species: P. bacteriolytica

Binomial name
- Pseudoalteromonas bacteriolytica Sawabe et al., 1998

Synonyms
- Pseudomonas bacteriolytica Sawabe et al.

Species of bacterium

Pseudoalteromonas bacteriolytica is a marine bacterium that causes red spot disease of Saccharina japonica (species synonym Laminaria japonica).
