= Pseudoalteromonas paragorgicola =

Scientific classification
- Domain: Bacteria
- Kingdom: Pseudomonadati
- Phylum: Pseudomonadota
- Class: Gammaproteobacteria
- Order: Alteromonadales
- Family: Pseudoalteromonadaceae
- Genus: Pseudoalteromonas
- Species: P. paragorgicola

Binomial name
- Pseudoalteromonas paragorgicola Ivanova et al., 2002

Species of bacterium

Pseudoalteromonas paragorgicola is a marine bacterium isolated from a sponge in the Pacific Ocean.
