= Moritella profunda =

Scientific classification
- Domain: Bacteria
- Kingdom: Pseudomonadati
- Phylum: Pseudomonadota
- Class: Gammaproteobacteria
- Order: Alteromonadales
- Family: Moritellaceae
- Genus: Moritella
- Species: M. profunda

Binomial name
- Moritella profunda Xu et al. 2003

Species of bacterium

Moritella profunda is a species of gram-negative, rod-shaped bacterium from the family Moritellaceae. First isolated from the deep Atlantic, M. profunda is well adapted to growth in deep sea environments. Optimum growth of M. profunda requires increased pressure and cold temperatures (2 °C).
