= Pseudoalteromonas marina =

Scientific classification
- Domain: Bacteria
- Kingdom: Pseudomonadati
- Phylum: Pseudomonadota
- Class: Gammaproteobacteria
- Order: Alteromonadales
- Family: Pseudoalteromonadaceae
- Genus: Pseudoalteromonas
- Species: P. marina

Binomial name
- Pseudoalteromonas marina Nam et al., 2007

Species of bacterium

Pseudoalteromonas marina is a marine bacterium isolated from tidal sediment near Chungnam.
