= Pseudoalteromonas byunsanensis =

Scientific classification
- Domain: Bacteria
- Kingdom: Pseudomonadati
- Phylum: Pseudomonadota
- Class: Gammaproteobacteria
- Order: Alteromonadales
- Family: Pseudoalteromonadaceae
- Genus: Pseudoalteromonas
- Species: P. byunsanensis

Binomial name
- Pseudoalteromonas byunsanensis Park et al., 2005

Synonyms
- Pseudomonas byunsanensis Park et al.

Species of bacterium

Pseudoalteromonas byunsanensis is a gram-negative, marine bacterium "isolated from tidal flat sediment of Byunsan, South Korea. P. byunsanensis is motile and strictly aerobic. Cells are catalase and oxidase positive.
