= Algicola sagamiensis =

Scientific classification
- Domain: Bacteria
- Kingdom: Pseudomonadati
- Phylum: Pseudomonadota
- Class: Gammaproteobacteria
- Order: Alteromonadales
- Family: Pseudoalteromonadaceae
- Genus: Algicola
- Species: A. sagamiensis

Binomial name
- Algicola sagamiensis Nam et al., 2007

Synonyms
- Pseudoalteromonas sagamiensis

Species of bacterium

Algicola sagamiensis is a marine bacterium isolated from sea water in Sagami Bay. It was originally named Pseudoalteromonas sagamiensis but was reclassified in 2007 into the genus Algicola.
