= Pseudoalteromonas ulvae =

Scientific classification
- Domain: Bacteria
- Kingdom: Pseudomonadati
- Phylum: Pseudomonadota
- Class: Gammaproteobacteria
- Order: Alteromonadales
- Family: Pseudoalteromonadaceae
- Genus: Pseudoalteromonas
- Species: P. ulvae

Binomial name
- Pseudoalteromonas ulvae Egan et al., 2001

Species of bacterium

Pseudoalteromonas ulvae is a marine bacterium isolated from the alga Ulva lactuca at the intertidal zone near Sydney.
