= Pseudoalteromonas peptidolytica =

Scientific classification
- Domain: Bacteria
- Kingdom: Pseudomonadati
- Phylum: Pseudomonadota
- Class: Gammaproteobacteria
- Order: Alteromonadales
- Family: Pseudoalteromonadaceae
- Genus: Pseudoalteromonas
- Species: P. peptidolytica

Binomial name
- Pseudoalteromonas peptidolytica Venkateswaran and Dohmoto 2000

Species of bacterium

Pseudoalteromonas peptidolytica is a marine bacterium isolated from the sea surrounding Yamato Island in the Sea of Japan.
