= Pseudoalteromonas arctica =

Scientific classification
- Domain: Bacteria
- Kingdom: Pseudomonadati
- Phylum: Pseudomonadota
- Class: Gammaproteobacteria
- Order: Alteromonadales
- Family: Pseudoalteromonadaceae
- Genus: Pseudoalteromonas
- Species: P. arctica

Binomial name
- Pseudoalteromonas arctica Khudary et al., 2008

Synonyms
- Pseudomonas arctica Khudary et al., 2008

Species of bacterium

Pseudoalteromonas arctica is a gram-negative, marine bacterium collected from Spitzbergen in the Arctic.

A strain found in 2020 in Antarctica was able to synthesize undecane.
