= Pseudoalteromonas rubra =

Scientific classification
- Domain: Bacteria
- Kingdom: Pseudomonadati
- Phylum: Pseudomonadota
- Class: Gammaproteobacteria
- Order: Alteromonadales
- Family: Pseudoalteromonadaceae
- Genus: Pseudoalteromonas
- Species: P. rubra

Binomial name
- Pseudoalteromonas rubra (Gauthier 1976); Gauthier et al., 1995

Synonyms
- Alteromonas rubra

Species of marine bacterium

Pseudoalteromonas rubra is a marine bacterium that belongs to the domain Bacteria, phylum Pseudomonas Dota, class Gammaproteobacteria, order Alteromonadales, family Pseudo Alteromonadaceae, and genus Pseudoalteromonas. This bacterium is Gram-negative and rod-shaped, which is typical for many marine bacteria. It is also motile, meaning it has the ability to move independently, which can be advantageous in its natural habitat.

This bacterium is commonly found in surface seawater, where it thrives in the marine environment. It grows well in marine broth at temperatures ranging from 22°C to 30°C, but it does not grow at temperatures below 10°C or above 41°C. This specific temperature range indicates its adaptation to the relatively stable temperatures of the ocean surface.

Pseudoalteromonas rubra plays a significant ecological role, especially during algal blooms. These bacteria are highly productive and can utilize a variety of carbon sources, which gives them a competitive edge over other microorganisms in the same environment. Their ability to thrive in such conditions makes them an important part of the marine microbial community.

The type strain of Pseudoalteromonas rubra is often used in research to understand more about its characteristics and potential applications. Researchers are particularly interested in its interactions with other marine organisms and its potential uses in biotechnology, such as the production of bioactive compounds that could have pharmaceutical or industrial applications.
