= Pseudoalteromonas nigrifaciens =

Scientific classification
- Domain: Bacteria
- Kingdom: Pseudomonadati
- Phylum: Pseudomonadota
- Class: Gammaproteobacteria
- Order: Alteromonadales
- Family: Pseudoalteromonadaceae
- Genus: Pseudoalteromonas
- Species: P. nigrifaciens

Binomial name
- Pseudoalteromonas nigrifaciens (Baumann et al. 1984); Gauthier et al. 1995

Synonyms
- Pseudomonas nigrifaciens White 1940; Alteromonas nigrifaciens (ex White 1940) Baumann et al. 1984

Species of bacterium

Pseudoalteromonas nigrifaciens is a marine bacterium. It has been observed to cause skin ulcer syndrome in juvenile cultivated sea cucumbers. P. nigrifaciens stains Gram-negative.
