= Pseudoalteromonas citrea =

Scientific classification
- Domain: Bacteria
- Kingdom: Pseudomonadati
- Phylum: Pseudomonadota
- Class: Gammaproteobacteria
- Order: Alteromonadales
- Family: Pseudoalteromonadaceae
- Genus: Pseudoalteromonas
- Species: P. citrea

Binomial name
- Pseudoalteromonas citrea (Gauthier 1977); Gauthier et al., 1995

Synonyms
- Alteromonas citrea Gauthier 1977; Pseudomonas citrea Gauthier et al., 1995

Species of bacterium

Pseudoalteromonas citrea is a yellow-pigmented marine bacterium that is antibiotic-producing and was isolated from Mediterranean waters off Nice. Originally named Alteromonas citrea, nearly two decades later it was reclassified as part of the Genus Pseudoalteromonas. Cells are gram-negative.
