= Lambda-carrageenase =

Identifiers
- EC no.: 3.2.1.162

Databases
- IntEnz: IntEnz view
- BRENDA: BRENDA entry
- ExPASy: NiceZyme view
- KEGG: KEGG entry
- MetaCyc: metabolic pathway
- PRIAM: profile
- PDB structures: RCSB PDB PDBe PDBsum
- Gene Ontology: AmiGO / QuickGO
Search
- PMC: articles
- PubMed: articles
- NCBI: proteins

Lambda-carrageenase (EC 3.2.1.162, endo-beta-1,4-carrageenose 2,6,2'-trisulfate-hydrolase) is an enzyme which breaks down a polysaccharide found in red seaweeds, lambda-carrageenan. This enzyme has only been found in marine bacteria.

== Species distribution ==
Two bacteria which produce lambda-carrageenase have been found. The marine bacterium Pseudoalteromonas carrageenovora (also known as Alteromonas carrageenovora) strain ATCC 43555, which was isolated from sea water in Nova Scotia, and the deep-sea bacterial isolate Pseudoalteromonas sp. CL19, which was isolated from a sediment sample from Suruga Bay, Japan.

== Properties of the enzyme ==
In both Alteromonas carrageenovora and Pseudoalteromonas sp. CL19, lambda-carrageenase is encoded by the cglA gene. The product of this gene is a protein consisting of 942 amino acids, this protein includes a 25 amino acid signal peptide. Lambda-carrageenase is found as a monomer. Its optimum pH for activity is 7.0, and optimum temperature is 35 °C. The enzyme specifically hydrolyses lambda-carrageenan, and is not active against iota- and kappa-carrageenans, agarose or porphyran.

== Mechanism of action ==
Lambda-carrageenase cleaves the beta 1-4 glycosidic bonds in the linear backbone of lambda-carrageenan. This results in the formation of a tetrasaccharide: alpha-D-Galp2,6S(2)-(1->3)-beta-D-Galp2S-(1->4)-alpha-D-Galp2,6S(2)-(1->3)-D-Galp2S. This enzyme acts via a single displacement mechanism, causing an inversion of anomeric configuration of the substrate.
