= Pseudoalteromonas prydzensis =

Scientific classification
- Domain: Bacteria
- Kingdom: Pseudomonadati
- Phylum: Pseudomonadota
- Class: Gammaproteobacteria
- Order: Alteromonadales
- Family: Pseudoalteromonadaceae
- Genus: Pseudoalteromonas
- Species: P. prydzensis

Binomial name
- Pseudoalteromonas prydzensis Bowman 1998

Species of bacterium

Pseudoalteromonas prydzensis is a marine bacterium isolated from Antarctic sea ice. The species is psychrophilic and halolerant.
