= Pseudoalteromonas lipolytica =

Scientific classification
- Domain: Bacteria
- Kingdom: Pseudomonadati
- Phylum: Pseudomonadota
- Class: Gammaproteobacteria
- Order: Alteromonadales
- Family: Pseudoalteromonadaceae
- Genus: Pseudoalteromonas
- Species: P. lipolytica

Binomial name
- Pseudoalteromonas lipolytica Xu et al. 2010

Species of bacterium

Pseudoalteromonas lipolytica is a marine bacterium which was isolated from the Yangtze River.
