= Pseudoalteromonas elyakovii =

Scientific classification
- Domain: Bacteria
- Kingdom: Pseudomonadati
- Phylum: Pseudomonadota
- Class: Gammaproteobacteria
- Order: Alteromonadales
- Family: Pseudoalteromonadaceae
- Genus: Pseudoalteromonas
- Species: P. elyakovii

Binomial name
- Pseudoalteromonas elyakovii (Ivanova et al., 1997); Sawabe et al., 2000

Synonyms
- Alteromonas elyakovii

Species of bacterium

Pseudoalteromonas elyakovii is a marine bacterium.

== History ==
Alteromonas elyakovii was isolated from the mussel Crenomytilus grayanus in Troitsa Bay in 1985. In 2000, A. elyakovii was reclassified as Pseudoalteromonas elyakovii along with five strains of bacteria which had been isolated from the seaweed Laminaria japonica.
