= Pseudoalteromonas flavipulchra =

Scientific classification
- Domain: Bacteria
- Kingdom: Pseudomonadati
- Phylum: Pseudomonadota
- Class: Gammaproteobacteria
- Order: Alteromonadales
- Family: Pseudoalteromonadaceae
- Genus: Pseudoalteromonas
- Species: P. flavipulchra

Binomial name
- Pseudoalteromonas flavipulchra Ivanova et al., 2002

Species of bacterium

Pseudoalteromonas flavipulchra is a rod-shaped gram-negative marine bacterium.
