= Pseudoalteromonas agarivorans =

Scientific classification
- Domain: Bacteria
- Kingdom: Pseudomonadati
- Phylum: Pseudomonadota
- Class: Gammaproteobacteria
- Order: Alteromonadales
- Family: Pseudoalteromonadaceae
- Genus: Pseudoalteromonas
- Species: P. agarivorans

Binomial name
- Pseudoalteromonas agarivorans Romanenko et al., 2003

Species of bacterium

Pseudoalteromonas agarivorans is a marine bacterium.
