= Pseudoalteromonas mariniglutinosa =

Scientific classification
- Domain: Bacteria
- Kingdom: Pseudomonadati
- Phylum: Pseudomonadota
- Class: Gammaproteobacteria
- Order: Alteromonadales
- Family: Pseudoalteromonadaceae
- Genus: Pseudoalteromonas
- Species: P. mariniglutinosa

Binomial name
- Pseudoalteromonas mariniglutinosa (ex Berland et al. 1969); Romanenko et al. 2003

Synonyms
- Pseudomonas marinoglutinosa Berland et al. 1969

Species of bacterium

Pseudoalteromonas mariniglutinosa is a marine bacterium. Cells are Gram-negative.
