= Pseudoalteromonas atlantica =

Scientific classification
- Domain: Bacteria
- Kingdom: Pseudomonadati
- Phylum: Pseudomonadota
- Class: Gammaproteobacteria
- Order: Alteromonadales
- Family: Pseudoalteromonadaceae
- Genus: Pseudoalteromonas
- Species: P. atlantica

Binomial name
- Pseudoalteromonas atlantica (Akagawa-Matsushita et al., 1992); Gauthier et al., 1995

Type strain
- ATCC 19262; CIP 104721; IAM 12927; NCIMB 301; JCM 8845

Synonyms
- Alteromonas atlantica Akagawa-Matsushita et al., 1992; Pseudomonas atlantica Humm

Species of bacterium

Pseudoalteromonas atlantica is a marine bacterium, which has been shown to act as a primary producer of biofilms and exhibit virulence against Cancer pagurus, a species of crab, through secretion of extracellular products. The species was first described as Alteromonas alantica in 1992.
