= Pseudoalteromonas ruthenica =

Scientific classification
- Domain: Bacteria
- Kingdom: Pseudomonadati
- Phylum: Pseudomonadota
- Class: Gammaproteobacteria
- Order: Alteromonadales
- Family: Pseudoalteromonadaceae
- Genus: Pseudoalteromonas
- Species: P. ruthenica

Binomial name
- Pseudoalteromonas ruthenica Ivanova et al., 2002

Synonyms
- Alteromonas luteo-violaceus

Species of bacterium

Pseudoalteromonas ruthenica is a marine bacterium isolated from the mussel Crenomytilus grayanus and the scallop Patinopecten yessoensis in the Gulf of Peter the Great, Sea of Japan. Cells are gram-negative and rod shaped.
