= Pseudoalteromonas piscicida =

Scientific classification
- Domain: Bacteria
- Kingdom: Pseudomonadati
- Phylum: Pseudomonadota
- Class: Gammaproteobacteria
- Order: Alteromonadales
- Family: Pseudoalteromonadaceae
- Genus: Pseudoalteromonas
- Species: P. piscicida

Binomial name
- Pseudoalteromonas piscicida (ex Bein 1954); Gauthier et al. 1995

Synonyms
- Flavobacterium piscicida Bein 1954; Pseudomonas piscicida (Bein 1954) Buck et al. 1963

Species of bacterium

Pseudoalteromonas piscicida is a gram-negative marine bacterium. It is known to produce a quorum sensing molecule called 2-heptyl-4-quinolone (HHQ), which functions as a bacterial infochemical. Research into the effects of this infochemical on phytoplankton is currently being conducted by Dr. Kristen Whalen of Haverford College.
