= Pseudoalteromonas antarctica =

Scientific classification
- Domain: Bacteria
- Kingdom: Pseudomonadati
- Phylum: Pseudomonadota
- Class: Gammaproteobacteria
- Order: Alteromonadales
- Family: Pseudoalteromonadaceae
- Genus: Pseudoalteromonas
- Species: P. antarctica

Binomial name
- Pseudoalteromonas antarctica Bozal et al., 1997

Synonyms
- Pseudomonas antarctica Bozal et al., 1997

Species of bacterium

Pseudoalteromonas antarctica is a gram-negative, marine bacterium isolated from Antarctic coastal marine environments. The species is motile through a polar flagella. P. antarctica is moderately halophilic, tolerating salt concentrations between 9 - 12.5%.
