= Pseudoalteromonas undina =

Scientific classification
- Domain: Bacteria
- Kingdom: Pseudomonadati
- Phylum: Pseudomonadota
- Class: Gammaproteobacteria
- Order: Alteromonadales
- Family: Pseudoalteromonadaceae
- Genus: Pseudoalteromonas
- Species: P. undina

Binomial name
- Pseudoalteromonas undina (Chan et al., 1978); Gauthier et al., 1995

Synonyms
- Alteromonas undina

Species of bacterium

Pseudoalteromonas undina is a marine bacterium isolated from seawater off the coast of Northern California. It was originally classified as Alteromonas undina but was reclassified in 1995 to the genus Pseudoalteromonas.
