= Pseudoalteromonas espejiana =

Scientific classification
- Domain: Bacteria
- Kingdom: Pseudomonadati
- Phylum: Pseudomonadota
- Class: Gammaproteobacteria
- Order: Alteromonadales
- Family: Pseudoalteromonadaceae
- Genus: Pseudoalteromonas
- Species: P. espejiana

Binomial name
- Pseudoalteromonas espejiana (Chan et al., 1978) Gauthier et al., 1995

Species of bacterium

Pseudoalteromonas espejiana is a marine bacterium.
