= Pseudoalteromonas aurantia =

Scientific classification
- Domain: Bacteria
- Kingdom: Pseudomonadati
- Phylum: Pseudomonadota
- Class: Gammaproteobacteria
- Order: Alteromonadales
- Family: Pseudoalteromonadaceae
- Genus: Pseudoalteromonas
- Species: P. aurantia

Binomial name
- Pseudoalteromonas aurantia (Gauthier and Breittmayer 1979); Gauthier et al., 1995

Synonyms
- Alteromonas aurantia Gauthier and Breittmayer, 1979; Pseudomonas aurantia Gauthier et al., 1995

Species of bacterium

Pseudoalteromonas aurantia is an antibacterial-producing marine bacterium commonly found in Mediterranean waters. In 1979, Gauthier and Breittmayer first named it Alteromonas aurantia to include it in the genus Alteromonas that was described seven years earlier, in 1972 by Baumann et al. In 1995, Gauthier et al renamed Alteromonas aurantia to Pseudoalteromonas aurantia to include it in their proposed new genus, Pseudoalteromonas, which they recommended splitting from Alteromonas.
