= Shewanella amazonensis =

Scientific classification
- Domain: Bacteria
- Kingdom: Pseudomonadati
- Phylum: Pseudomonadota
- Class: Gammaproteobacteria
- Order: Alteromonadales
- Family: Shewanellaceae
- Genus: Shewanella
- Species: S. amazonensis

Binomial name
- Shewanella amazonensis Venkateswaran et al. 1998

Type strain
- ATCC 700329, CIP 105786, SB2B

Synonyms
- Shewanella amazoniae

Species of bacterium

Shewanella amazonensis is a gram-negative, facultative anaerobic bacterium from the genus Shewanella which has been isolated from shallow water sediments from the Amazon River. The strain SB2B of Shewanella amazonensis produces hentriacontanonaene.

The species has an optimum growth temperature of 37 °C.
