= Moritella viscosa =

Scientific classification
- Domain: Bacteria
- Kingdom: Pseudomonadati
- Phylum: Pseudomonadota
- Class: Gammaproteobacteria
- Order: Alteromonadales
- Family: Moritellaceae
- Genus: Moritella
- Species: M. viscosa

Binomial name
- Moritella viscosa Benediktsdóttir et al., 2000

Species of bacterium

Moritella viscosa is a species of gram-negative, psychrophilic, halophilic marine bacterium that is best known as the primary causative agent of winter ulcer disease in farmed Atlantic salmon (Salmo salar). The bacterium is distributed throughout the North Atlantic and has been isolated from both cultured and wild marine fishes, particularly in cold-water aquaculture systems. The species was previously called Vibrio viscosa before being reclassified under the genus Moritella.

== Taxonomy ==
Prior to formal description, the bacterium was recognized as an unidentified Vibrio taxon associated with winter ulcer outbreaks in Atlantic salmon. Phenotypic and genotypic analyses demonstrated that these isolates represented a distinct species within the family Vibrionaceae, separate from previously described fish-pathogenic vibrios, and the bacterium was subsequently named Vibrio viscosa.

Comparative studies subsequently showed that V. viscosus was most closely related to Vibrio marinus, a species that had been transferred to the genus Moritella as Moritella marina. 16S rRNA gene sequence analysis showed approximately 99.1% sequence similarity between V. viscosus and M. marina. On the basis of phylogenetic evidence and the taxonomic reassignment of Vibrio marinus, Vibrio viscosus was transferred to the genus Moritella and reclassified as Moritella viscosa in 2000.

== Description ==
Moritella viscosa is a gram-negative, motile, fermentative halophilic bacterium. The bacterium is psychrophilic and grows optimally below 30 °C. Colonies on bovine blood agar containing 2% NaCl are round, translucent, and gray. M. viscosa is catalase- and oxidase positive.

== Role in aquaculture ==
=== Distribution and host range ===
Moritella viscosa is distributed throughout the North atlantic, where it is associated primarily with marine aquaculture in cold-water regions. The species has been isolated from farmed Atlantic salmon in Norway, Scotland, the Faroe islands, Iceland, and Atlantic Canada, where it is recognized as the principal agent of winter ulcer disease.

Although Atlantic salmon is considered the principal host, M. viscosa has also been isolated from rainbow trout, and Atlantic halibut.

=== Pathogenesis ===
Moritella viscosa is transmitted through seawater and infects fish primarily under cold-water conditions. Experimental infection studies indicate that the bacterium initially colonizes the skin and gills. Following invasion, the bacterium can disseminate to internal organs, including the head kidney, spleen, liver, and skeletal muscle, resulting in systemic infection.

The molecular mechanisms responsible for virulence in M. viscosa remain incompletely understood. Several extracellular products contribute to tissue injury, including the metalloprotease MvP1, a vibriolysin with cytotoxic activity toward fish tissues.
