= Pseudoalteromonas donghaensis =

Scientific classification
- Domain: Bacteria
- Kingdom: Pseudomonadati
- Phylum: Pseudomonadota
- Class: Gammaproteobacteria
- Order: Alteromonadales
- Family: Pseudoalteromonadaceae
- Genus: Pseudoalteromonas
- Species: P. donghaensis

Binomial name
- Pseudoalteromonas donghaensis Oh et al., 2011

Species of bacterium

Pseudoalteromonas donghaensis is a marine bacterium which was originally isolated from seawater near South Korea.
