= Pseudoalteromonas aliena =

Scientific classification
- Domain: Bacteria
- Kingdom: Pseudomonadati
- Phylum: Pseudomonadota
- Class: Gammaproteobacteria
- Order: Alteromonadales
- Family: Pseudoalteromonadaceae
- Genus: Pseudoalteromonas
- Species: P. aliena

Binomial name
- Pseudoalteromonas aliena Ivanova et al., 2004

Synonyms
- Pseudomonas aliena Ivanova et al., 2004

Species of bacterium

Pseudoalteromonas aliena is a marine, strictly aerobic, heterotrophic bacterium that has been collected from Amur Bay. P. aliena cells are oxidase and catalase positive.
