= Pseudoalteromonas tetraodonis =

Scientific classification
- Domain: Bacteria
- Kingdom: Pseudomonadati
- Phylum: Pseudomonadota
- Class: Gammaproteobacteria
- Order: Alteromonadales
- Family: Pseudoalteromonadaceae
- Genus: Pseudoalteromonas
- Species: P. tetraodonis

Binomial name
- Pseudoalteromonas tetraodonis (Simidu et al., 1990); Ivanova et al., 2001)

Synonyms
- Alteromonas tetraodonis Pseudoalteromonas haloplanktis subsp. tetraodonis

Species of bacterium

Pseudoalteromonas tetraodonis is a marine bacterium isolated from the surface slime of the puffer fish. It secretes the neurotoxin, tetrodotoxin. It was originally described in 1990 as Alteromonas tetraodonis but was reclassified in 2001 to the genus Pseudoalteromonas. Cells are gram-negative.
