= Pseudoalteromonas maricaloris =

Scientific classification
- Domain: Bacteria
- Kingdom: Pseudomonadati
- Phylum: Pseudomonadota
- Class: Gammaproteobacteria
- Order: Alteromonadales
- Family: Pseudoalteromonadaceae
- Genus: Pseudoalteromonas
- Species: P. maricaloris

Binomial name
- Pseudoalteromonas maricaloris Ivanova et al., 2002

Species of bacterium

Pseudoalteromonas maricaloris is a marine bacterium which was isolated from the sponge Fascaplysinopsis reticulata in the Coral Sea.
