= Pseudoalteromonas haloplanktis =

Scientific classification
- Domain: Bacteria
- Kingdom: Pseudomonadati
- Phylum: Pseudomonadota
- Class: Gammaproteobacteria
- Order: Alteromonadales
- Family: Pseudoalteromonadaceae
- Genus: Pseudoalteromonas
- Species: P. haloplanktis

Binomial name
- Pseudoalteromonas haloplanktis (ZoBell and Upham 1944); Gauthier et al. 1995

Synonyms
- Vibrio haloplanktis ZoBell and Upham 1944; Vibrio marinopraesens ZoBell and Upham 1944; Alteromonas marinopraesens (ZoBell and Upham 1944) Baumann et al. 1972; Alteromonas haloplanktis (ZoBell and Upham 1944) Reichelt and Baumann 1973; Pseudomonas enalia

Species of bacterium

Pseudoalteromonas haloplanktis is a Gram-negative, psychrophilic marine bacterium.
