= C25H35N3O =

The molecular formula C_{25}H_{35}N_{3}O (molar mass: 393.575 g/mol, exact mass: 393.2780 u) may refer to:

- Amesergide (LY-237733)
- Undecylprodigiosin
