= Pseudoalteromonas carrageenovora =

Scientific classification
- Domain: Bacteria
- Kingdom: Pseudomonadati
- Phylum: Pseudomonadota
- Class: Gammaproteobacteria
- Order: Alteromonadales
- Family: Pseudoalteromonadaceae
- Genus: Pseudoalteromonas
- Species: P. carrageenovora

Binomial name
- Pseudoalteromonas carrageenovora (Akagawa-Matsushita et al. 1992); Gauthier et al. 1995

Synonyms
- Alteromonas carrageenovora Akagawa-Matsushita et al. 1992; Pseudomonas carrageenovora

Species of bacterium

Pseudoalteromonas carrageenovora is a marine bacterium. It belongs to the Gammaproteobacteria. The cells are rod-shaped.
