= Shewanella gelidimarina =

Scientific classification
- Domain: Bacteria
- Kingdom: Pseudomonadati
- Phylum: Pseudomonadota
- Class: Gammaproteobacteria
- Order: Alteromonadales
- Family: Shewanellaceae
- Genus: Shewanella
- Species: S. gelidimarina

Binomial name
- Shewanella gelidimarina Bowman et al., 1997

Species of bacterium

Shewanella gelidimarina is a species of bacteria, notable for being an Antarctic species with the ability to produce eicosapentaenoic acid. It grows anaerobically by dissimilatory Fe (III) reduction. Its cells are motile and rod shaped. ACAM 456 is its type strain.
