= Streptomyces variegatus =

Scientific classification
- Domain: Bacteria
- Kingdom: Bacillati
- Phylum: Actinomycetota
- Class: Actinomycetes
- Order: Streptomycetales
- Family: Streptomycetaceae
- Genus: Streptomyces
- Species: S. variegatus

Binomial name
- Streptomyces variegatus Sveshnikova and Timuk 1986

Type strain
- ATCC 43696, CGMCC 4.1797, DSM 41464, IFO 15462, INA T-511, JCM 6930, LMG 20315, NBRC 15462, NRRL B-16380, VKM 846, VKM Ac-846

Species of bacterium

Streptomyces variegatus is a bacterium species from the genus of Streptomyces. Streptomyces variegatus produces prodigiosin.

== See also ==
- List of Streptomyces species
