= Shewanella sediminis =

Scientific classification
- Domain: Bacteria
- Kingdom: Pseudomonadati
- Phylum: Pseudomonadota
- Class: Gammaproteobacteria
- Order: Alteromonadales
- Family: Shewanellaceae
- Genus: Shewanella
- Species: S. sediminis

Binomial name
- Shewanella sediminis Zhao et al. 2005

Species of bacterium

Shewanella sediminis is a hexahydro-1,3,5-trinitro-1,3,5-triazine-degrading bacterium from marine sediment. It is psychrophilic and rod-shaped, with type strain HAW-EB3^{T} (=NCIMB 14036^{T} =DSM 17055^{T}).
