= Prodiginines =

Le paysage

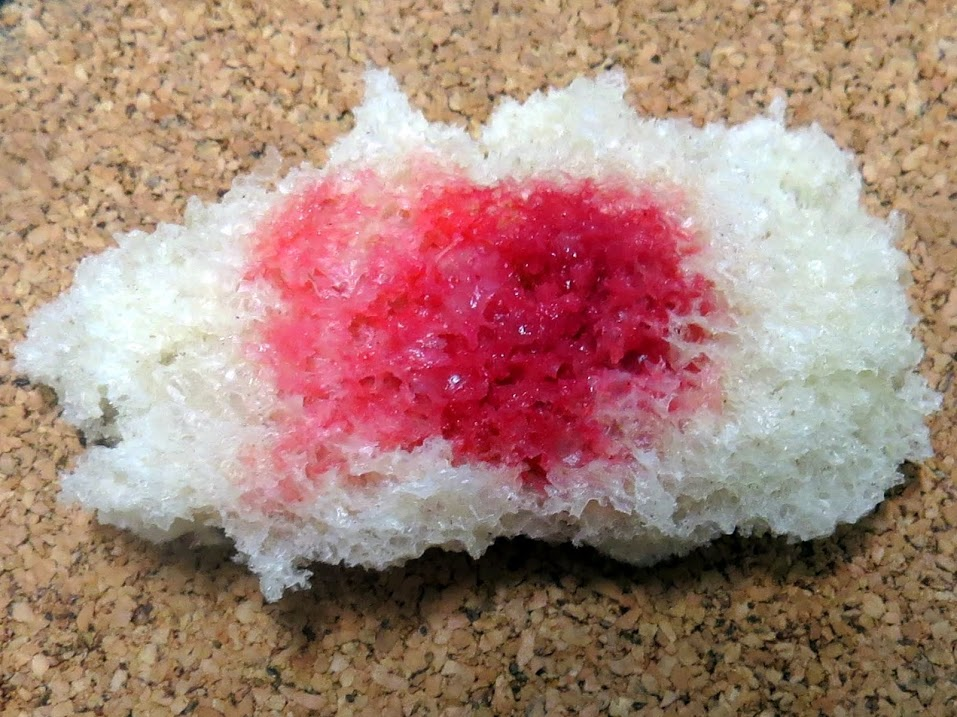
Serratia marcescens growing on bread, showing characteristic colour of the prodiginines

The prodiginines are a family of red tripyrrole dyestuffs produced by Gammaproteobacteria (e.g. Serratia marcescens) as well as some Actinomycetota (e.g. Streptomyces coelicolor). The group is named after prodigiosin (prodiginine) and is biosynthesized through a common set of enzymes. They are interesting due to their history and their varied biological activity.

== Structural types ==
Prodiginine structures

Prodigiosin

Cycloprodigiosin

Cyclononylprodigiosin

Undecylprodigiosin

Butyl-meta-cycloheptylprodiginine

== Natural sources ==
The prodiginines are secondary metabolites originally noted in Serratia species, especially Serratia marcescens. They are also found in Actinomycetes, for example Streptomyces coelicolor and some marine bacteria, including Hahella chejuensis and Pseudoalteromonas denitrificans. Cyclononylprodigiosin was isolated from Actinomadura species.

== Chemistry ==
The Prodiginine family consists of primarily red-pigmented tripyrrole secondary metabolites.

== Production ==
=== Biosynthesis ===
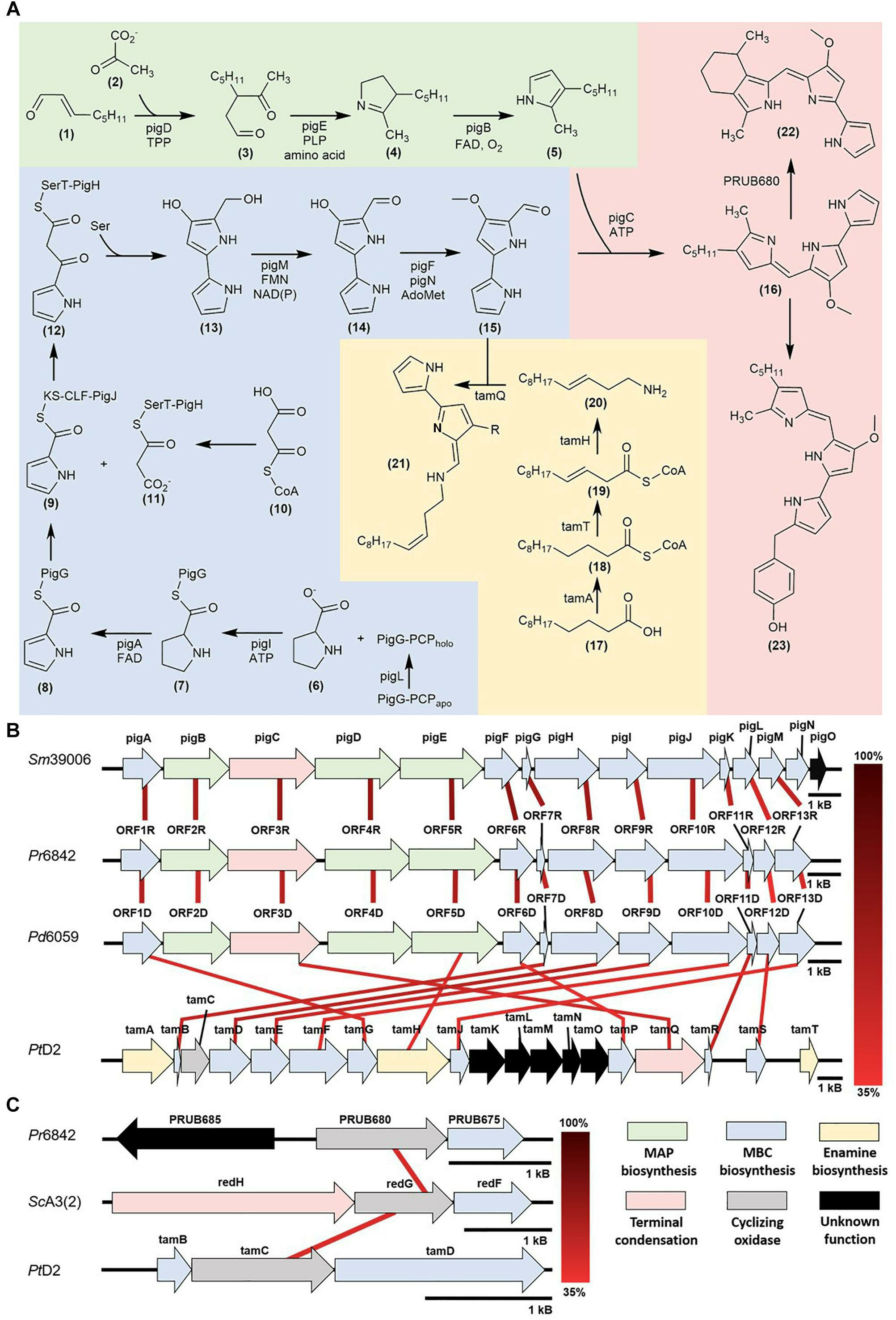
Figure 1: Chemical transformations and gene clusters for prodiginine biosynthetic pathways

Tambjamine aldehyde (compound 15 in Figure 1)

Prodiginine, first extracted from terrestrial Serratia marcescens, consisted of a straight alkyl chain substituent and was named prodigiosin.

The prodiginines are produced from a common intermediate, tambjamine aldehyde (also known as MBC, from its systematic name 4-methoxy-2,2'-bipyrrole-5-carboxaldehyde). This contains two pyrrole rings built from proline and serine as shown in the blue-shaded pathway in Figure 1. The aldehyde is subsequently condensed with a third pyrrole to form prodigiosin (compound 16 in Figure 1), which is then further elaborated to cycloprodigiosin (compound 22 in Figure 1) and the other members of the chemical family.

=== Laboratory ===
Details of the first total synthesis of the parent prodigiosin were published in 1962, confirming the chemical structure. As with the biosynthesis, the key intermediate was MBC. This aldehyde has subsequently been prepared by other methods and used to make many prodiginines.

== Uses ==
Prodigiosin was considered for commercial production in 1823 to dye silk and wool but it has poor stability to light and the advent of synthetic alternatives cut short this application. The group has also been investigated for its pharmaceutical potential as anticancer, immunosuppressant, and antimalarial agents.

== See also ==
- Serratia marcescens, especially for the history of prodigiosin's discovery
