= Shewanella chilikensis =

Scientific classification
- Domain: Bacteria
- Kingdom: Pseudomonadati
- Phylum: Pseudomonadota
- Class: Gammaproteobacteria
- Order: Alteromonadales
- Family: Shewanellaceae
- Genus: Shewanella
- Species: S. chilikensis

Binomial name
- Shewanella chilikensis Sucharita et al. 2009

Type strain
- CCUG 57101, KCTC 22540, NBRC 105217, JC5T

Species of bacterium

Shewanella chilikensis is a Gram-negative, rod-shaped, facultatively anaerobic and motile bacterium from the genus Shewanella which has been isolated from sediments from the Chilika Lagoon in India and marine sponges of Saint Martin's Island of the Bay of Bengal, Bangladesh. Shewanella chilikensis are highly salt tolerant and commonly found in marine environment.

== Biochemical characteristics of Shewanella chilikensis ==
Colony, morphological, physiological, and biochemical characteristics of Shewanella chilikensis are shown in the Table below.

Test type	Test	Characteristics
Colony characters	Size	Small, Medium
Colony characters	Type	Round
Colony characters	Color	Brownish, Pinkish
Colony characters	Shape	Convex
Morphological characters	Shape	Rod
Physiological characters	Motility	+
Physiological characters	Growth at 6.5% NaCl	+
Biochemical characters	Gram's staining	–
Biochemical characters	Oxidase	+
Biochemical characters	Catalase	+
Biochemical characters	Oxidative-Fermentative	Fermentative
Biochemical characters	Motility	+
Biochemical characters	Methyl Red	–
Biochemical characters	Voges-Proskauer	–
Biochemical characters	Indole	–
Biochemical characters	H_{2}S Production	+
Biochemical characters	Urease	+
Biochemical characters	Nitrate reductase	–
Biochemical characters	β-Galactosidase	+
Hydrolysis of	Gelatin	–
Hydrolysis of	Aesculin	+
Hydrolysis of	Casein	+
Hydrolysis of	Tween 40	+
Hydrolysis of	Tween 60	+
Hydrolysis of	Tween 80	+
Acid production from	Glycerol	–
Acid production from	Galactose	–
Acid production from	D-Glucose	+
Acid production from	D-Fructose	+
Acid production from	D-Mannose	+
Acid production from	Mannitol	+
Acid production from	N-Acetylglucosamine	+
Acid production from	Amygdalin	+
Acid production from	Maltose	+
Acid production from	D-Melibiose	+
Acid production from	D-Trehalose	+
Acid production from	Glycogen	+
Acid production from	D-Turanose	+

Note: + = Positive; – =Negative
