= Shewanella baltica =

Scientific classification
- Domain: Bacteria
- Kingdom: Pseudomonadati
- Phylum: Pseudomonadota
- Class: Gammaproteobacteria
- Order: Alteromonadales
- Family: Shewanellaceae
- Genus: Shewanella
- Species: S. baltica

Binomial name
- Shewanella baltica Ziemke et al., 1998

Species of bacterium

Shewanella baltica DSS12 (S. violacea) is a gram-negative bacterium. Its type strain is NCTC 10735. It is of particular importance in fish spoilage.
