= Shewanella corallii =

Scientific classification
- Domain: Bacteria
- Kingdom: Pseudomonadati
- Phylum: Pseudomonadota
- Class: Gammaproteobacteria
- Order: Alteromonadales
- Family: Shewanellaceae
- Genus: Shewanella
- Species: S. corallii

Binomial name
- Shewanella corallii Shnit-Orland et al. 2010

Type strain
- CIP 110229, DSM 21332, fav-2-10-05, LMG 24563

Species of bacterium

Shewanella corallii is a Gram-negative, rod-shaped and motile bacterium from the genus Shewanella which was isolated in March 2005 from a Red Sea coral from the Gulf of Aqaba in the Middle East. In 2016, S. corallii strain A687 was isolated from a pufferfish in Arraial de Cabo, Brazil.
