= Shewanella basaltis =

Scientific classification
- Domain: Bacteria
- Kingdom: Pseudomonadati
- Phylum: Pseudomonadota
- Class: Gammaproteobacteria
- Order: Alteromonadales
- Family: Shewanellaceae
- Genus: Shewanella
- Species: S. basaltis

Binomial name
- Shewanella basaltis Chang et al. 2008

Type strain
- JCM 14937, KCTC 22121, J83

Species of bacterium

Shewanella basaltis is a Gram-negative, rod-shaped and motile bacterium from the genus Shewanella which has been isolated from black sand from Soesoggak off the coast of Jeju Island, South Korea. The species is positive for catalase, oxidase, alkaline phosphatase, and leucine arylamidase. Shewanella basaltis is able to grow in the presence of 5% NaCl. The species is able to grow at a wide range of temperatures (4-45 °C) and pH (5.5-9.5).
