= Shewanella algicola =

Scientific classification
- Domain: Bacteria
- Kingdom: Pseudomonadati
- Phylum: Pseudomonadota
- Class: Gammaproteobacteria
- Order: Alteromonadales
- Family: Shewanellaceae
- Genus: Shewanella
- Species: S. algicola

Binomial name
- Shewanella algicola Kim et al. 2016

Type strain
- JCM 31091, KCTC 23253, ST6

Species of bacterium

Shewanella algicola is a Gram-negative, rod-shaped, aerobic and motile bacterium from the genus Shewanella with a single polar flagella which has been isolated from the alga Sargassum thunbergii from the coast of Jeju Island on Korea.
