= Shewanella fodinae =

Scientific classification
- Domain: Bacteria
- Kingdom: Pseudomonadati
- Phylum: Pseudomonadota
- Class: Gammaproteobacteria
- Order: Alteromonadales
- Family: Shewanellaceae
- Genus: Shewanella
- Species: S. fodinae

Binomial name
- Shewanella fodinae Sravan Kumar et al. 2010

Type strain
- CCUG 57102, KCTC 22506, NBRC 105216, JC15, JC19

Species of bacterium

Shewanella fodinae is a Gram-negative and motile bacterium from the genus Shewanella which has been isolated from a coal mine in India.
