= Pseudoalteromonas =

Scientific classification
- Domain: Bacteria
- Kingdom: Pseudomonadati
- Phylum: Pseudomonadota
- Class: Gammaproteobacteria
- Order: Alteromonadales
- Family: Pseudoalteromonadaceae
- Genus: Pseudoalteromonas; Gauthier et al. 1995

Species
- See text

Genus of bacteria

The swarming motility of Pseudoalteromonas strain SM9913 (wildtype) and the production of its flagella

Pseudoalteromonas is a genus of marine bacteria. In 1995, Gauthier et al proposed Pseudoalteromonas as a new genus to be split from Alteromonas. The Pseudoalteromonas species that were described before 1995 were originally part of the genus Alteromonas, and were reassigned to Pseudoalteromonas based on their rRNA-DNA analysis.

== Species ==
- Pseudoalteromonas agarivorans (Romanenko et al. 2003)
- Pseudoalteromonas aliena (Ivanova et al. 2004)
- Pseudoalteromonas antarctica (Bozal et al. 1997)
- Pseudoalteromonas arctica (Khudary et al. 2008)
- Pseudoalteromonas atlantica (Akagawa-Matsushita et al. 1992)
- Pseudoalteromonas aurantia (Gauthier and Breittmayer 1979)
- Pseudoalteromonas bacteriolytica (Sawabe et al. 1998)
- Pseudoalteromonas byunsanensis (Park et al. 2005)
- Pseudoalteromonas carrageenovora (Akagawa-Matsushita et al. 1992)
- Pseudoalteromonas citrea (Gauthier 1977)
- Pseudoalteromonas denitrificans (Enger et al. 1987)
- Pseudoalteromonas distincta (Romanenko et al. 1995)
- Pseudoalteromonas donghaensis (Oh et al. 2011)
- Pseudoalteromonas elyakovii (Ivanova et al. 1997)
- Pseudoalteromonas espejiana (Chan et al. 1978)
- Pseudoalteromonas flavipulchra (Ivanova et al. 2002)
- Pseudoalteromonas haloplanktis (ZoBell and Upham 1944)
  - Pseudoalteromonas haloplanktis tetraodonis (Simidu et al. 1990)
- Pseudoalteromonas issachenkonii (Ivanova et al. 2002)
- Pseudoalteromonas luteoviolacea (Gauthier 1982)
- Pseudoalteromonas lipolytica (Xu et al. 2010)
- Pseudoalteromonas maricaloris (Ivanova et al. 2002)
- Pseudoalteromonas marina (Nam et al. 2007)
- Pseudoalteromonas mariniglutinosa (ex Berland et al. 1969)
- Pseudoalteromonas nigrifaciens (Baumann et al. 1984)
- Pseudoalteromonas paragorgicola (Ivanova et al. 2002)
- Pseudoalteromonas peptidolytica (Venkateswaran and Dohmoto 2000)
- Pseudoalteromonas phenolica (Isnansetyo and Kamei 2003)
- Pseudoalteromonas piscicida (ex Bein 1954)
- Pseudoalteromonas prydzensis (Bowman 1998)
- Pseudoalteromonas rubra (Gauthier 1976)
- Pseudoalteromonas ruthenica (Ivanova et al. 2002)
- Pseudoalteromonas sagamiensis (Kobayashi et al. 2003)
- Pseudoalteromonas spongiae (Lau et al. 2005)
- Pseudoalteromonas tetraodonis (Simidu et al. 1990)
- Pseudoalteromonas translucida (Ivanova et al. 2002)
- Pseudoalteromonas tunicata (Holmström et al. 1998)
- Pseudoalteromonas ulvae (Egan et al. 2001)
- Pseudoalteromonas undina (Chan et al. 1978)
- Pseudoalteromonas xiamenensis (Zhao et al. 2014)
