= Shewanella frigidimarina =

Scientific classification
- Domain: Bacteria
- Kingdom: Pseudomonadati
- Phylum: Pseudomonadota
- Class: Gammaproteobacteria
- Order: Alteromonadales
- Family: Shewanellaceae
- Genus: Shewanella
- Species: S. frigidimarina'

Binomial name
- Shewanella frigidimarina' Bowman et al., 1997

Species of bacterium

Shewanella frigidimarina is a species of bacteria, notable for being an Antarctic species with the ability to produce eicosapentaenoic acid. It grows anaerobically by dissimilatory Fe (III) reduction. Its cells are motile and rod shaped. ACAM 591 is its type strain.
