= Algicola =

Scientific classification
- Domain: Bacteria
- Kingdom: Pseudomonadati
- Phylum: Pseudomonadota
- Class: Gammaproteobacteria
- Order: Alteromonadales
- Family: Pseudoalteromonadaceae
- Genus: Algicola; Ivanova et al. 2004

Type species
- Algicola bacteriolytica (Sawabe et al. 1998) Ivanova et al. 2004

Genus of bacteria

Algicola is a genus in the phylum Pseudomonadota (Bacteria).

== Etymology ==
The name Algicola derives from Latin alga, a seaweed, and cola or incola, an inhabitant or dweller; Algicola, then, means inhabitant of algae.

== Species ==
The genus contains two species:

- Algicola bacteriolytica Sawabe et al. 1998. Ivanova et al. 2004 (type species of the genus); bacterium, rod or staff and lytica (from Greek lutikē, able to loosen, able to dissolve, to give bacteriolytica, bacteria-dissolving
- Algicola sagamiensis Kobayashi et al. 2003, Nam et al. 2007, sagamiensis, referring to Sagami Bay, the place of isolation
