= ATCvet code QI10 =

Veterinary medical products classification subgroup

ATCvet code QI10 Immunologicals for Pisces is a therapeutic subgroup of the Anatomical Therapeutic Chemical Classification System for veterinary medicinal products, a system of alphanumeric codes developed by the World Health Organization (WHO) for the classification of drugs and other medical products for veterinary use. Subgroup QI10 is part of the anatomical group QI Immunologicals.

National versions of the ATC classification may include additional codes not present in this list, which follows the WHO version.

== QI10A Atlantic salmon ==
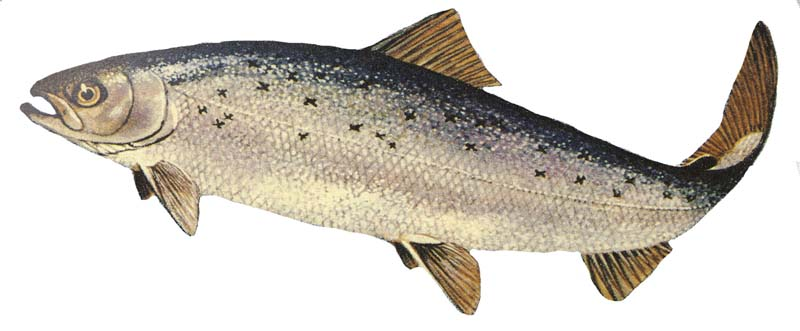

=== QI10AA Inactivated viral vaccines ===
QI10AA01 Salmon pancreas disease virus (SPD)
QI10AA02 Salmon pancreas disease (SPD), protein coding plasmid

=== QI10AB Inactivated bacterial vaccines (including mycoplasma, toxoid and chlamydia) ===
QI10AB01 Aeromonas
QI10AB02 Aeromonas + vibrio
QI10AB03 Aeromonas + moritella + vibrio
QI10AB04 Yersinia

=== QI10AC Inactivated bacterial vaccines and antisera ===
Empty group

=== QI10AD Live viral vaccines ===
Empty group

=== QI10AE Live bacterial vaccines ===
Empty group

=== QI10AF Live bacterial and viral vaccines ===
Empty group

=== QI10AG Live and inactivated bacterial vaccines ===
Empty group

=== QI10AH Live and inactivated viral vaccines ===
Empty group

=== QI10AI Live viral and inactivated bacterial vaccines ===
Empty group

=== QI10AJ Live and inactivated viral and bacterial vaccines ===
Empty group

=== QI10AK Inactivated viral and live bacterial vaccines ===
Empty group

=== QI10AL Inactivated viral and inactivated bacterial vaccines ===
QI10AL01 Infectious pancreatic necrosis (IPN) virus + aeromonas + vibrio
QI10AL02 Infectious pancreatic necrosis (IPN) virus + aeromonas + moritella + vibrio
QI10AL03 Infectious pancreatic necrosis (IPN) virus + aeromonas
QI10AL04 Infectious pancreatic necrosis (IPN) virus + infectious salmon anaemia (ISA) virus + aeromonas + moritella + vibrio
QI10AL05 Infectious pancreatic necrosis (IPN) virus + pancreatic disease (SPD) virus + aeromonas + moritella + vibrio

=== QI10AM Antisera, immunoglobulin preparations, and antitoxins ===
Empty group

=== QI10AN Live parasitic vaccines ===
Empty group

=== QI10AO Inactivated parasitic vaccines ===
Empty group

=== QI10AP Live fungal vaccines ===
Empty group

=== QI10AQ Inactivated fungal vaccines ===
Empty group

=== QI10AR In vivo diagnostic preparations ===
Empty group

=== QI10AS Allergens ===
Empty group

=== QI10AU Other live vaccines ===
Empty group

=== QI10AV Other inactivated vaccines ===
Empty group

=== QI10AX Other immunologicals ===
Empty group

== QI10B Rainbow trout ==
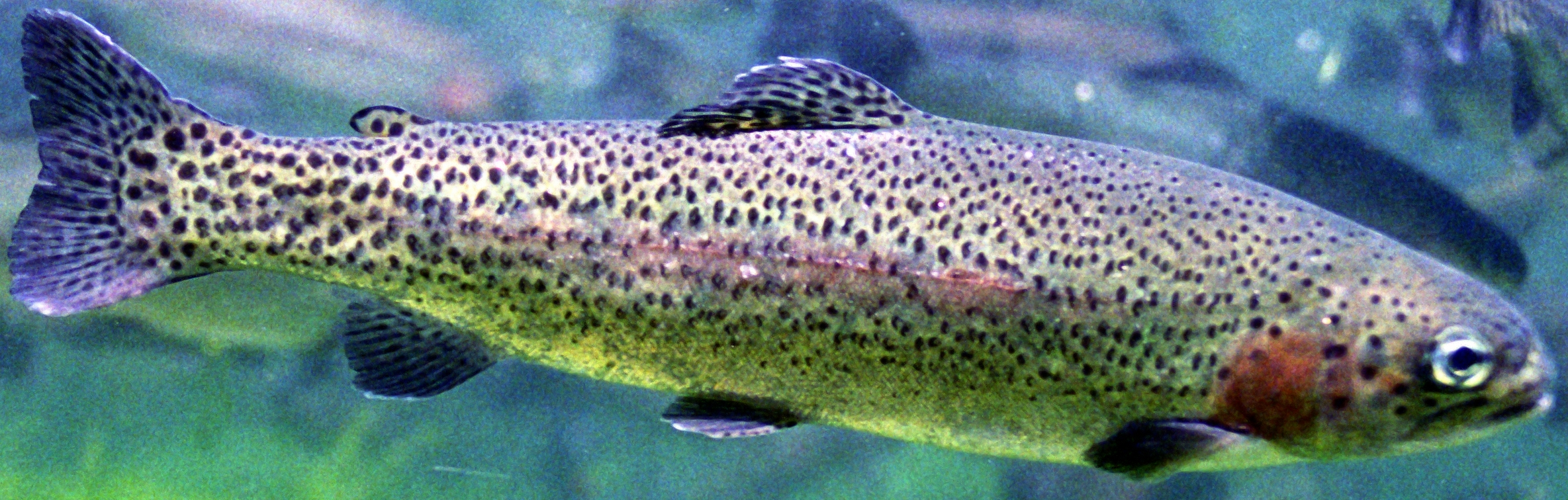

=== QI10BA Inactivated viral vaccines ===
Empty group

=== QI10BB Inactivated bacterial vaccines (including mycoplasma, toxoid and chlamydia) ===
QI10BB01 Vibrio
QI10BB02 Aeromonas + vibrio
QI10BB03 Yersinia
QI10BB04 Aeromonas + moritella + vibrio + flavobacterium

=== QI10BC Inactivated bacterial vaccines and antisera ===
Empty group

=== QI10BD Live viral vaccines ===
Empty group

=== QI10BE Live bacterial vaccines ===
Empty group

=== QI10BF Live bacterial and viral vaccines ===
Empty group

=== QI10BG Live and inactivated bacterial vaccines ===
Empty group

=== QI10BH Live and inactivated viral vaccines ===
Empty group

=== QI10BI Live viral and inactivated bacterial vaccines ===
Empty group

=== QI10BJ Live and inactivated viral and bacterial vaccines ===
Empty group

=== QI10BK Inactivated viral and live bacterial vaccines ===
Empty group

=== QI10BL Inactivated viral and inactivated bacterial vaccines ===
Empty group

=== QI10BM Antisera, immunoglobulin preparations, and antitoxins ===
Empty group

=== QI10BN Live parasitic vaccines ===
Empty group

=== QI10BO Inactivated parasitic vaccines ===
Empty group

=== QI10BP Live fungal vaccines ===
Empty group

=== QI10BQ Inactivated fungal vaccines ===
Empty group

=== QI10BR In vivo diagnostic preparations ===
Empty group

=== QI10BS Allergens ===
Empty group

=== QI10BU Other live vaccines ===
Empty group

=== QI10BV Other inactivated vaccines ===
Empty group

=== QI10BX Other immunologicals ===
Empty group

== QI10C Carp ==
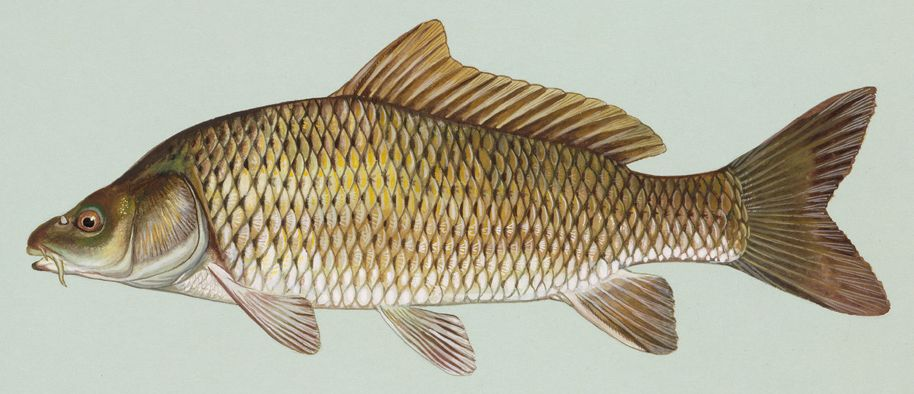

Empty group

== QI10D Turbot ==
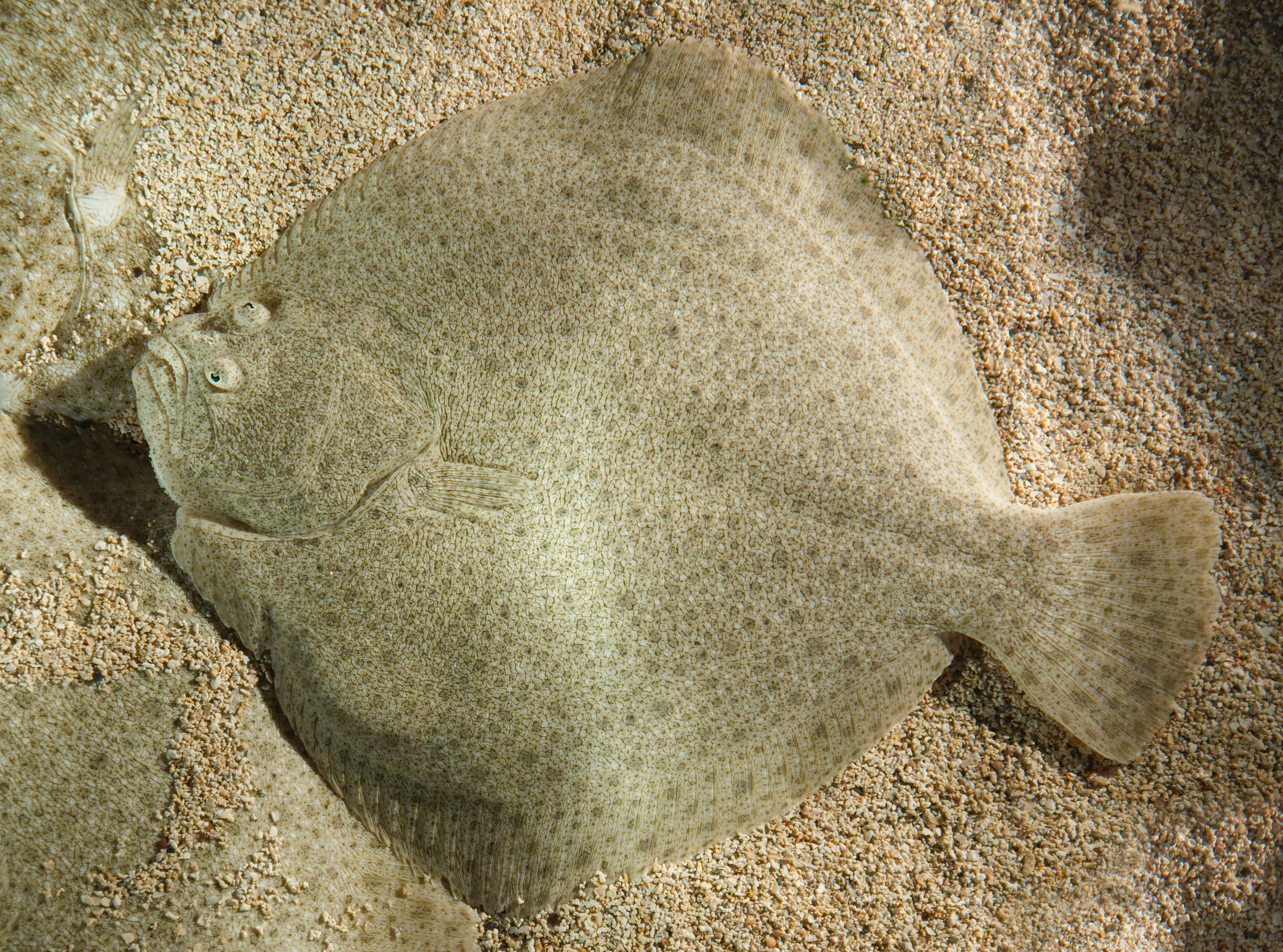

Empty group

== QI10E Ornamental fish ==
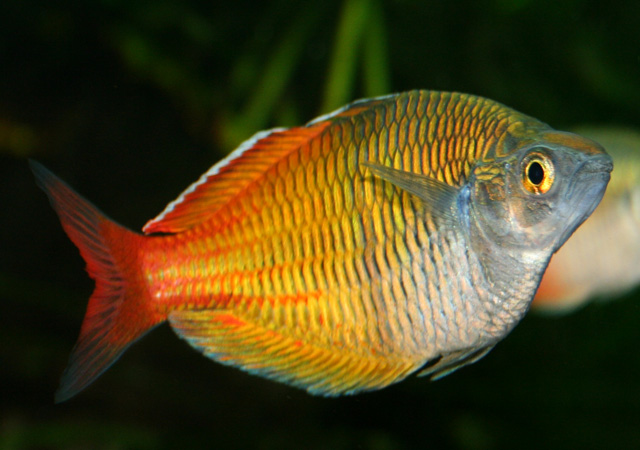

Empty group

== QI10F Atlantic cod ==
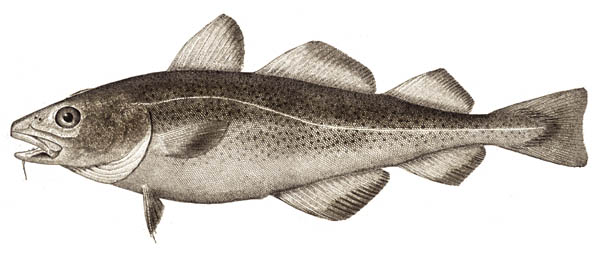

=== QI10FB Inactivated bacterial vaccines (including mycoplasma, toxoid and chlamydia) ===
QI10FB01 Vibrio
QI10FB02 Aeromonas + vibrio

== QI10X Pisces, others ==
Empty group
