= Shewanella denitrificans =

Scientific classification
- Domain: Bacteria
- Kingdom: Pseudomonadati
- Phylum: Pseudomonadota
- Class: Gammaproteobacteria
- Order: Alteromonadales
- Family: Shewanellaceae
- Genus: Shewanella
- Species: S. denitrificans

Binomial name
- Shewanella denitrificans Brettar et al. 2002

Type strain
- ATCC BAA-1090, CIP 107825, DSM 15013, LMG 21692, OS217

Species of bacterium

Shewanella denitrificans is a gram-negative bacterium from the genus Shewanella which has been isolated from water from the Gotland Deep from the Baltic Sea.
