= Pseudoalteromonas tunicata =

Scientific classification
- Domain: Bacteria
- Kingdom: Pseudomonadati
- Phylum: Pseudomonadota
- Class: Gammaproteobacteria
- Order: Alteromonadales
- Family: Pseudoalteromonadaceae
- Genus: Pseudoalteromonas
- Species: P. tunicata

Binomial name
- Pseudoalteromonas tunicata Holmström et al., 1998

Species of bacterium

Pseudoalteromonas tunicata is species of gram-negative marine bacterium isolated from the tunicate Ciona intestinalis.
