= Streptomyces hiroshimensis =

Scientific classification
- Domain: Bacteria
- Kingdom: Bacillati
- Phylum: Actinomycetota
- Class: Actinomycetes
- Order: Streptomycetales
- Family: Streptomycetaceae
- Genus: Streptomyces
- Species: S. hiroshimensis

Binomial name
- Streptomyces hiroshimensis (Shinobu 1955) Witt and Stackebrandt 1991

Type strain
- 201, ATCC 19772, BCRC 13375, CBS 510.68, CCRC 13375, CECT 3261, CGMCC 4.1948, CIP 108157, DSM 40037, DSMZ 40037, ETH 24428, ETH 24479, HUT-6033, IFO 12785, IFO 3720, IFO 3839, IMET 43546, IPV 2015, IPV 2024, ISP 5037, JCM 4098, JCM 4586, KCC S-0098, KCC S-0586, KCCM 40081, KCCS- 0098, KCCS-0586, KCTC 9781, NBRC 12785, NBRC 3720, NBRC 3839, NCIB 9838, NCIMB 9838, NRRL B-1823, NRRL B-5484, NRRL B-B-5484, NRRL-ISP 5037, OEU 201, RIA 1052, RIA 592, Shinobu 201, UNIQEM 158, VKM Ac-902

Synonyms
- "Actinomyces biverticillatus" Preobrazhenskaya 1957; "Actinomyces rectiverticillatus" Krassilnikov and Yuan 1965; Streptomyces aureoversales (Locci et al. 1969) Witt and Stackebrandt 1991; Streptomyces aureoversilis corrig. (Locci et al. 1969) Witt and Stackebrandt 1991; Streptomyces baldaccii corrig. (Farina and Locci 1966) Witt and Stackebrandt 1991; Streptomyces baldacii (Farina and Locci 1966) Witt and Stackebrandt 1991; Streptomyces biverticillatus (Preobrazhenskaya 1957) Witt and Stackebrandt 1991; "Streptomyces fervens" De Boer et al. 1960; Streptomyces fervens (De Boer et al. 1960) Witt and Stackebrandt 1991; Streptomyces fervens subsp. melrosporus (Mason et al. 1965) Witt and Stackebrandt 1991; "Streptomyces hiroshimensis" Shinobu 1955; Streptomyces rectiverticillatus (Krassilnikov and Yuan 1965) Witt and Stackebrandt 1991; "Streptomyces roseoverticillatus" Shinobu 1956; Streptomyces roseoverticillatus (Shinobu 1956) Witt and Stackebrandt 1991; Streptomyces salmonis (Baldacci et al. 1966) Witt and Stackebrandt 1991; Streptomyces spitsbergensis Wieczorek et al. 1993; Streptoverticillium aureoversile corrig. Locci et al. 1969 (Approved Lists 1980); Streptoverticillium aureoversales Locci et al. 1969 (Approved Lists 1980); Streptoverticillium baldaccii Farina and Locci 1966 (Approved Lists 1980); Streptoverticillium biverticillatum (Preobrazhenskaya 1957) Farina and Locci 1966 (Approved Lists 1980); Streptoverticillium fervens (De Boer et al. 1960) Locci et al. 1969 (Approved Lists 1980); Streptoverticillium fervens subsp. melrosporus Mason et al. 1965 (Approved Lists 1980); Streptoverticillium hiroshimense (Shinobu 1955) Farina and Locci 1966 (Approved Lists 1980); Streptoverticillium rectiverticillatum (Krassilnikov and Yuan 1965) Locci et al. 1969 (Approved Lists 1980); Streptoverticillium roseoverticillatum (Shinobu 1956) Farina and Locci 1966 (Approved Lists 1980); "Streptoverticillium salmonicida" Baldacci et al. 1966; Streptoverticillium salmonis (Baldacci et al. 1966) Locci et al. 1969 (Approved Lists 1980); "Verticillomyces hiroshimensis" (Shinobu 1955) Shinobu 1965

Species of bacterium

Streptomyces hiroshimensis is a bacterium species from the genus of Streptomyces which has been isolated from soil. Streptomyces hiroshimensis produces the red pigment prodigiosin.

== See also ==
- List of Streptomyces species
