= Shewanella haliotis =

Scientific classification
- Domain: Bacteria
- Kingdom: Pseudomonadati
- Phylum: Pseudomonadota
- Class: Gammaproteobacteria
- Order: Alteromonadales
- Family: Shewanellaceae
- Genus: Shewanella
- Species: S. haliotis

Binomial name
- Shewanella haliotis Kim et al., 2007

Species of bacterium

Shewanella haliotis, a species of rod-shaped, Gram-negative, facultatively anaerobic bacteria, was first isolated from the gut microflora of abalone (large edible sea snails) collected from the ocean near Yeosu, South Korea, by Kim et al. in 2007. Further studies showed the cells to be catalase- and oxidase-positive. The species epithet haliotis is a reference to the genus name of abalone, Haliotis.

The genus Shewanella had been previously named in 1985 by MacDonell and Colwell in honor of Scottish microbiologist James M. Shewan, for his work in fisheries microbiology.

== Characteristics ==
A sample colony of S. haliotis was isolated from an abalone. It was pink-orange in colour, grew at 42 °C in the pH range 5–11 (with optimum pH being 7). It was found to be positive for malate as a carbon source, and negative for mannose and glucose use. The strain was resistant to both penicillin and vancomycin.

== Human pathologies ==
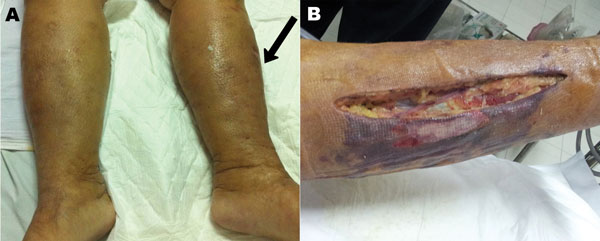
S. haliotis severe soft tissue infection of woman in Thailand, 2012: The patient sought treatment for painful erythematous swelling of the left leg. A- Arrow indicates affected area, B- Postsurgical fasciotomy wound with necrotic tissue

The route of Shewanella infection is associated with direct contact with the organism through seawater or ingestion of raw seafood, causing severe soft tissue infection. One case of infection was found to be susceptible to ciprofloxacin (0.25 mg/L), piperacillin-tazobactam (1.0 mg/L), ceftriaxone (1.0 mg/L), and meropenem (0.38 mg/L). The patient had fever for the first 2 days of hospitalization. After 2 weeks of treatment, the antimicrobial drug was switched to oral ciprofloxacin; treatment was continued after dressing and debridement of the fasciotomy wound.
