= Shewanella violacea =

Scientific classification
- Domain: Bacteria
- Kingdom: Pseudomonadati
- Phylum: Pseudomonadota
- Class: Gammaproteobacteria
- Order: Alteromonadales
- Family: Shewanellaceae
- Genus: Shewanella
- Species: S. violacea

Binomial name
- Shewanella violacea Nogi, Kato & Horikoshi, 1999

Species of bacterium

Shewanella violacea DSS12 (S. violacea) is a gram-negative bacterium located in marine sediment in the Ryukyu Trench at a depth of 5,110m. The first description of this organism was published in 1998 by Japanese microbiologists Yuichi Nogi, Chiaki Kato, and Koki Horikoshi, who named the species after its violet appearance when it is grown on Marine Agar 2216 Plates.

Shewanella violacea is a motile rod-shaped bacterium with flagella. It is a facultative anaerobic organism and considered an extremophile due to its optimal growing conditions at 8°C and 30 MPa. Researchers are evaluating this species to better understand the specific mechanisms S. violacea uses in order to thrive in its unusually cold and high-pressure environment.

== Taxonomy ==
Shewanella violacea is a member of the Shewanella genus. Recent evaluation of the Shewanella phylogeny has led to a division of this genus into two categories: Group 1 and Group 2. These categories were created from an evaluation of the 16S rRNA sequences as well as a comparison of membrane lipid compositions. Group 1 Shewanella species are mostly extremophiles while Group 2 Shewanella species are mostly mesophiles. S. violacea is a member of Group 1 Shewanella due to specific genetic adaptations that have enabled the bacteria to thrive in extremely low temperatures and high pressures. Specifically, Group 1 species contain a notably higher percentage of polyunsaturated fatty acids integrated in their membranes.

== Location ==
Samples of S. violacea have been collected using the SHINKAI 6500 System, a crewed submersible operated by the Japan Marine Science and Technology Center. Samples have been collected from the Ryukyu Trench at a depth of 5,110 m. The bacteria are found in the topmost layer of the sediment in this marine environment.

== Structure and metabolism ==
=== Genome ===
The complete genome of S. violacea was successfully sequenced in 2010 using the Sanger method. S. violacea contains 4,962,103 base pairs. It has 4,346 protein genes and 169 RNA genes. The bacterium contains a single chromosome and no known plasmids. The G+C content is 44.7%. The complete genome is accessible online as published by the National Center for Biotechnology Information (see external links).

=== Membrane composition ===
Shewanella violacea has an abnormally high percent of polyunsaturated fatty acids (PUFA) integrated into its phospholipids. In Shewanella violacea 14% of its fatty acids are eicosapentaenoic acids (EPA) which are a specific type of polyunsaturated fatty acid also known as 20:5ω3. Increased PUFA concentrations decrease the membrane fluidity and help the bacterium thrive in the cold temperatures. The exact function of the unusual lipid composition found in S. violacea and other members of Group 1 Shewanella species is not yet fully understood. Nevertheless, high EPA levels in S. violacea have been correlated with greater rates of cell division in high pressures as well as in low temperatures.

=== Ideal growth conditions ===
Shewanella violacea is an obligate psychrophile (cryophile). Its optimum growth temperature is 8°C. It is not able to grow or reproduce at 30°C. S. violacea is a facultative piezophile (barophile) which means that it is able to thrive in high pressure conditions. S. violacea is able to grow in pressure conditions ranging from 0.1 to 70 MPa (3). Its ideal pressure is 30 MPa.

=== Maintenance of respiratory system at high pressures ===
Unlike many other Shewanella species, S. violacea has very few terminal reductases for anaerobic respiration, c-type cytochromes and no Fe(III) reduction outer membrane proteins involved in respiration. A pressure related operon is believed to play an integral role in the regulation of the respiratory system in S. violacea. Specifically, researchers are evaluating the significance of pressure regulated cytochromes. Cytochromes are hemeproteins involved in the generation of ATP via electron transport. S. violacea contains three main types of cytochromes. The first, CA is expressed at all viable pressures. The second, CB, is only expressed at low pressures. The third, a d-type cytochrome is expressed only when the cells are grown under high pressure. The d-type cytochrome in S. violacea is thus a critical means for the respiratory system to remain active at high pressures.
