= Shewanella livingstonensis =

Scientific classification
- Domain: Bacteria
- Kingdom: Pseudomonadati
- Phylum: Pseudomonadota
- Class: Gammaproteobacteria
- Order: Alteromonadales
- Family: Shewanellaceae
- Genus: Shewanella
- Species: S. livingstonensis

Binomial name
- Shewanella livingstonensis Bozal et al., 2002

Species of bacterium

Shewanella livingstonensis is a species of bacteria. Its cells are psychrophilic, gram-negative, rod-shaped, facultatively anaerobic and motile by means of a single polar flagellum. Its type strain is LMG 19866^{T}.
