= Shewanella algidipiscicola =

Scientific classification
- Domain: Bacteria
- Kingdom: Pseudomonadati
- Phylum: Pseudomonadota
- Class: Gammaproteobacteria
- Order: Alteromonadales
- Family: Shewanellaceae
- Genus: Shewanella
- Species: S. algidipiscicola

Binomial name
- Shewanella algidipiscicola Satomi et al. 2007

Type strain
- LMG 23746, NBRC 102032, S13

Species of bacterium

Shewanella algidipiscicola is a Gram-negative and psychrotolerant bacterium from the genus Shewanella which has been isolated from a fish from the Baltic Sea off Denmark.
