= Shewanella woodyi =

Scientific classification
- Domain: Bacteria
- Kingdom: Pseudomonadati
- Phylum: Pseudomonadota
- Class: Gammaproteobacteria
- Order: Alteromonadales
- Family: Shewanellaceae
- Genus: Shewanella
- Species: S. woodyi

Binomial name
- Shewanella woodyi Makemson et al. 1997

Species of bacterium

Shewanella woodyi is a species of exclusively respiratory luminous bacterium. It is non-fermentative, with type strain ATCC 51908 (= MS32). Cells stain Gram-negative.
