= Shewanella abyssi =

Scientific classification
- Domain: Bacteria
- Kingdom: Pseudomonadati
- Phylum: Pseudomonadota
- Class: Gammaproteobacteria
- Order: Alteromonadales
- Family: Shewanellaceae
- Genus: Shewanella
- Species: S. abyssi

Binomial name
- Shewanella abyssi Miyazaki et al. 2006

Type strain
- c941, CIP 109339, DSM 17171, JCM 13041

Synonyms
- Shewanella sedimentalis

Species of bacterium

Shewanella abyssi is a bacterium from the genus Shewanella which has been isolated from deep-sea sediments from the Suruga Bay on Japan.
