= Shewanella dokdonensis =

Scientific classification
- Domain: Bacteria
- Kingdom: Pseudomonadati
- Phylum: Pseudomonadota
- Class: Gammaproteobacteria
- Order: Alteromonadales
- Family: Shewanellaceae
- Genus: Shewanella
- Species: S. dokdonensis

Binomial name
- Shewanella dokdonensis Xu et al. 2005

Type strain
- DSM 23626, KCTC 22898, UDC329

Species of bacterium

Shewanella dokdonensis is a Gram-negative, facultatively anaerobic, non-spore-forming and motile bacterium from the genus Shewanella which has been isolated from seawater from the Sea of Japan.
