= Shewanella decolorationis =

Scientific classification
- Domain: Bacteria
- Kingdom: Pseudomonadati
- Phylum: Pseudomonadota
- Class: Gammaproteobacteria
- Order: Alteromonadales
- Family: Shewanellaceae
- Genus: Shewanella
- Species: S. decolorationis

Binomial name
- Shewanella decolorationis Xu et al. 2005

Species of bacterium

Shewanella decolorationis is a gram-negative, dye-decolorizing bacterium first isolated from activated sludge of a waste-water treatment plant. It is motile by means of a single polar flagellum. The type strain is S12^{T} (=CCTCC M 203093^{T} =IAM 15094^{T}). Its genome has been sequenced.
