= Shewanella gaetbuli =

Scientific classification
- Domain: Bacteria
- Kingdom: Pseudomonadati
- Phylum: Pseudomonadota
- Class: Gammaproteobacteria
- Order: Alteromonadales
- Family: Shewanellaceae
- Genus: Shewanella
- Species: S. gaetbuli

Binomial name
- Shewanella gaetbuli Yoon et al. 2004

Type strain
- JCM 11814, KCCM 41648, TF-27

Species of bacterium

Shewanella gaetbuli is a Gram-negative, non-spore-forming, rod-shaped and motile bacterium from the genus Shewanella which has been isolated from tidal flat from Korea.
