= Shewanella arctica =

Scientific classification
- Domain: Bacteria
- Kingdom: Pseudomonadati
- Phylum: Pseudomonadota
- Class: Gammaproteobacteria
- Order: Alteromonadales
- Family: Shewanellaceae
- Genus: Shewanella
- Species: S. arctica

Binomial name
- Shewanella arctica Kim et al. 2012

Type strain
- JCM 16723, KCTC 23109, IR 12, IR 26

Species of bacterium

Shewanella arctica is a Gram-negative and anaerobic bacterium from the genus Shewanella which has been isolated from sediment from the Arctic.
