= Shewanella atlantica =

Scientific classification
- Domain: Bacteria
- Kingdom: Pseudomonadati
- Phylum: Pseudomonadota
- Class: Gammaproteobacteria
- Order: Alteromonadales
- Family: Shewanellaceae
- Genus: Shewanella
- Species: S. atlantica

Binomial name
- Shewanella atlantica Zhao et al. 2007

Type strain
- CCUG 54554, NCIMB 14239, HAW-EB5

Species of bacterium

Shewanella atlantica is a psychrophilic bacterium from the genus Shewanella which has been isolated from marine sediment from the Emerald Basin from the Atlantic Ocean near Canada (not to be confused with the other Emerald Basin which lies south of New Zealand in the Southern Ocean). Shewanella atlantica can degrade hexahydro-1,3,5-trinitro-1,3,5-triazine.
