= Shewanella aquimarina =

Scientific classification
- Domain: Bacteria
- Kingdom: Pseudomonadati
- Phylum: Pseudomonadota
- Class: Gammaproteobacteria
- Order: Alteromonadales
- Family: Shewanellaceae
- Genus: Shewanella
- Species: S. aquimarina

Binomial name
- Shewanella aquimarina Yoon et al. 2004

Type strain
- JCM 12193, KCCM 41821, SW-120

Species of bacterium

Shewanella aquimarina is a slightly halophilic, Gram-negative, non-spore-forming, rod-shaped and motile bacterium from the genus Shewanella which has been isolated from water from the Yellow Sea in Korea.
