= Pseudoalteromonas denitrificans =

Scientific classification
- Domain: Bacteria
- Kingdom: Pseudomonadati
- Phylum: Pseudomonadota
- Class: Gammaproteobacteria
- Order: Alteromonadales
- Family: Pseudoalteromonadaceae
- Genus: Pseudoalteromonas
- Species: P. denitrificans

Binomial name
- Pseudoalteromonas denitrificans (Enger et al., 1987); Gauthier et al., 1995

Synonyms
- Alteromonas denitrificans Enger et al., 1987

Species of bacterium

Pseudoalteromonas denitrificans is a species of gram-negative, marine bacterium.
