= Shewanella aestuarii =

Scientific classification
- Domain: Bacteria
- Kingdom: Pseudomonadati
- Phylum: Pseudomonadota
- Class: Gammaproteobacteria
- Order: Alteromonadales
- Family: Shewanellaceae
- Genus: Shewanella
- Species: S. aestuarii

Binomial name
- Shewanella aestuarii Park et al. 2013

Type strain
- B11, DSM 19476, KCTC 22051, LMG 26132, Roh B11

Species of bacterium

Shewanella aestuarii is a Gram-negative, non-spore-forming, facultatively anaerobic, rod-shaped and motile bacterium with a polar flagellum from the genus Shewanella which has been isolated from tidal flat from the Suncheon bay on Korea.
