= Shewanella canadensis =

Scientific classification
- Domain: Bacteria
- Kingdom: Pseudomonadati
- Phylum: Pseudomonadota
- Class: Gammaproteobacteria
- Order: Alteromonadales
- Family: Shewanellaceae
- Genus: Shewanella
- Species: S. canadensis

Binomial name
- Shewanella canadensis Zhao et al. 2007

Type strain
- CCUG 54553, NCIMB 14238, HAW-EB2

Species of bacterium

Shewanella canadensis is a psychrophilic, gram-negative bacterium from the genus Shewanella which has been isolated from sediments from the Atlantic Ocean. The species requires 1% NaCl for optimum growth, although some strains appear to tolerate NaCl better than others.
