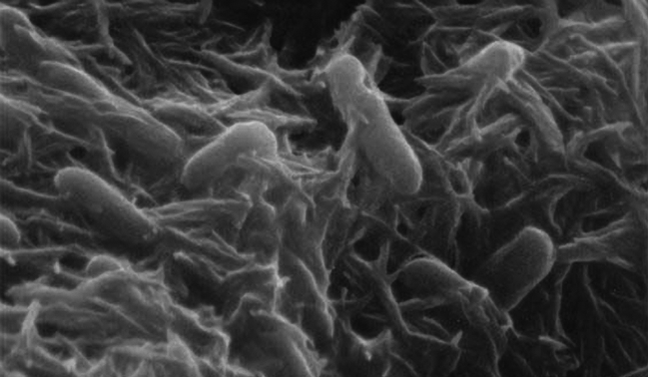
- Shewanella oneidensis

Scientific classification
- Domain: Bacteria
- Kingdom: Pseudomonadati
- Phylum: Pseudomonadota
- Class: Gammaproteobacteria
- Order: Alteromonadales
- Family: Shewanellaceae; Ivanova et al. 2004
- Genus: Shewanella; MacDonell and Colwell 1985

Type species
- Shewanella putrefaciens

Species
- S. abyssi; S. aestuarii; S. algae; S. algicola; S. algidipiscicola; S. amazonensis; S. aquimarina; S. arctica; S. atlantica; S. baltica; S. basaltis; S. benthica; S. canadensis; S. chilikensis; S. colwelliana; S. corallii; S. decolorationis; S. denitrificans; S. dokdonensis; S. donghaensis; S. fidelis; S. fodinae; S. frigidimarina; S. gaetbuli; S. gelidimarina; S. glacialipiscicola; S. gelidii; S. hafniensis; S. halifaxensis; S. haliotis; S. hanedai; S. indica; S. inventionis; S. irciniae; S. japonica; S. kaireitica; S. litorisediminis; S. livingstonensis; S. loihica; S. mangrovi; S. marina; S. marinintestina; S. marisflavi; S. morhuae; S. olleyana; S. oneidensis; S. oshoroensis; S. piezotolerans; S. pacifica; S. pealeana; S. piezotolerans; S. pneumatophori; S. profunda; S. psychrophila; S. putrefaciens; S. sairae; S. schegeliana; S. sediminis; S. seohaensis; S. spongiae; S. surugensis; S. upenei; S. vesiculosa; S. violacea; S. waksmanii; S. woodyi; S. xiamenensis

= Shewanella =

Genus of bacteria

Shewanella is the sole genus included in the marine bacteria family Shewanellaceae. Some species within it were formerly classed as Alteromonas. Shewanella consists of facultatively anaerobic Gram-negative rods, most of which are found in extreme aquatic habitats where the temperature is very low and the pressure is very high. Shewanella bacteria are a normal component of the surface flora of fish and are implicated in fish spoilage. Shewanella chilikensis is a species of the genus Shewanella commonly found in the marine sponges of Saint Martin's Island of the Bay of Bengal, Bangladesh.

Shewanella oneidensis MR-1 is a widely used laboratory model to study anaerobic respiration of metals and other anaerobic extracellular electron acceptors, and for teaching about microbial electrogenesis and microbial fuel cells.

== Biochemical characteristics of Shewanella species ==
Colony, morphological, physiological, and biochemical characteristics of Shewanella species are shown in the Table below.

Test type	Test	Characteristics
Colony characters	Size	Small, Medium
Colony characters	Type	Round
Colony characters	Color	Brownish, Pinkish
Colony characters	Shape	Convex
Morphological characters	Shape	Rod
Physiological characters	Motility	+
Physiological characters	Growth at 6.5% NaCl	+
Biochemical characters	Gram's staining	–
Biochemical characters	Oxidase	+
Biochemical characters	Catalase	+
Biochemical characters	Oxidative-Fermentative	Fermentative
Biochemical characters	Motility	+
Biochemical characters	Methyl Red	–
Biochemical characters	Voges-Proskauer	–
Biochemical characters	Indole	–
Biochemical characters	H_{2}S Production	+
Biochemical characters	Urease	+
Biochemical characters	Nitrate reductase	–
Biochemical characters	β-Galactosidase	+
Hydrolysis of	Gelatin	–
Hydrolysis of	Aesculin	+
Hydrolysis of	Casein	+
Hydrolysis of	Tween 40	+
Hydrolysis of	Tween 60	+
Hydrolysis of	Tween 80	+
Acid production from	Glycerol	–
Acid production from	Galactose	–
Acid production from	D-Glucose	+
Acid production from	D-Fructose	+
Acid production from	D-Mannose	+
Acid production from	Mannitol	+
Acid production from	N-Acetylglucosamine	+
Acid production from	Amygdalin	+
Acid production from	Maltose	+
Acid production from	D-Melibiose	+
Acid production from	D-Trehalose	+
Acid production from	Glycogen	+
Acid production from	D-Turanose	+

Note: + = Positive; – =Negative

== Metabolism ==
Currently known Shewanella species are heterotrophic facultative anaerobes. In the absence of oxygen, members of this genus possess capabilities allowing the use of a variety of other electron acceptors for respiration. These include thiosulfate, sulfite, or elemental sulfur, as well as fumarate. Marine species have demonstrated an ability to use arsenic as an electron acceptor as well. Some members of this species, most notably Shewanella oneidensis, have the ability to respire through a wide range of metal species, including manganese, chromium, uranium, and iron. Reduction of iron and manganese through Shewanella respiration has been shown to involve extracellular electron transfer through the employment of bacterial nanowires, extensions of the outer membrane.

=== Applications ===
The discovery of some of the respiratory capabilities possessed by members of this genus has opened the door to possible applications for these bacteria. The metal-reducing capabilities can potentially be applied to bioremediation of uranium-contaminated groundwater, with the reduced form of uranium produced being easier to remove from water than the more soluble uranium oxide. Scientists researching the creation of microbial fuel cells, designs that use bacteria to induce a current, have also made use of the metal reducing capabilities some species of Shewanella possess as a part of their metabolic repertoire.

== Significance ==
One of the roles that the genus Shewanella has in the environment is bioremediation. Shewanella species have great metabolic versatility; they can reduce various electron acceptors. Some of the electron acceptors they use are toxic substances and heavy metals, which often become less toxic after being reduced. Examples of metals that Shewanella are capable of reducing and degrading include uranium, chromium, and iron. Its ability to decrease toxicity of various substances makes Shewanella a useful tool for bioremediation. Specifically, Shewanella oneidensis strain MR-1 is often used to clean up contaminated nuclear weapon manufacturing sites.

Shewanella also contributes to the biogeochemical circulation of minerals. Members of this genus are widely distributed in aquatic habitats, from the deep sea to the shallow Antarctic Ocean. Its diverse habitats, coupled to its ability to reduce a variety of metals, makes the genus critical for the cycling of minerals. For instance, under aerobic conditions, various species of Shewanella are capable of oxidizing manganese. When conditions are changed, the same species can reduce the manganese oxide products. Hence, since Shewanella can both oxidize and reduce manganese, it is critical to the cycling of manganese.

== See also ==
- Shewanella haliotis
- Electric bacteria
- List of bacterial genera named after personal names
