= Moritella =

Scientific classification
- Domain: Bacteria
- Kingdom: Pseudomonadati
- Phylum: Pseudomonadota
- Class: Gammaproteobacteria
- Order: Alteromonadales
- Family: Moritellaceae
- Genus: Moritella; Urakawa et al. 1999

Species
- M. abyssi M. dasanensis M. japonica M. marina M. profunda M. viscosa M. yayanosii

Genus of marine bacteria

Moritella is a genus of gram-negative, rod-shaped, motile, marine bacteria in the family Moritellaceae. Members of the genus are psychrophilic or psychotolerant and are adapted to growth in cold marine environments, including deep-sea habitats and polar waters. Several species are piezophilic, growing optimally under elevated hydrostatic pressure, while others are associated with marine animals, including fish.

== Taxonomy ==
The genus was established in 1998 following phylogenetic analysis of 16S rRNA gene sequences, which showed that the previously described Vibrio marinus formed a distinct lineage separate from Vibrio. The genus is named in honor of Japanese microbiologist Ryōsuke Morita for his contributions to marine microbiology.
