= Tambjamine =

Tambjamine aldehyde
- Biosynthetic precursor to the tambjamines

Names
- IUPAC name 4-Methoxy-2,2'-bipyrrole-5-carboxaldehyde
- Other names MBC

Identifiers
CAS Number	10476-41-2
3D model (JSmol)	Interactive image
ChemSpider	133540
PubChem CID	151518
UNII	HER47SH8Q4
- InChI: InChI=1S/C10H10N2O2/c1-14-10-5-8(12-9(10)6-13)7-3-2-4-11-7/h2-6,11-12H,1H3 Key: MQCYELLGZFKAFD-UHFFFAOYSA-N
- SMILES: COC1=C(NC(=C1)C2=CC=CN2)C=O

Properties
Chemical formula	C_{10}H_{10}N_{2}O_{2}
Molar mass	190.202 g·mol^{−1}
- Except where otherwise noted, data are given for materials in their standard state (at 25 °C [77 °F], 100 kPa). Infobox references

Tambjamines are a group of natural products that are structurally related to the prodiginines. They are enamine derivatives of 4-methoxy-2,2'-bipyrrole-5-carboxaldehyde (MBC).

== Chemical structure ==
Tambjamines are composed of two pyrrole rings with an enamine moiety at C-5 and a methoxy group at C-4: the majority have short alkyl chains connected to the enamine nitrogen. This group of alkaloids have been isolated from marine invertebrates and bacteria (both marine and terrestrial).

Structures of some tambjamines

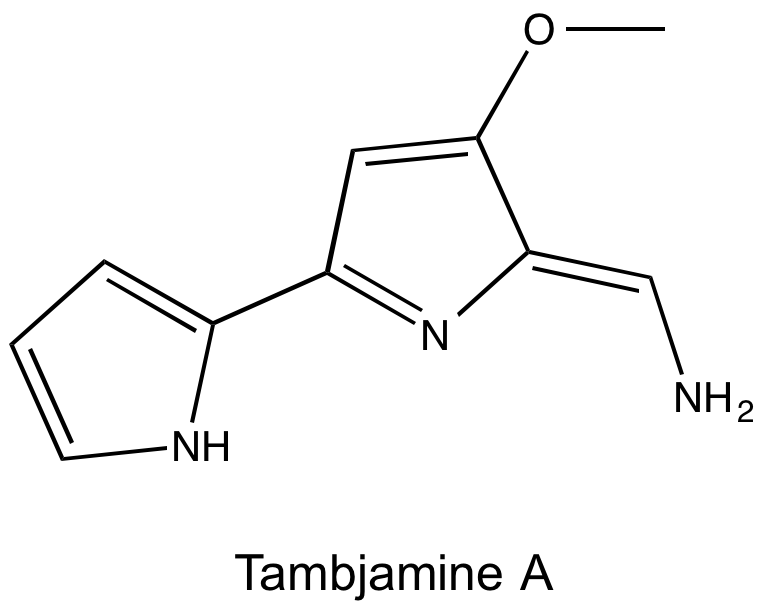
Tambjamine A

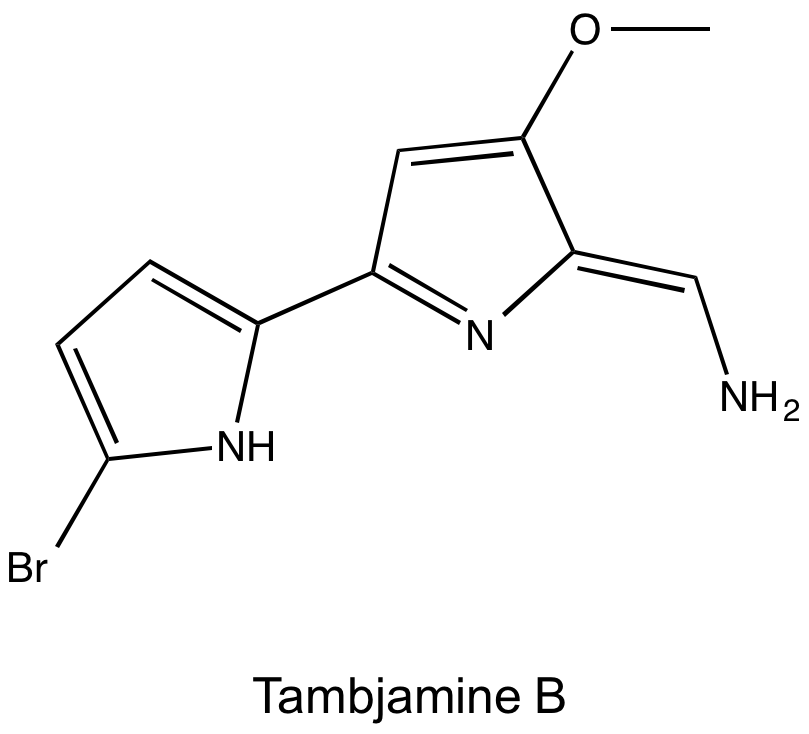
Tambjamine B

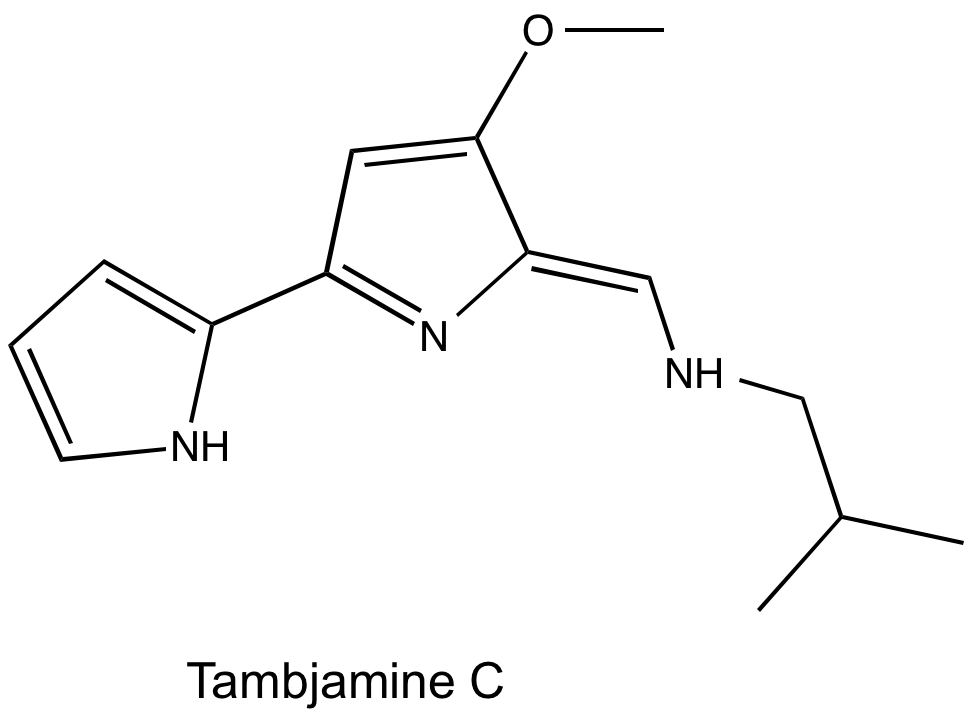
Tambjamine C

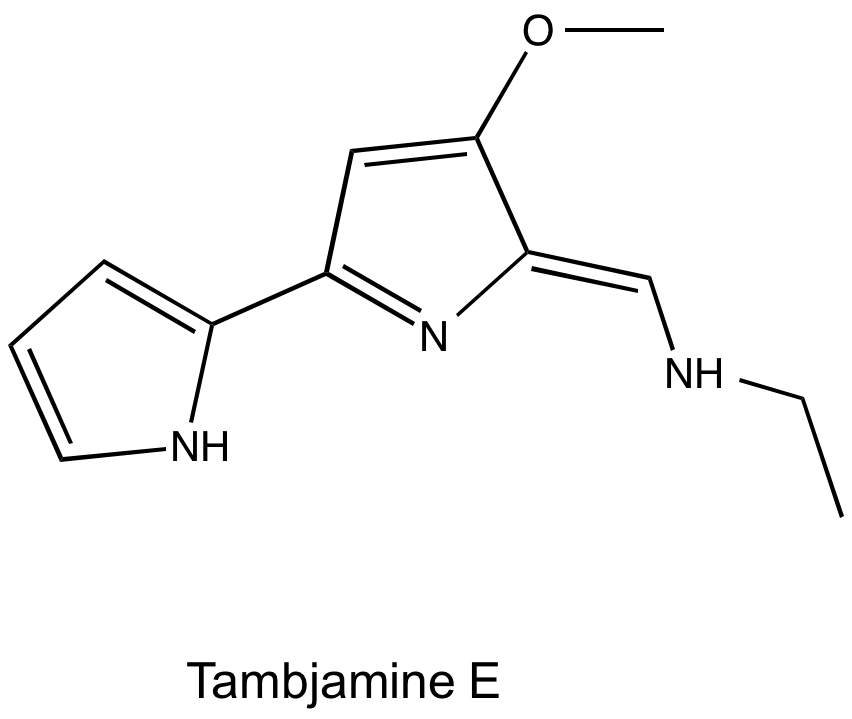
Tambjamine E

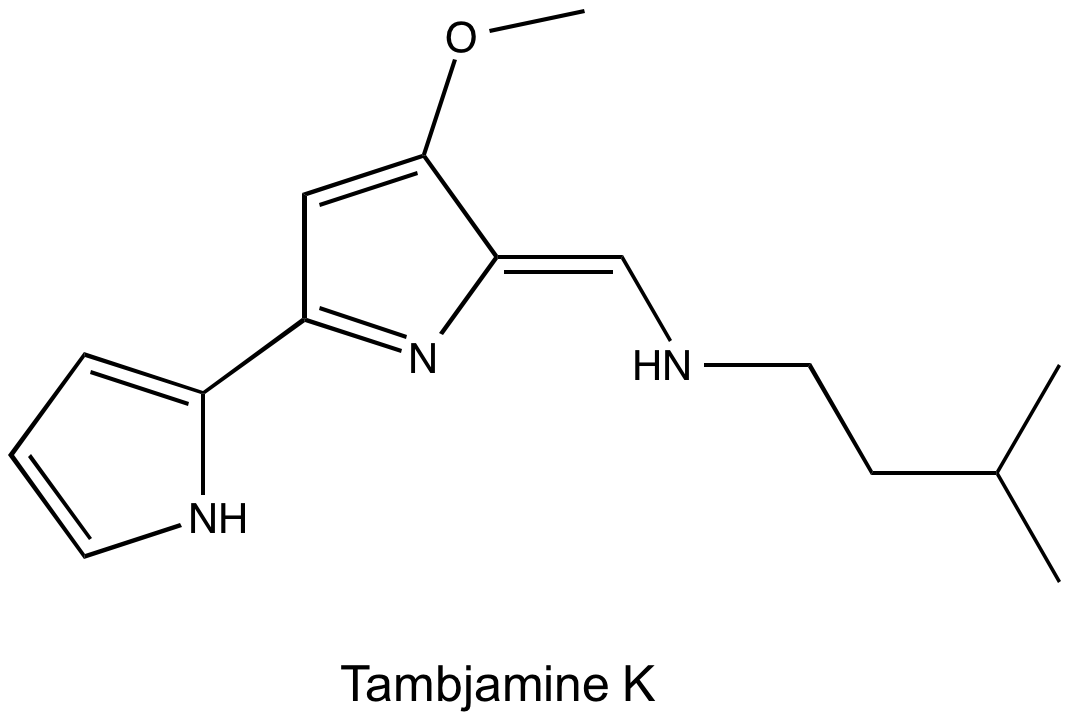
Tambjamine K

== Marine sources and ecological roles ==
The large nudibranch Roboastra tigris is a known predator of Tambja eliora and Tambja abdere, two species of smaller nudibranchs. The chemical extracts of all three nudibranch species contain tambjamines, which were traced to Sessibugula translucens, a food source of the two prey species. It is hypothesized that tambjamines are a chemical defence mechanism of the bryozoan against feeding by the spotted kelpfish Gibbonsia elegans.

== Production ==
=== Biosynthesis ===
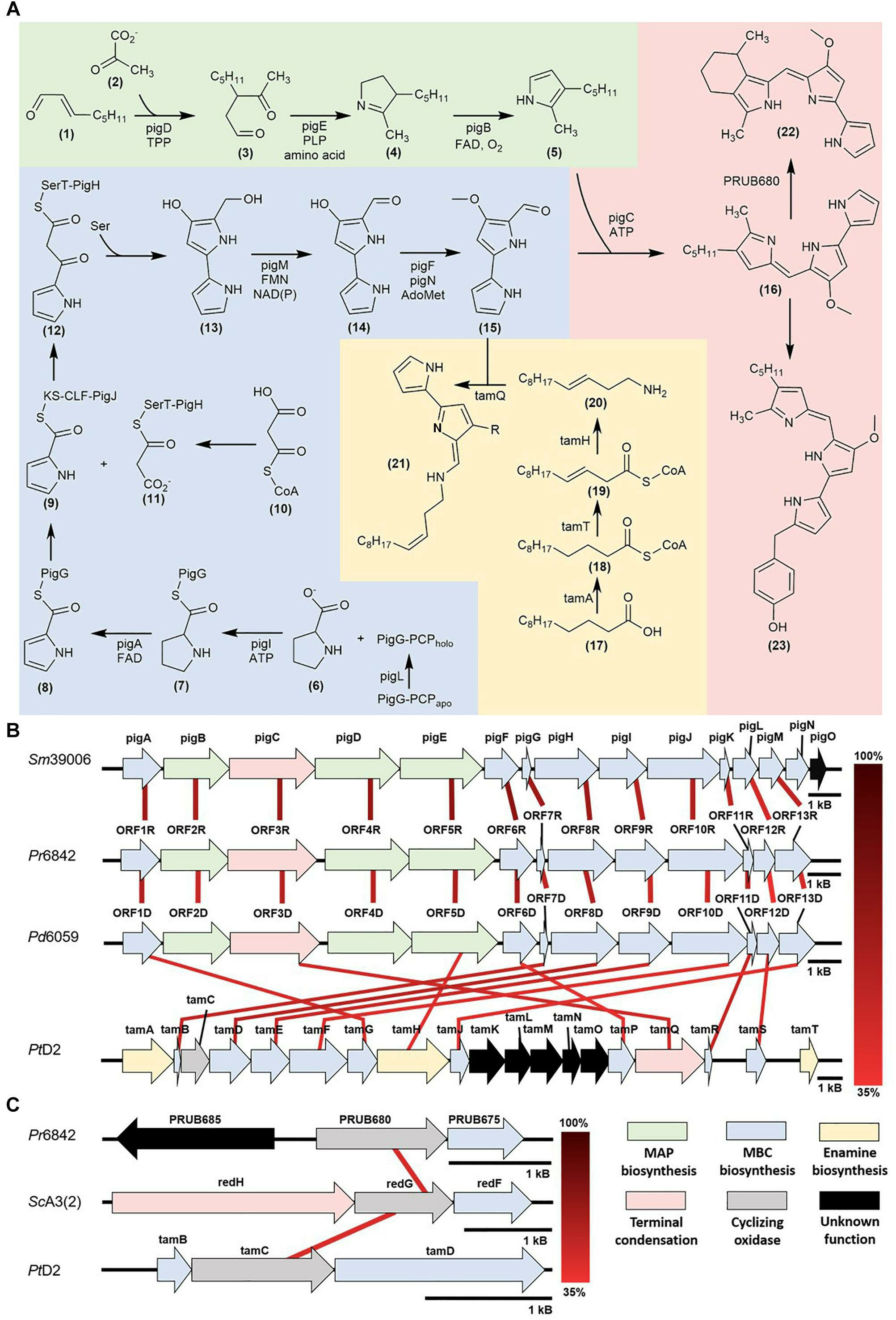
Figure 1: Chemical transformations and gene clusters for tambjamine biosynthetic pathways

The biosynthetic gene cluster responsible for tambjamine production was identified in 2007 using functional genomic analysis of a Pseudoalteromonas tunicata strain. The Tam cluster consists of 19 proteins, 12 of which were found to be highly similar to proteins in the Red and Pig pathways from prodigiosin biosynthesis, based on sequence data. The biosynthesis of tambjamine YP1 first involves the incorporation of proline, malonyl Co-A, and serine to form 4-methoxy-2,2'-bipyrrole-5-carboxaldehyde (MBC).

AfaA is hypothesized to activate long-chain fatty acids while the predicted dehydrogenase, TamT, introduces a double bond into a fatty acyl side chain. TamH then carries out the reduction of the CoA-ester to form an aldehyde intermediate, followed by transamination. Condensation of the dodec-3-en-1-amine product of this reaction and MBC by TamQ, results in the tambjamine YP1 (compound 21 in Figure 1).

=== Laboratory ===
The aldehyde MBC was first prepared by total synthesis when the structure of prodigiosin was being investigated. It has subsequently been synthesised by other methods and used to make tambjamines and related natural products.

== See also ==
- Prodiginines
