= Motilimonas =

Scientific classification
- Domain: Bacteria
- Kingdom: Pseudomonadati
- Phylum: Pseudomonadota
- Class: Gammaproteobacteria
- Order: Alteromonadales
- Family: incertae sedis
- Genus: Motilimonas; Ling et al. 2017

Type species
- Motilimonas eburnea

Species
- Motilimonas cestriensis Kelbrick et al. 2021; Motilimonas eburnea Ling et al. 2017; Motilimonas pumila Wang et al. 2019

Genus of bacteria

Motilimonas is a Gram-negative, non-spore-forming and facultatively anaerobic genus of bacteria from the order Alteromonadales. Motilimonas eburnea has been isolated from marine sediments from Weihai in China.
