= Undecylprodigiosin =

Names
- IUPAC name (2Z,5Z)-3-Methoxy-5-pyrrol-2-ylidene-2-[(5-undecyl-1H-pyrrol-2-yl)methylidene]pyrrole

Identifiers
CAS Number	52340-48-4
3D model (JSmol)	Interactive image
ChEBI	CHEBI:29702
ChEMBL	ChEMBL83139
ChemSpider	10481061
PubChem CID	135515151
UNII	ZQ2HK5E6ZG
- InChI: InChI=1S/C25H35N3O/c1-3-4-5-6-7-8-9-10-11-13-20-15-16-21(27-20)18-24-25(29-2)19-23(28-24)22-14-12-17-26-22/h12,14-19,26-27H,3-11,13H2,1-2H3/b24-18- Key: HIYSWASSDOXZLC-MOHJPFBDSA-N
- SMILES: CCCCCCCCCCCC1=CC=C(N1)/C=C\2/C(=CC(=N2)C3=CC=CN3)OC

Properties
Chemical formula	C_{25}H_{35}N_{3}O
Molar mass	393.575 g·mol^{−1}
- Except where otherwise noted, data are given for materials in their standard state (at 25 °C [77 °F], 100 kPa). Infobox references

Undecylprodigiosin is an alkaloid produced by some Actinomycetes bacteria. It is a member of the prodiginines group of natural products and has been investigated for potential antimalarial activity.

== Natural sources ==
Undecylprodigiosin is a secondary metabolite found in some Actinomycetes, for example Actinomadura madurae, Streptomyces coelicolor and Streptomyces longisporus.

== Production ==
=== Biosynthesis ===
The biosynthesis of undecylprodigiosin starts with PCP apoprotein which is transformed into the holoprotein using acetyl CoA and PPtase then adenylation occurs utilizing L-proline and ATP. The resulting molecule is then oxidized by dehydrogenase enzyme. Elongation by decarboxylative condensation with malonyl CoA is followed by another decarboxylative condensation with L-serine using α-oxamine synthase (OAS) domain. The compound is then cyclized, oxidized with dehydrogenase and methylated with SAM to give 4-methoxy-2,2′-bipyrrole-5-carboxaldehyde (MBC) intermediate which react with 2-undecylpyrrole (2-UP) to give undecylprodigiosin.

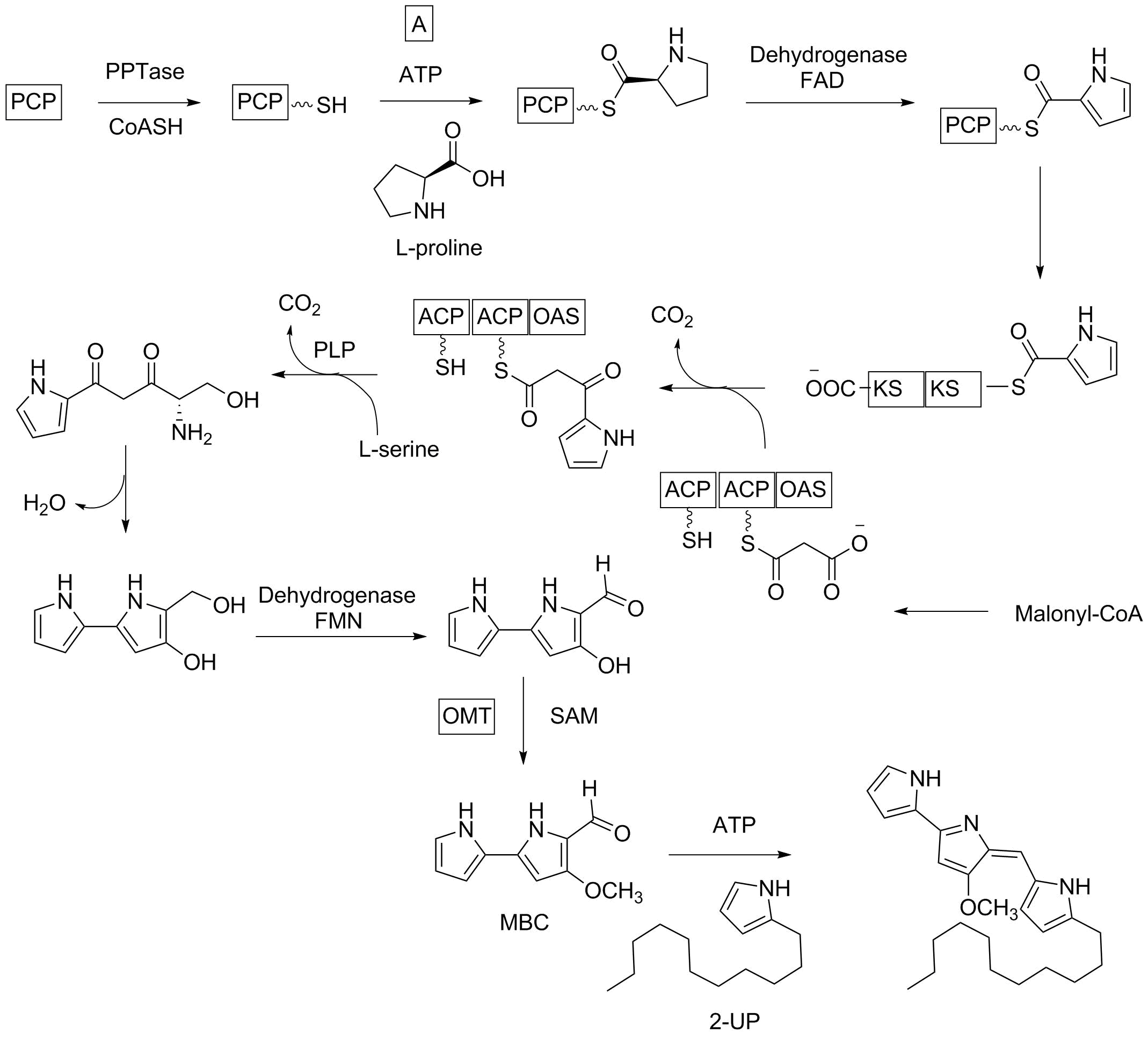
Biosynthesis of undecylprodigiosin

=== Laboratory ===
The first total synthesis of the undecylprodigiosin was published in 1966, confirming the chemical structure. As with the biosynthesis, the key intermediate was MBC.

== Uses ==
As with other prodiginines, the compound has been investigated for its pharmaceutical potential as anticancer, immunosuppressant, or antimalarial agent.
