= Aestuariicella =

Scientific classification
- Domain: Bacteria
- Phylum: Pseudomonadota
- Class: Gammaproteobacteria
- Order: Alteromonadales
- Family: incertae sedis
- Genus: Aestuariicella Lo et al. 2015

Type species
- Aestuariicella hydrocarbonica Lo et al. 2015

Species
- A. hydrocarbonica

Genus of bacteria

Aestuariicella is a rod-shaped, Gram-negative, and strictly aerobic genus of bacteria from the order Alteromonadales with one known species (Aestuariicella hydrocarbonica). Aestuariicella hydrocarbonica was first isolated in 2015 from oil spill contaminated tidal flat sediments from the Dangjin bay in Korea. Due to the recent nature of its discovery, its taxonomic classification has not yet been accepted. Future research into its evolutionary history and genome may change the naming of this organism.

While rare in seawater, A. hydrocarbonica has shown a strong association with plastic debris of various polymer types. It is commonly found along with other gammaproteobacteria capable of degrading hydrocarbons and other high-molecular-mass polymers. Bio-degradation tests have shown that it is capable of breaking down a variety of hydrocarbon polymers. However, it does not degrade the plant polymers casein and starch . These organisms are tetracycline sensitive, but are vulnerable to all other common antibiotics.

The distribution of A. hydrocarbonica is not yet described, but studies have found its presence in samples from South Korea and the Mediterranean Sea. This suggests that it may have a broad geographic distribution or be associated with area with high human impact.
