= Hentriacontanonaene =

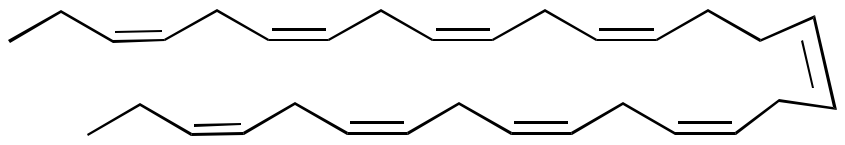

Names
- IUPAC name (3Z,6Z,9Z,12Z,15Z,19Z,22Z,25Z,28Z)-Hentriaconta-3,6,9,12,15,19,22,25,28-nonaene

Identifiers
3D model (JSmol)	Interactive image
ChEBI	CHEBI:209018
ChemSpider	67168488
PubChem CID	52922084
CompTox Dashboard (EPA)	DTXSID401032410
- InChI: InChI=1S/C31H46/c1-3-5-7-9-11-13-15-17-19-21-23-25-27-29-31-30-28-26-24-22-20-18-16-14-12-10-8-6-4-2/h5-8,11-14,17-20,23-26,29,31H,3-4,9-10,15-16,21-22,27-28,30H2,1-2H3/b7-5-,8-6-,13-11-,14-12-,19-17-,20-18-,25-23-,26-24-,31-29- Key: QBQCAYTWEQRERN-VHUCEKMMSA-N
- SMILES: CC\C=C/C\C=C/C\C=C/C\C=C/CC\C=C/C\C=C/C\C=C/C\C=C/C\C=C/CC

Properties
Chemical formula	C_{31}H_{46}
Molar mass	418.709 g·mol^{−1}
- Except where otherwise noted, data are given for materials in their standard state (at 25 °C [77 °F], 100 kPa). Infobox references

Hentriacontanonaene is a long-chain polyunsaturated hydrocarbon produced by numerous gamma-proteobacteria primarily from the marine environment. Hentriacontanonaene was originally isolated from bacterial isolates from Antarctic sea ice cores. All isolated bacteria that produced hentriacontanonaene also produced the polyunsaturated fatty acids eicosapentaenoic acid (EPA) and docosahexaenoic acid (DHA). Given its polyunsaturated nature it has been proposed that this molecule is produced as part of a response to maintain optimal membrane fluidity.

== Biosynthesis ==
The biosynthesis of this compound was initially identified by its similarity to other known pathways found in bacteria that produce similar long-chain hydrocarbons. Production of monounsaturated and tri-unsaturated long-chain hydrocarbons in various microbial lineages has been attributed to the oleABCD gene cluster. In this pathway two acyl-CoA or acyl-ACP are condensed using a non-decarboxylative Claisen condensation to yield a β-keto-thioester. Hydrolysis from the enzyme is followed by reduction of the β-keto group to an alcohol catalyzed by an NADPH dependent reductase OleD. The remaining steps include decarboxylation and dehydration, which might be combined as a single decarboxylation elimination step. The exact roles of OleB and OleC in this pathway are unknown, however deletion of oleC yielded a strain that produced a mono-ketone product without the completed olefin.

The overall unsaturation of the compound is determined by the acyl precursors and it has been hypothesized that condensation of two 16:4(n-3) acyl chains by OleABCD yields hentriacontanonaene. A polyketide-like pathway responsible for the production of eicosapentaenoic acid provides the polyunsaturated precursor for hentriacontanonaene.

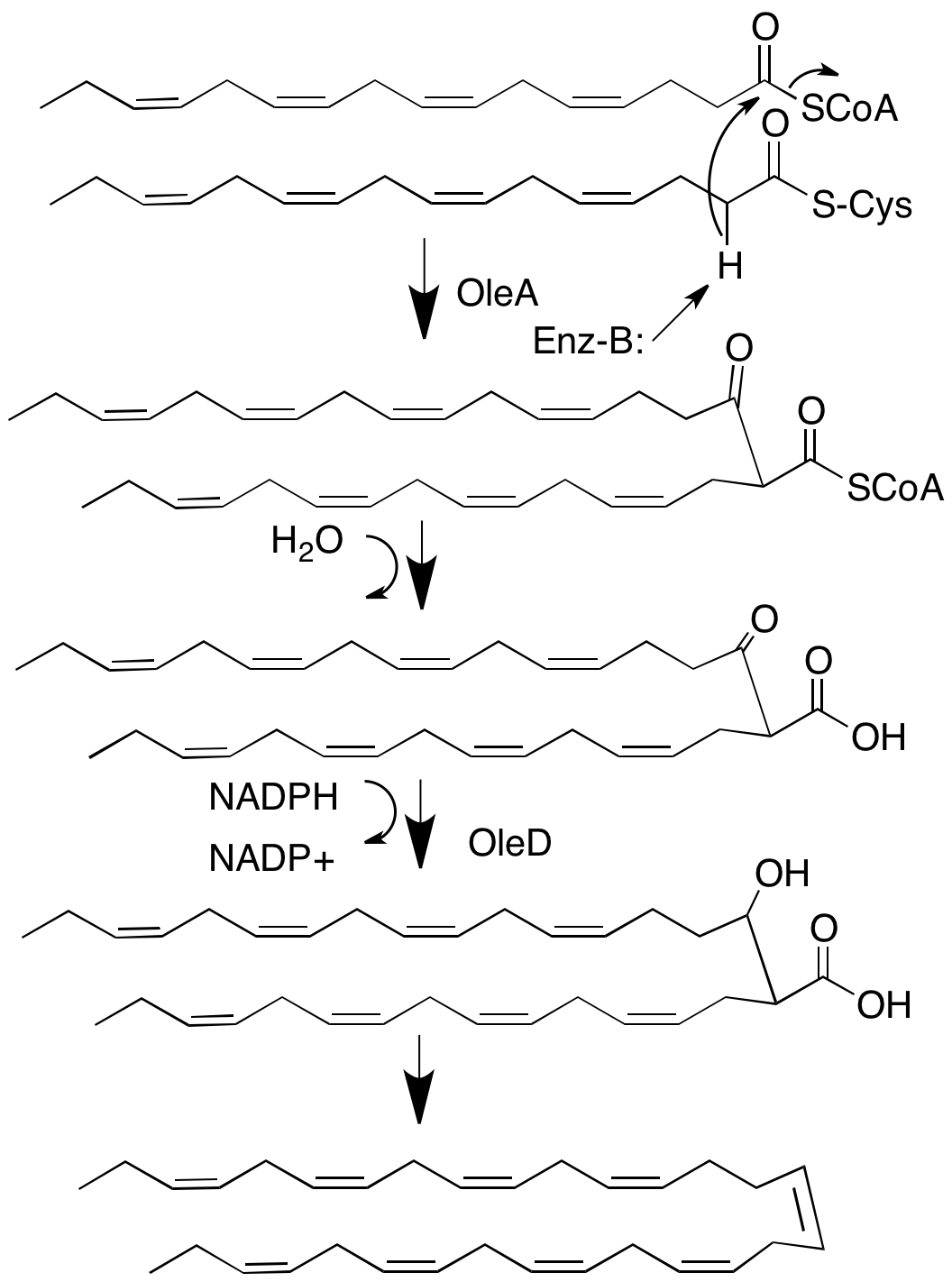
Hentriacontanonaene biosynthetic pathway
