= Prodigiosin =

Names
- IUPAC name 4-Methoxy-5-[(Z)-(5-methyl-4-pentyl-2H-pyrrol-2-ylidene)methyl]-1H,1′H-2,2′-bipyrrole

Identifiers
CAS Number	82-89-3
3D model (JSmol)	Interactive image
ChEBI	CHEBI:82758
ChEMBL	ChEMBL275787
ChemSpider	10577755
MeSH	Prodigiosin
PubChem CID	5351169
UNII	OL369FU7CJ
- InChI: InChI=1S/C20H25N3O/c1-4-5-6-8-15-11-16(22-14(15)2)12-19-20(24-3)13-18(23-19)17-9-7-10-21-17/h7,9-13,21,23H,4-6,8H2,1-3H3/b16-12+ Key: SZXDNGVQRDTJSD-FOWTUZBSSA-N; InChI=1/C20H25N3O/c1-4-5-6-8-15-11-16(22-14(15)2)12-19-20(24-3)13-18(23-19)17-9-7-10-21-17/h7,9-13,21,23H,4-6,8H2,1-3H3/b16-12+ Key: SZXDNGVQRDTJSD-FOWTUZBSBS
- SMILES: CCCCCc3cc(=Cc2[nH]c(c1ccc[nH]1)cc2OC)nc3C

Properties
Chemical formula	C_{20}H_{25}N_{3}O
Molar mass	323.440 g·mol^{−1}
- Except where otherwise noted, data are given for materials in their standard state (at 25 °C [77 °F], 100 kPa). Infobox references

Prodigiosin is a red dye produced by many strains of the bacterium Serratia marcescens, as well as other Gram-negative, gamma proteobacteria such as Vibrio psychroerythrus and Hahella chejuensis. It is responsible for the pink tint occasionally found in grime that accumulates on porcelain surfaces such as bathtubs, sinks, tiles and toilet bowls. It is in the prodiginine family of compounds which are produced in some Gram-negative gamma proteobacteria, as well as select Gram-positive Actinobacteria (e.g. Streptomyces coelicolor). The name prodigiosin is derived from prodigious (i.e. something marvelous).

== Secondary metabolite ==
Prodigiosin is a secondary metabolite of Serratia marcescens. Because it is easy to detect, it has been used as a model system to study secondary metabolism. Prodigiosin production has long been known to be enhanced by phosphate limitation. In low phosphate conditions, pigmented strains have been shown to grow to a higher density than unpigmented strains.

== Religious function ==
The ability of pigmented strains of Serratia marcescens to grow on bread has led to a possible explanation of Medieval transubstantiation miracles, in which Eucharistic bread is converted into the Body of Christ. Such miracles led to Pope Urban IV instituting the Feast of Corpus Christi in 1264. This followed celebration of a Mass at Bolsena in 1263, led by a Bohemian priest who had doubts concerning transubstantiation. During the Mass, the eucharist appeared to bleed and each time the priest wiped away the blood, more would appear. This event is celebrated in a fresco in the Pontifical Palace in the Vatican City, painted by Raphael: The Mass at Bolsena.

== Biological activity ==
Prodigiosin received renewed attention for its wide range of biological activities, including activities as antimalarial, antifungal, immunosuppressant, and antibiotic agents. It is perhaps best known for its capacity to trigger apoptosis of malignant cancer cells. The exact mechanism of this inhibition is highly complex and not entirely elucidated, but could involve multiple processes, including phosphatase inhibition, copper mediated cleavage of double stranded DNA, or disrupting the pH gradient through transmembrane transport of H+ and Cl- ions. As a result, prodigiosin is a highly promising drug lead, and is currently in preclinical phase study for pancreatic cancer treatment. Prodigiosin has recently been found to have excellent activity against stationary phase Borrelia burgdorferi, the causative agent of Lyme disease. Prodigiosin has been also reported to exhibit antimicrobial activity against Gram-positive bacteria including methicillin resistant Staphylococcus aureus (MRSA), Staphylococcus aureus, Enterococcus faecalis, as well as Gram-negative Escherichia coli, Vibrio vulnificus, Salmonella enterica. Although the exact mechanism of action is not completely understood, recent molecular docking studies show that prodigiosin may interact with fatty acid biosynthetic enzyme in bacteria. Prodigiosin is also found to act as algaecide against harmful algal bloom.

== Production ==
=== Biosynthesis ===
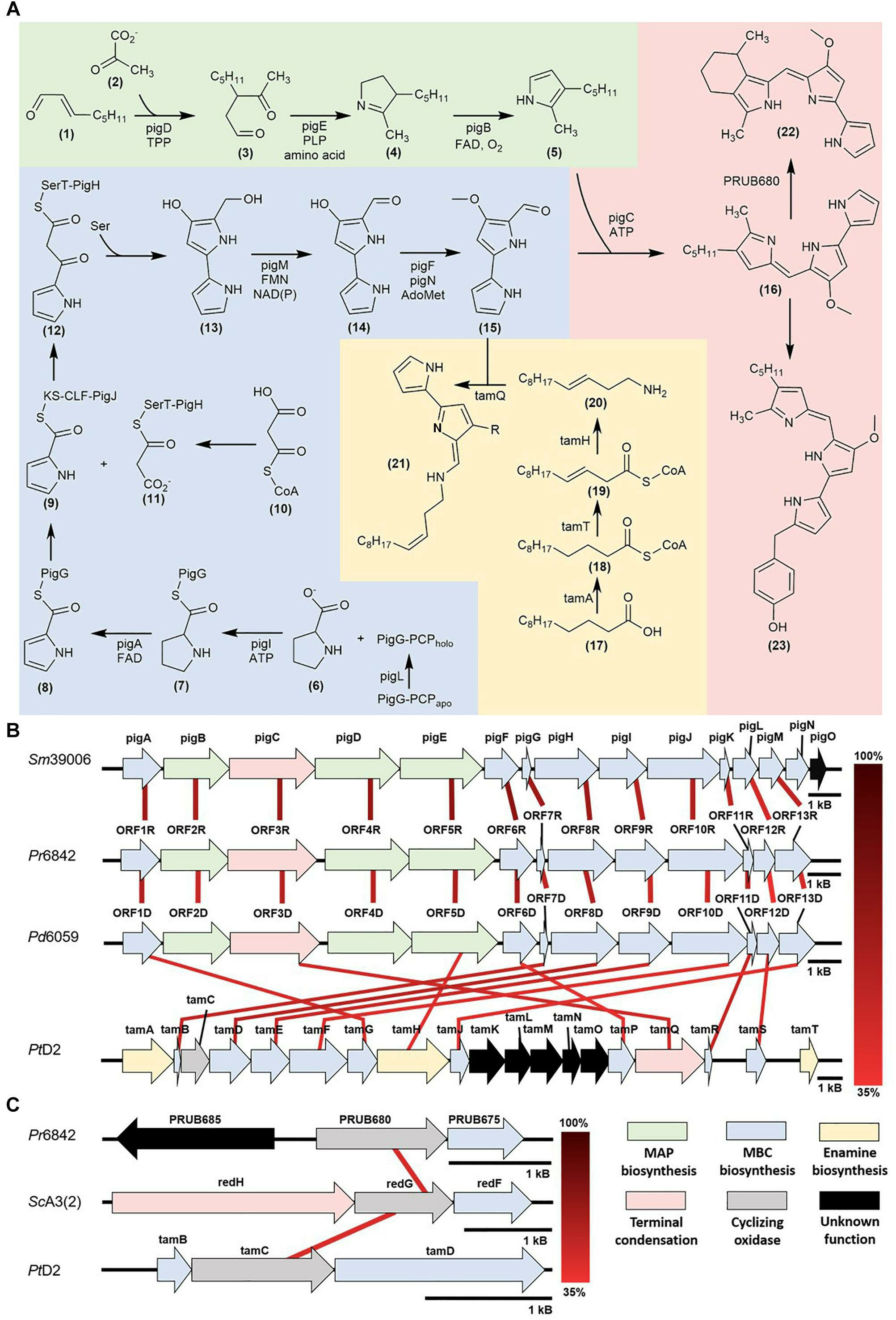
Chemical transformations and gene clusters for prodiginine biosynthetic pathways

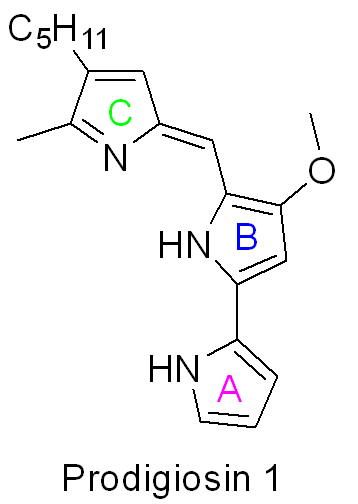
Figure 1: Structure of Prodigiosin 1 highlighting the A, B, and C pyrrole rings

The biosynthesis of prodigiosin and related analogs, the prodiginines involves the convergent coupling of three pyrrole type rings (labeled A, B, and C in figure 1) from L-proline, L-serine, L-methionine, pyruvate, and 2-octenal.

Ring A is synthesized from L-proline through the nonribosomal peptide synthase (NRPS) pathway (figure 2), wherein the pyrrolidine ring is oxidized, with flavin adenine dinucleotide (FAD^{+}) as the coenzyme to yield pyrrole ring A. In the first step, proline is attached to a peptidyl carrier protein (PCP) called pigG by the action of the enzyme pigI and then the enzyme pigA performs the oxidation.

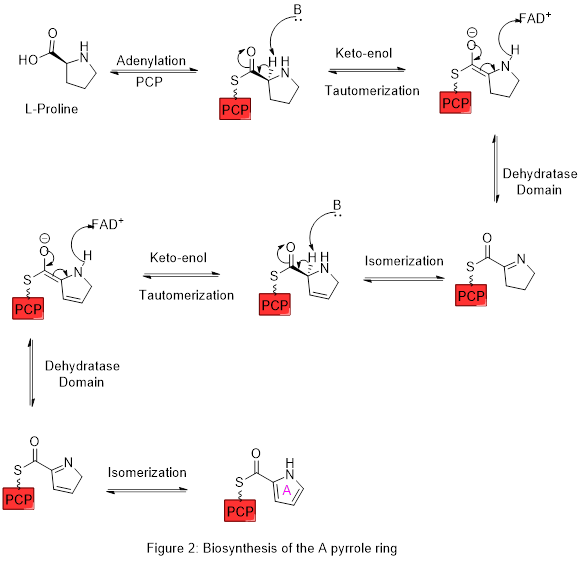

Ring A is then expanded via the polyketide synthase pathway to incorporate L-serine into ring B (figure 3). Ring A fragment is transferred from the peptidyl carrier protein (PCP) to the acyl carrier protein (ACP) by a keto-synthase (KS) domain, followed by transfer to malonyl-ACP via decarboxylative Claisen condensation catalysed by the enzyme pigJ. This fragment is then able to react with the masked carbanion formed from the pyridoxal phosphate (PLP) mediated decarboxylation of L-serine, which cyclizes in a dehydration reaction to yield the second pyrrole ring. This intermediate is then modified by oxidation of the primary alcohol to the aldehyde, catalysed by pigM, and methylation (which incorporates a methyl group from L-methionine onto the alcohol at the 6-position) catalysed by pigF and pigN. This yields the core A-B ring structure ready for further transformations, including to the tambjamines as well as the prodiginines.

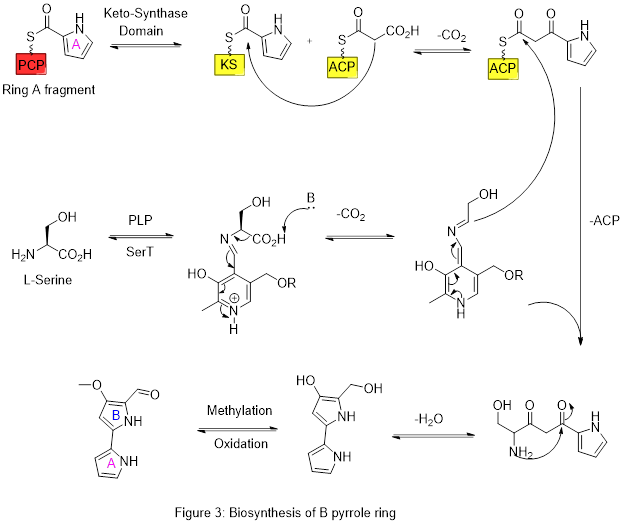

Ring C is formed from the thiamine pyrophosphate (TPP) mediated decarboxylative addition of pyruvate to 2-octenal, catalysed by pigD. PigE then converts the intermediate to an amine (using an amino-acid and PLP) ready for intramolecular condensation. PigB oxidises the resulting ring using oxygen and FAD^{+}, yielding the pyrrole.

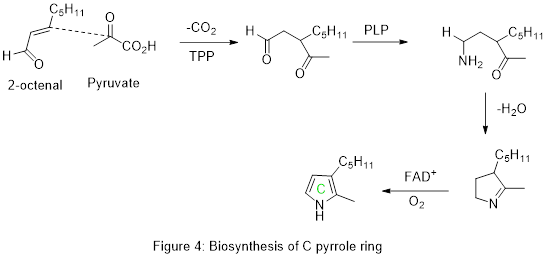

Finally, the two pieces are combined by pigC and its cofactor adenosine triphosphate (ATP) in a dehydration reaction which establishes a conjugated system across all three rings and completes the synthesis of prodigiosin.

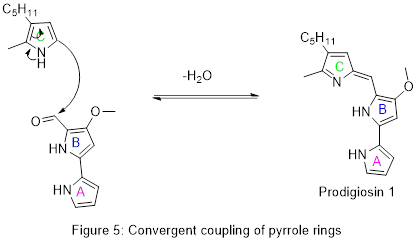

=== Laboratory ===
Details of the first total synthesis of prodigiosin were published in 1962, confirming the chemical structure. As with the biosynthesis, the key intermediate was the A-B aldehyde shown in Figure 5. This aldehyde has subsequently been prepared by other methods and used to make prodigiosin and related natural products.

== Uses ==
Along with pharmaceutical applications, it can find utility as food additives, antioxidant, colorant and many other sectors of food industries. Potential pharmaceutical uses of prodigiosin, or its use as a dyestuff, have led to studies of its production from Serratia marcescens, possibly after genetic modification.

== See also ==
- Obatoclax, an experimental drug with related chemical structure
