= Streptomyces longisporus =

Scientific classification
- Domain: Bacteria
- Kingdom: Bacillati
- Phylum: Actinomycetota
- Class: Actinomycetia
- Order: Streptomycetales
- Family: Streptomycetaceae
- Genus: Streptomyces
- Species: S. longisporus

Binomial name
- Streptomyces longisporus (Krassilnikov 1941) Waksman 1953 (Approved Lists 1980)

Type strain
- ATCC 23931, BCRC 13776, CBS 916.68, CCRC 13776, CCT 5006, CGMCC 4.1738, DSM 40166, IFO 12885, IMET 43090, INA 4417 \\/56, INA 4417/56, ISP 5166, JCM 4395, KCC S-0395, NBRC 12885, NRRL B-5336, NRRL-ISP 5166, PCM 2394, RIA 1134, VKM Ac-1896

Synonyms
- "Actinomyces longisporus" Krassilnikov 1941

Species of bacterium

Streptomyces longisporus is a bacterium species from the genus of Streptomyces which has been isolated from soil.

== See also ==
- List of Streptomyces species
