= Pseudoalteromonas translucida =

Species of bacterium

Pseudoalteromonas translucida is a marine bacterium isolated from the Gulf of Peter the Great in the sea of Japan

== Description ==
Pseudoalteromonas translucida is a Gram-negative, rod-shaped bacterium that measures roughly 0.7–0.9 µm in diameter. It consists of single cells that move using polar flagella.

The colony appearance is distinctly pale-orange-pigmented and translucent, which gives the species its name. It is a strictly aerobic chemoorganotroph with a respiratory metabolism. It does not form endospores, lacks an arginine dihydrolase system, and does not accumulate poly-β-hydroxybutyrate as an internal cellular reserve. The bacterium is oxidase- and catalase-positive.

== Physiology and cultivation ==
P. translucida requires sodium ions (Na+) or sea water to support growth, developing optimally in environments with a 1–6% NaCl concentration. The culture grows within a temperature range of 4 °C to 30 °C, with an optimal growth temperature of 25 °C; it fails to grow at 35 °C.

Physiologically, it is capable of decomposing elastin and degrading gelatin, DNA, and Tween 80. Biochemically, its genomic DNA G+C content is measured at 46.3 mol%. A specific strain (strain TAC 125) produces a fatty acid cis/trans isomerase that alters cell membrane fluidity to survive high-stress, toxic cellular environments.

== Genome ==
The complete genome sequence of the type strain (KMM 520ᵀ) reveals a multipartite architecture spanning 4,147,593 base pairs. Uniquely, its genome is split across two distinct circular chromosomes. Chromosome II contains a plasmid-type replication initiator protein (RepA), suggesting it originally evolved from a historical plasmid integration event.

== Isolation ==
The type strain, KMM 520ᵀ (also cataloged as LMG 19696ᵀ or ATCC BAA-3157ᵀ), was originally isolated from marine environmental samples collected from the Gulf of Peter the Great within the Sea of Japan. Samples were gathered from both seawater and marine sponge tissue hosts.
