= Moritellaceae =

Scientific classification
- Domain: Bacteria
- Kingdom: Pseudomonadati
- Phylum: Pseudomonadota
- Class: Gammaproteobacteria
- Order: Alteromonadales
- Family: Moritellaceae; Ivanova et al. 2004

Genera
- Moritella; Paramoritella

Family of bacteria

Moritellaceae is a family of gram-negative bacteria that belong to the order Alteromonadales. The taxon was formally described in 2004. The family contains two genera, Moritella and Paramoritella. Bacteria from the family Moritellaceae are halophilic facultative anaerobes isolated from marine environments.
