= Pseudoalteromonadaceae =

Scientific classification
- Domain: Bacteria
- Kingdom: Pseudomonadati
- Phylum: Pseudomonadota
- Class: Gammaproteobacteria
- Order: Alteromonadales
- Family: Pseudoalteromonadaceae; Ivanova et al. 2004

Genera
- Pseudoalteromonas; Algicola

Family of bacteria

The Pseudoalteromonadaceae are a small family of Pseudomonadota.
