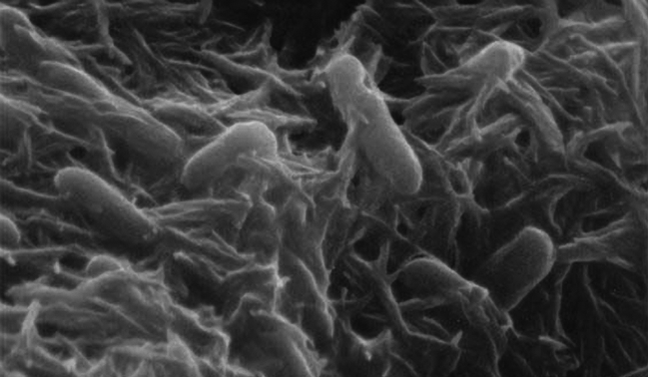
- Shewanella oneidensis

Scientific classification
- Domain: Bacteria
- Kingdom: Pseudomonadati
- Phylum: Pseudomonadota
- Class: Gammaproteobacteria
- Order: Alteromonadales; Bowman and McMeekin 2005

Families
- Alteromonadaceae; Celerinatantimonadaceae; Colwelliaceae; Ferrimonadaceae; Idiomarinaceae; Moritellaceae; Pseudoalteromonadaceae; Psychromonadaceae; Shewanellaceae; Alteromonadales incertae sedis; Aestuariicella; Motilimonas

= Alteromonadales =

Order of bacteria

The Alteromonadales are an order of Pseudomonadota. Although they have been treated as a single family, the Alteromonadaceae, they were divided into eight by Ivanova et al. in 2004. The cells are straight or curved gram-negative rods. They are motile by the use of a single flagellum. Most of the species are found in marine environments.
