= Salexigens =

Salexigens may refer to:

- Aestuariibacter salexigens, species of bacteria
- Chromohalobacter salexigens, species of bacteria
- Gramella salexigens, species of bacteria
- Rheinheimera salexigens, species of bacteria
- Salimicrobium salexigens, species of bacteria
- Virgibacillus salexigens, species of bacteria
