= Lipolytica =

Lipolytica may refer to:

- Aequorivita lipolytica, species of bacteria
- Aliiglaciecola lipolytica, species of bacteria
- Litorivivens lipolytica, species of bacteria
- Pseudoalteromonas lipolytica, species of bacteria
- Thermosyntropha lipolytica, species of bacteria
