= Paraglaciecola mesophila =

Scientific classification
- Domain: Bacteria
- Kingdom: Pseudomonadati
- Phylum: Pseudomonadota
- Class: Gammaproteobacteria
- Order: Alteromonadales
- Family: Alteromonadaceae
- Genus: Paraglaciecola
- Species: P. mesophila

Binomial name
- Paraglaciecola mesophila (Romanenko et al. 2003) Shivaji and Reddy 2014

Type strain
- CIP 108360, DSM 15026, KMM 241, LMG 22017

Synonyms
- Glaciecola mesophila

Species of bacterium

Paraglaciecola mesophila is a Gram-negative, slightly halophilic, heterotrophic and motile bacterium from the genus of Paraglaciecola which has been isolated from the liquor of an ascidian (Halocynthia aurantium) from the Troista Bay in Russia.
