= Agarivorans aestuarii =

Scientific classification
- Domain: Bacteria
- Kingdom: Pseudomonadati
- Phylum: Pseudomonadota
- Class: Gammaproteobacteria
- Order: Alteromonadales
- Family: Alteromonadaceae
- Genus: Agarivorans
- Species: A. aestuarii

Binomial name
- Agarivorans aestuarii Kim et al. 2016

Type strain
- hydD622, CGMCC 1.12692, KCTC 32543

Species of bacterium

Agarivorans aestuarii is a Gram-negative, aerobic, non-spore-forming, rod-shaped and motile bacterium from the genus of Agarivorans which has been isolated from seawater from the Asan Bay in Korea.
