= Aliiglaciecola aliphaticivorans =

Scientific classification
- Domain: Bacteria
- Kingdom: Pseudomonadati
- Phylum: Pseudomonadota
- Class: Gammaproteobacteria
- Order: Alteromonadales
- Family: Alteromonadaceae
- Genus: Aliiglaciecola
- Species: A. aliphaticivorans

Binomial name
- Aliiglaciecola aliphaticivorans Jin et al. 2015

Type strain
- GSD6, JCM 30133, KACC 18129

Species of bacterium

Aliiglaciecola aliphaticivorans is a Gram-negative, aerobic, heterotrophic and motile from the genus of Aliiglaciecola with a single polar flagellum which has been isolated from tidal flat from the Yellow Sea in Korea. Aliiglaciecola aliphaticivorans uses aliphatic hydrocarbons as a sole source of carbon.
