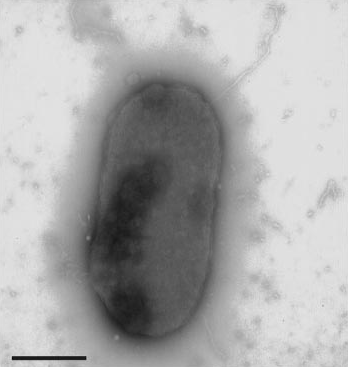
- A. fetalis grown on a BHI agar plate visualized by transmission electron microscopy

Scientific classification
- Domain: Bacteria
- Kingdom: Pseudomonadati
- Phylum: Pseudomonadota
- Class: Gammaproteobacteria
- Order: Alteromonadales
- Family: Alteromonadaceae
- Genus: Alishewanella
- Species: A. fetalis

Binomial name
- Alishewanella fetalis Fonnesbech Vogel et al. 2000

= Alishewanella fetalis =

Species of bacterium

The genus Alishewanella is one of the major branches of the family Alteromonadaceae. It was proposed to accommodate A. fetalis, isolated from an autopsy of a human fetus, in 2000. In 2009, A. aestuarii was isolated from tidal flat sediment and indicated as being a representative of Alishewanella. The third Alishewanella species was isolated from gajami sikhae, a Korean fermented food, in 2009 and was given the name A. jeotgali. Most recently, in 2010, the fourth currently isolated species of Alishewanella, A. agri, was isolated from landfill soil in Korea. Currently these are the only four isolated and characterized species of the genus Alishewanella.

== Identification ==
Alishewanella fetalis is a Gram-negative, non-motile, facultatively anaerobic, rod-shaped bacterium. These rods are about 2 μm in length and 0.5-1 μm in width. They typically occur as a single cell. It was initially mislabelled as Shewanella putrefaciens, previously known as Pseudomonas putrefaciens, due to the presence of similar fatty acids in its membrane lipids. However, after further evaluation, it was found that this was a novel species. Due to the relatedness to Shewanella, the genus was named Alishewanella. Also, having been initially isolated from an autopsy of a human fetus in 1992 in Sweden, it was given the species name fetalis.

== Growth ==
A. fetalis grows at temperatures between 25° and 42 °C, with optimum growth at 37 °C. It cannot grow below 20 °C. It is facultatively anaerobic and can utilize electron acceptors such as trimethylamine oxide (TMAO), nitrate, nitrite, and thiosulphate, but not sulphite or ferric iron. It is not only halotolerant, but requires NaCl for growth. NaCl concentrations of up to 8%, but not 10% are tolerated. A. fetalis is oxidase- and catalase-positive but does not produce indole and β-galactosidase. It cannot ferment carbohydrates. By these results, A. fetalis is very closely related to both Shewanella putrefaciens and Shewanella algae. However, A. fetalis differs from the Shewanella genus by the ability to produce H_{2}S.

== Genome ==
Studies of A. fetalis show that the GC content of the genome is 50.6%, which differs greatly from that of Shewanella putrefaciens, with a GC content of 42-47%. It shows a relationship to both Rheinheimara baltica through 16S rRNA, and to the family Vibrionaceae through gyrase B. With regards to other Alishewanella species, A. fetalis is closely related to Alishewanella jeotgali (98.04%), Alishewanella aestuarii (98.3%), and Alishewanella agri (98.7%) by 16S rRNA.
