= Microbulbifer hydrolyticus =

Scientific classification
- Domain: Bacteria
- Kingdom: Pseudomonadati
- Phylum: Pseudomonadota
- Class: Gammaproteobacteria
- Order: Alteromonadales
- Family: Alteromonadaceae
- Genus: Microbulbifer
- Species: M. hydrolyticus

Binomial name
- Microbulbifer hydrolyticus González et al. 1997

Species of bacterium

Microbulbifer hydrolyticus is a gram-negative, rod-shaped, strictly aerobic bacteria, the type species of its genus. It was first isolated from lignin-rich pulp mill effluent. Its type strain is IRE-31 (= ATCC 700072). M. hydrolyticus is strictly aerobic.
