= Paraglaciecola chathamensis =

Scientific classification
- Domain: Bacteria
- Kingdom: Pseudomonadati
- Phylum: Pseudomonadota
- Class: Gammaproteobacteria
- Order: Alteromonadales
- Family: Alteromonadaceae
- Genus: Paraglaciecola
- Species: P. chathamensis

Binomial name
- Paraglaciecola chathamensis (Matsuyama et al. 2006) Shivaji and Reddy 2014

Type strain
- JCM 13645, NCIMB 14146, S18K6

Synonyms
- Paraglaciecola agarilytica (Yong et al. 2007) Shivaji and Reddy 2014; Glaciecola agarilytica Yong et al. 2007; Paraglaciecola oceanifecundans Shivaji and Reddy 2014; Glaciecola chathamensis Matsuyama et al. 2006

Species of bacterium

Paraglaciecola chathamensis is a Gram-negative, strictly aerobic, chemoheterotrophic and motile bacterium from the genus of Paraglaciecola which has been isolated from sediments from the Pacific Ocean.
