= Salinimonas lutimaris =

Scientific classification
- Domain: Bacteria
- Kingdom: Pseudomonadati
- Phylum: Pseudomonadota
- Class: Gammaproteobacteria
- Order: Alteromonadales
- Family: Alteromonadaceae
- Genus: Salinimonas
- Species: S. lutimaris

Binomial name
- Salinimonas lutimaris Yoon et al. 2012

Type strain
- CCUG 60743, KCTC 23464, DPSR-4

Species of bacterium

Salinimonas lutimaris is a Gram-negative, non-endospore-forming and non-motile bacterium from the genus of Salinimonas which has been isolated from tidal flat sediments from the coast of Korea.
