= Alishewanella solinquinati =

Scientific classification
- Domain: Bacteria
- Kingdom: Pseudomonadati
- Phylum: Pseudomonadota
- Class: Gammaproteobacteria
- Order: Alteromonadales
- Family: Alteromonadaceae
- Genus: Alishewanella
- Species: A. solinquinati

Binomial name
- Alishewanella solinquinati Kolekar et al. 2014

Type strain
- BCRC 17848, NCIM 5295, KMK6

Synonyms
- Alishewanella contaminisoli, Alishewanella ichalkaranjicisoli

Species of bacterium

Alishewanella solinquinati is a Gram-negative, facultative anaerobic, rod-shaped and motile bacterium from the genus of Alishewanella.
