= Microbulbifer marinus =

Scientific classification
- Domain: Bacteria
- Kingdom: Pseudomonadati
- Phylum: Pseudomonadota
- Class: Gammaproteobacteria
- Order: Alteromonadales
- Family: Alteromonadaceae
- Genus: Microbulbifer
- Species: M. marinus

Binomial name
- Microbulbifer marinus Zhang et al. 2012

Species of bacterium

Microbulbifer marinus is a Gram-negative, aerobic bacterium found in marine sediment. Its type strain is Y215^{T} (=CGMCC 1.10657^{T} =JCM 17211^{T}).
