= Paraglaciecola aestuariivivens =

Scientific classification
- Domain: Bacteria
- Kingdom: Pseudomonadati
- Phylum: Pseudomonadota
- Class: Gammaproteobacteria
- Order: Alteromonadales
- Family: Alteromonadaceae
- Genus: Paraglaciecola
- Species: P. aestuariivivens

Binomial name
- Paraglaciecola aestuariivivens Park et al. 2017

Type strain
- KCTC 52838, NBRC 112782, JDTF-33

Species of bacterium

Paraglaciecola aestuariivivens is a Gram-negative and aerobic bacterium from the genus of Paraglaciecola which has been isolated from tidal flat sediments from Jindo in Korea.
