= Bowmanella denitrificans =

Scientific classification
- Domain: Bacteria
- Kingdom: Pseudomonadati
- Phylum: Pseudomonadota
- Class: Gammaproteobacteria
- Order: Alteromonadales
- Family: Alteromonadaceae
- Genus: Bowmanella
- Species: B. denitrificans

Binomial name
- Bowmanella denitrificans Jean et al. 2006

Type strain
- BCRC 17491, BD1, CCRC 17491, DSM 19705, JCM 13378

Synonyms
- Baumanella denitrificans

Species of bacterium

Bowmanella denitrificans is a Gram-negative, heterotrophic and denitrifying bacterium from the genus Bowmanella which has been isolated from shallow coastal water from the An-Ping Harbour in Tainan in Taiwan.
