= Bowmanella pacifica =

Scientific classification
- Domain: Bacteria
- Kingdom: Pseudomonadati
- Phylum: Pseudomonadota
- Class: Gammaproteobacteria
- Order: Alteromonadales
- Family: Alteromonadaceae
- Genus: Bowmanella
- Species: B. pacifica

Binomial name
- Bowmanella pacifica Lai et al. 2009

Type strain
- CGMCC 1.7086, LMG 24568, MCCC 1A01018, W3-3A

Species of bacterium

Bowmanella pacifica is a bacterium from the genus Bowmanella which has been isolated from sediments from the Pacific Ocean. Bowmanella pacifica degrades pyrene.
