= Paraglaciecola hydrolytica =

Scientific classification
- Domain: Bacteria
- Kingdom: Pseudomonadati
- Phylum: Pseudomonadota
- Class: Gammaproteobacteria
- Order: Alteromonadales
- Family: Alteromonadaceae
- Genus: Paraglaciecola
- Species: P. hydrolytica

Binomial name
- Paraglaciecola hydrolytica Bech et al. 2017

Type strain
- DSM 102834, LMG 29457, NCIMB 15060, strain S66

Species of bacterium

Paraglaciecola hydrolytica is a Gram-negative, hydrolytic, aerobic and rod-shaped bacterium from the genus of Paraglaciecola which has been isolated from eelgrass from Zealand in Denmark.
