= Agaribacter marinus =

Scientific classification
- Domain: Bacteria
- Kingdom: Pseudomonadati
- Phylum: Pseudomonadota
- Class: Gammaproteobacteria
- Order: Alteromonadales
- Family: Alteromonadaceae
- Genus: Agaribacter
- Species: A. marinus

Binomial name
- Agaribacter marinus Teramoto and Nishijima 2014

Type strain
- 8-8 , LMG 28167, NBRC 110023

Species of bacterium

Agaribacter marinus is a Gram-negative, mesophilic, aerobic, rod-shaped and motile bacterium from the genus of Agaribacter which has been isolated from surface seawater from Muroto in Japan.
