= Glaciecola nitratireducens =

Scientific classification
- Domain: Bacteria
- Kingdom: Pseudomonadati
- Phylum: Pseudomonadota
- Class: Gammaproteobacteria
- Order: Alteromonadales
- Family: Alteromonadaceae
- Genus: Glaciecola
- Species: G. nitratireducens

Binomial name
- Glaciecola nitratireducens Baik et al. 2006

Species of bacterium

Glaciecola nitratireducens is a psychrophilic bacteria. It is Gram-negative, aerobic, rod-shaped, motile and halophilic. Its type strain is FR1064(T) (=KCTC 12276(T)=JCM 12485(T)). Its genome has been sequenced.
