= Microbulbifer agarilyticus =

Scientific classification
- Domain: Bacteria
- Kingdom: Pseudomonadati
- Phylum: Pseudomonadota
- Class: Gammaproteobacteria
- Order: Alteromonadales
- Family: Alteromonadaceae
- Genus: Microbulbifer
- Species: M. agarilyticus

Binomial name
- Microbulbifer agarilyticus Miyazaki et al. 2008

Type strain
- DSM 19200, JCM 14708, JAMB-A3, JAMM 0654, JAMM 0793

Synonyms
- Microbulbifer agarolyticus

Species of bacterium

Microbulbifer agarilyticus is a bacterium from the genus of Microbulbifer which has been isolated from deep-sea sediments from the Sagami Bay in Japan.
