= Marinobacterium nitratireducens =

Scientific classification
- Domain: Bacteria
- Kingdom: Pseudomonadati
- Phylum: Pseudomonadota
- Class: Gammaproteobacteria
- Order: Alteromonadales
- Family: Alteromonadaceae
- Genus: Marinobacterium
- Species: M. nitratireducens

Binomial name
- Marinobacterium nitratireducens Huo et al. 2009

Type strain
- CGMCC 1.7286, JCM 15523, CN44

Species of bacterium

Marinobacterium nitratireducens is a Gram-negative, strictly aerobic and non-spore-forming bacterium from the genus of Marinobacterium which has been isolated from sediments from the East China Sea.
