= Microbulbifer celer =

Scientific classification
- Domain: Bacteria
- Kingdom: Pseudomonadati
- Phylum: Pseudomonadota
- Class: Gammaproteobacteria
- Order: Alteromonadales
- Family: Alteromonadaceae
- Genus: Microbulbifer
- Species: M. celer

Binomial name
- Microbulbifer celer Yoon et al. 2007

Species of bacterium

Microbulbifer celer is a Gram-negative, rod-shaped and non-motile bacterium from the genus of Microbulbifer which has been isolated from a marine solar saltern from the Yellow Sea in Korea.
