= Alishewanella tabrizica =

Scientific classification
- Domain: Bacteria
- Kingdom: Pseudomonadati
- Phylum: Pseudomonadota
- Class: Gammaproteobacteria
- Order: Alteromonadales
- Family: Alteromonadaceae
- Genus: Alishewanella
- Species: A. tabrizica

Binomial name
- Alishewanella tabrizica Tarhriz et al. 2012

Type strain
- Hejazi ST4, JCM 17275, KCTC 23723, LMG 26473, RCRI4

Species of bacterium

Alishewanella tabrizica is a Gram-negative, aerobic, rod-shaped and motile bacterium from the genus of Alishewanella which has been isolated from water from the Qurugöl Lake from Tabriz in Iran.
