= Aestuariibacter =

Scientific classification
- Domain: Bacteria
- Kingdom: Pseudomonadati
- Phylum: Pseudomonadota
- Class: Gammaproteobacteria
- Order: Alteromonadales
- Family: Alteromonadaceae
- Genus: Aestuariibacter; Ye et al. 2004

Type species
- Aestuariibacter salexigens

Species
- A. aggregatus A. halophilus A. litoralis A. salexigens

Genus of bacteria

Aestuariibacter is a genus of gram-negative bacteria in the class Gammaproteobacteria, composed of four species, namely A. aggregatus, A. halophilus, A. litoralis and the type species A. salexigens. These are strictly aerobic marine rod-shaped bacteria. They share many traits with the sister genus Alteromonas, the type genus of the family (Alteromonadaceae) and order (Alteromonadales).

== Etymology ==
The name Aestuariibacter derives from the Latin noun aestuarium, a tidal flat (the part of the sea coast which, during the flood-tide, is overflowed, but at ebb-tide is left covered with mud or slime) and the Neo-Latin masculine gender noun bacter, bacterium and thus means a tidal-flat bacterium, as three species, except A. halophilus from the Yellow sea, were isolated in tidal flats.
