= Paraglaciecola psychrophila =

Scientific classification
- Domain: Bacteria
- Kingdom: Pseudomonadati
- Phylum: Pseudomonadota
- Class: Gammaproteobacteria
- Order: Alteromonadales
- Family: Alteromonadaceae
- Genus: Paraglaciecola
- Species: P. psychrophila

Binomial name
- Paraglaciecola psychrophila (Zhang et al. 2006) Shivaji and Reddy 2014

Synonyms
- Glaciecola psychrophila

Species of bacterium

Paraglaciecola psychrophila is a Gram-negative, psychrophilic and motile bacterium from the genus of Paraglaciecola which has been isolated from the Arctic.
