= Salinimonas chungwhensis =

Scientific classification
- Domain: Bacteria
- Kingdom: Pseudomonadati
- Phylum: Pseudomonadota
- Class: Gammaproteobacteria
- Order: Alteromonadales
- Family: Alteromonadaceae
- Genus: Salinimonas
- Species: S. chungwhensis

Binomial name
- Salinimonas chungwhensis Jeon et al. 2005

Type strain
- BH030046, DSM 16280, KCTC 12239

Species of bacterium

Salinimonas chungwhensis is a Gram-negative, chemoheterotrophic, moderately halophilic and motile bacterium from the genus of Salinimonas which has been isolated from soil from a solar saltern from Chungwha in Korea.
