= Alishewanella agri =

Scientific classification
- Domain: Bacteria
- Kingdom: Pseudomonadati
- Phylum: Pseudomonadota
- Class: Gammaproteobacteria
- Order: Alteromonadales
- Family: Alteromonadaceae
- Genus: Alishewanella
- Species: A. agri

Binomial name
- Alishewanella agri Kim et al. 2010

Type strain
- JCM 15597, KCTC 22400, BL06

Species of bacterium

Alishewanella agri is a Gram-negative, aerobic, rod-shaped and non-motile bacterium from the genus of Alishewanella which has been isolated from landfill soil.
