= Marinobacterium rhizophilum =

Scientific classification
- Domain: Bacteria
- Kingdom: Pseudomonadati
- Phylum: Pseudomonadota
- Class: Gammaproteobacteria
- Order: Alteromonadales
- Family: Alteromonadaceae
- Genus: Marinobacterium
- Species: M. rhizophilum

Binomial name
- Marinobacterium rhizophilum Kim et al. 2008

Type strain
- CL-YJ9, DSM 18822, KCCM 42386

Synonyms
- Marinobacterium rhizophila

Species of bacterium

Marinobacterium rhizophilum is a Gram-negative and strictly aerobic bacterium from the genus of Marinobacterium which has been isolated from sediments near the roots of the plant Suaeda japonica from Eulwangri beach in Korea.
