= Paraglaciecola arctica =

Scientific classification
- Domain: Bacteria
- Kingdom: Pseudomonadati
- Phylum: Pseudomonadota
- Class: Gammaproteobacteria
- Order: Alteromonadales
- Family: Alteromonadaceae
- Genus: Paraglaciecola
- Species: P. arctica

Binomial name
- Paraglaciecola arctica (Zhang et al. 2011) Shivaji and Reddy 2014

Type strain
- CCTCC AB 209161, KACC 14537, BSs20135

Synonyms
- Glaciecola arctica

Species of bacterium

Paraglaciecola arctica is a Gram-negative, psychrotolerant and motile bacterium from the genus of Paraglaciecola which has been isolated from sediments from the Arctic Ocean.
