= Marinobacterium litorale =

Scientific classification
- Domain: Bacteria
- Kingdom: Pseudomonadati
- Phylum: Pseudomonadota
- Class: Gammaproteobacteria
- Order: Alteromonadales
- Family: Alteromonadaceae
- Genus: Marinobacterium
- Species: M. litorale

Binomial name
- Marinobacterium litorale Kim et al. 2007

Type strain
- CCUG 54309, IMCC 1877, KCTC 12756, LMG 23872

Synonyms
- Insulimonas litoralis

Species of bacterium

Marinobacterium litorale is a Gram-negative, chemoheterotrophic and facultatively anaerobic bacterium from the genus of Marinobacterium which has been isolated from seawater the coast of Deokjeokdo.
