= Microbulbifer echini =

Scientific classification
- Domain: Bacteria
- Kingdom: Pseudomonadati
- Phylum: Pseudomonadota
- Class: Gammaproteobacteria
- Order: Alteromonadales
- Family: Alteromonadaceae
- Genus: Microbulbifer
- Species: M. echini

Binomial name
- Microbulbifer echini Lee et al. 2017

Species of bacterium

Microbulbifer marinus is a Gram-negative and strictly aerobic bacterium from the genus of Microbulbifer which has been isolated from the gastrointestinal tract of the sea urchin Heliocidaris crassispina from Dokdo in Korea.
