= Marinobacterium jannaschii =

Scientific classification
- Domain: Bacteria
- Kingdom: Pseudomonadati
- Phylum: Pseudomonadota
- Class: Gammaproteobacteria
- Order: Alteromonadales
- Family: Alteromonadaceae
- Genus: Marinobacterium
- Species: M. jannaschii

Binomial name
- Marinobacterium jannaschii (Bowditch et al. 1984) Satomi et al. 2002

Synonyms
- Oceanospirillum jannaschii

Species of bacterium

Marinobacterium jannaschii is a Gram-negative bacterium. The cells are straight rods. It was isolated from seawater.
