= Bowmanella dokdonensis =

Scientific classification
- Domain: Bacteria
- Kingdom: Pseudomonadati
- Phylum: Pseudomonadota
- Class: Gammaproteobacteria
- Order: Alteromonadales
- Family: Alteromonadaceae
- Genus: Bowmanella
- Species: B. dokdonensis

Binomial name
- Bowmanella dokdonensis Hwang et al. 2015

Species of bacterium

Bowmanella dokdonensis is a Gram-negative, rod-shaped, exoelectrogenic and motile bacterium from the genus Bowmanella which has been isolated from seawater from the Liancourt Rocks.
