= Catenovulum agarivorans =

Scientific classification
- Domain: Bacteria
- Kingdom: Pseudomonadati
- Phylum: Pseudomonadota
- Class: Gammaproteobacteria
- Order: Alteromonadales
- Family: Alteromonadaceae
- Genus: Catenovulum
- Species: C. agarivorans

Binomial name
- Catenovulum agarivorans Yan et al. 2011

Type strain
- CGMCC 1.10245, DSM 23111, JCM 16580, YM01

Species of bacterium

Catenovulum agarivorans is a Gram-negative, aerobic bacterium from the genus Catenovulum which has been isolated from seawater from the Yellow Sea in China.
