= Alishewanella alkalitolerans =

Scientific classification
- Domain: Bacteria
- Kingdom: Pseudomonadati
- Phylum: Pseudomonadota
- Class: Gammaproteobacteria
- Order: Alteromonadales
- Family: Alteromonadaceae
- Genus: Alishewanella
- Species: A. alkalitolerans

Binomial name
- Alishewanella alkalitolerans Sisinthy et al. 2018

Type strain
- KCTC 52279, LMG 29592, LNK-7.1

Species of bacterium

Alishewanella alkalitolerans is a bacterium from the genus of Alishewanella which has been isolated from water from the Lonar lake in India.
