= Microbulbifer mangrovi =

Scientific classification
- Domain: Bacteria
- Kingdom: Pseudomonadati
- Phylum: Pseudomonadota
- Class: Gammaproteobacteria
- Order: Alteromonadales
- Family: Alteromonadaceae
- Genus: Microbulbifer
- Species: M. mangrovi

Binomial name
- Microbulbifer mangrovi Vashist et al. 2013

Species of bacterium

Microbulbifer mangrovi is a polysaccharide-degrading bacterium isolated from an Indian mangrove, hence its name. It is rod-shaped, Gram-negative, non-motile, aerobic and non-endospore forming, its type strain designated DD-13(T).
