= Marinobacterium sediminicola =

Scientific classification
- Domain: Bacteria
- Kingdom: Pseudomonadati
- Phylum: Pseudomonadota
- Class: Gammaproteobacteria
- Order: Alteromonadales
- Family: Alteromonadaceae
- Genus: Marinobacterium
- Species: M. sediminicola

Binomial name
- Marinobacterium sediminicola Huo et al. 2009

Type strain
- CGMCC 1.7287, JCM 15524, CN47

Species of bacterium

Marinobacterium sediminicola is a Gram-negative, non-spore-forming and strictly aerobic bacterium from the genus of Marinobacterium which has been isolated from sediments from the East China Sea.
