= Agarivorans litoreus =

Scientific classification
- Domain: Bacteria
- Kingdom: Pseudomonadati
- Phylum: Pseudomonadota
- Class: Gammaproteobacteria
- Order: Alteromonadales
- Family: Alteromonadaceae
- Genus: Agarivorans
- Species: A. litoreus

Binomial name
- Agarivorans litoreus Park et al. 2015

Type strain
- GJSW-6, KCTC 42116, NBRC 110444

Species of bacterium

Agarivorans litoreus is a Gram-negative, aerobic, rod-shaped, non-spore-forming and motile bacterium from the genus of Agarivorans which has been isolated from seawater from the Geoje Island in Korea.
