= Glaciecola punicea =

Scientific classification
- Domain: Bacteria
- Kingdom: Pseudomonadati
- Phylum: Pseudomonadota
- Class: Gammaproteobacteria
- Order: Alteromonadales
- Family: Alteromonadaceae
- Genus: Glaciecola
- Species: G. punicea

Binomial name
- Glaciecola punicea Bowman et al. 1998

Species of bacterium

Glaciecola punicea is a psychrophilic bacteria found in Antarctic sea-ice habitats, being the type species of its genus. It is pigmented, psychrophilic, and a strictly aerobic chemoheterotroph. Its type strain is (ACAM 611^{T}). Its genome has been sequenced.
