= Alishewanella aestuarii =

Scientific classification
- Domain: Bacteria
- Kingdom: Pseudomonadati
- Phylum: Pseudomonadota
- Class: Gammaproteobacteria
- Order: Alteromonadales
- Family: Alteromonadaceae
- Genus: Alishewanella
- Species: A. aestuarii

Binomial name
- Alishewanella aestuarii Roh et al. 2009

Type strain
- B11, DSM 19476, KCTC 22051, LMG 26132

Species of bacterium

Alishewanella aestuarii is a Gram-negative bacterium from the genus of Alishewanella which has been isolated from tidal flat sediments from Yeosu in Korea.
