= Aestuariibacter aggregatus =

Scientific classification
- Domain: Bacteria
- Kingdom: Pseudomonadati
- Phylum: Pseudomonadota
- Class: Gammaproteobacteria
- Order: Alteromonadales
- Family: Alteromonadaceae
- Genus: Aestuariibacter
- Species: A. aggregatus

Binomial name
- Aestuariibacter aggregatus Wang et al. 2010

Type strain
- CGMCC 1.8995, DSM 23094, LMG 25283, WH169, Zhang WH169

Species of bacterium

Aestuariibacter aggregatus is a gram-negative, strictly aerobic, non-spore-forming, catalase- and oxidase-positive, from the genus of Aestuariibacter with a single polar flagellum which was isolated from the Yellow Sea in China.
