= Catenovulum maritimum =

Scientific classification
- Domain: Bacteria
- Kingdom: Pseudomonadati
- Phylum: Pseudomonadota
- Class: Gammaproteobacteria
- Order: Alteromonadales
- Family: Alteromonadaceae
- Genus: Catenovulum
- Species: C. maritimum

Binomial name
- Catenovulum maritimum Li et al. 2016

Type strain
- CICC 10836, DSM 28813, strain Q1

Synonyms
- Catenovulum maritimus

Species of bacterium

Catenovulum maritimum is a Gram-negative, heterotrophic and facultatively anaerobic bacterium from the genus Catenovulum which has been isolated from surface of the alga Porphyra yezoensis from Weihai in China.
