= Paraglaciecola polaris =

Scientific classification
- Domain: Bacteria
- Kingdom: Pseudomonadati
- Phylum: Pseudomonadota
- Class: Gammaproteobacteria
- Order: Alteromonadales
- Family: Alteromonadaceae
- Genus: Paraglaciecola
- Species: P. polaris

Binomial name
- Paraglaciecola polaris (Van Trappen et al. 2004) Shivaji and Reddy 2014

Type strain
- ARK 150, CIP 108324, DSM 16457, LMG 21857, R-7215

Synonyms
- Glaciecola polaris

Species of bacterium

Paraglaciecola polaris (syn. Glaciecola polaris) is a strictly aerobic and facultative oligotrophic bacterium from the genus of Paraglaciecola which has been isolated from seawater from the Arctic Ocean.

== Structure ==
It is gram negative, rod shaped and motile with the distinct characteristics of budding and peritrichous prosthecae. Budding can occur on the surface of the cell and/or on the prosthecae. The presence of the branched prosthecae, has an increased surface to volume ratio, so that it can maximize nutrient uptake, due to the low nutrient availability in the polar seas. Lastly, G. polaris has a fatty acid profile similar to other genera to include Alteromonas, Pseudoalteromonas and Glaciecola.

== Genetics ==
The 16S rRNA gene shows a 98% similarity to Glaciocola mesophila. It has a G+C content of 44.1 mol% and genome size of 5.24 Mb.

== Metabolism ==
The Arctic species can be cultured on Marine agar and R2A agar with NaCl. It grows between 5 °C - 37 °C and up to 10% NaCl. It is chemoheterotrophic and can utilize a number of nutrient sources including, but not limited to, glucose, mannitol, cellobiose, sucrose, maltose, galactose, fructose, trehalose, mannose, acetate, glycogen, dextrin, lactate, propionate, glutamate, and malate In addition, it hydrolyzes egg yolk, starch, aesculin, and DNA, but does not reduce nitrate.
