= Microbulbifer salipaludis =

Scientific classification
- Domain: Bacteria
- Kingdom: Pseudomonadati
- Phylum: Pseudomonadota
- Class: Gammaproteobacteria
- Order: Alteromonadales
- Family: Alteromonadaceae
- Genus: Microbulbifer
- Species: M. salipaludis

Binomial name
- Microbulbifer salipaludis Yoon et al. 2003

Species of bacterium

Microbulbifer salipaludis is a moderate halophilic bacteria. It is Gram-negative, non-motile, non-spore-forming and rod-shaped. The type strain of the species is strain SM-1^{T} (=KCCM 41586^{T} =JCM 11542^{T}).
