= Marinobacterium zhoushanense =

Scientific classification
- Domain: Bacteria
- Kingdom: Pseudomonadati
- Phylum: Pseudomonadota
- Class: Gammaproteobacteria
- Order: Alteromonadales
- Family: Alteromonadaceae
- Genus: Marinobacterium
- Species: M. zhoushanense

Binomial name
- Marinobacterium zhoushanense Han et al. 2016

Type strain
- CGMCC 1.15341, KCTC 42782, WM3

Species of bacterium

Marinobacterium zhoushanense is a Gram-negative, facultatively anaerobic and motile bacterium from the genus of Marinobacterium with a single polar flagellum which has been isolated from seawater from the East China Sea.
