= Marinobacterium halophilum =

Scientific classification
- Domain: Bacteria
- Kingdom: Pseudomonadati
- Phylum: Pseudomonadota
- Class: Gammaproteobacteria
- Order: Alteromonadales
- Family: Alteromonadaceae
- Genus: Marinobacterium
- Species: M. halophilum

Binomial name
- Marinobacterium halophilum Chang et al. 2007

Species of bacterium

Marinobacterium halophilum is a species of Gram-negative bacterium from the family Alteromonadaceae. It was first isolated from a tidal flat area of Dae-Chun, Chung-Nam, Korea.
