= Salinimonas sediminis =

Scientific classification
- Domain: Bacteria
- Kingdom: Pseudomonadati
- Phylum: Pseudomonadota
- Class: Gammaproteobacteria
- Order: Alteromonadales
- Family: Alteromonadaceae
- Genus: Salinimonas
- Species: S. sediminis

Binomial name
- Salinimonas sediminis Cao et al. 2018

Type strain
- N102T, KCTC 62440, MCCC 1K03497

Species of bacterium

Salinimonas sediminis is a Gram-negative, rod-shaped slightly halophilic and piezophilic bacterium from the genus of Salinimonas which has been isolated from sediments from a deep of 4700 meter from the New Britain Trench.
