= Microbulbifer aestuariivivens =

Scientific classification
- Domain: Bacteria
- Kingdom: Pseudomonadati
- Phylum: Pseudomonadota
- Class: Gammaproteobacteria
- Order: Alteromonadales
- Family: Alteromonadaceae
- Genus: Microbulbifer
- Species: M. aestuariivivens

Binomial name
- Microbulbifer aestuariivivens Park et al. 2017

Type strain
- KCTC 52569, GHTF-23, NBRC 112533

Species of bacterium

Microbulbifer aestuariivivens is a Gram-negative, aerobic and non-motile bacterium from the genus of Microbulbifer which has been isolated from tidal flat sediments from the South Sea in Korea.
