= Agarivorans gilvus =

Scientific classification
- Domain: Bacteria
- Kingdom: Pseudomonadati
- Phylum: Pseudomonadota
- Class: Gammaproteobacteria
- Order: Alteromonadales
- Family: Alteromonadaceae
- Genus: Agarivorans
- Species: A. gilvus

Binomial name
- Agarivorans gilvus Du et al. 2011

Type strain
- WH0801, CGMCC 1.10131, NRRL B-59247

Species of bacterium

Agarivorans gilvus is a Gram-negative, non-endospore-forming and agarase-producin, bacterium from the genus of Agarivorans which has been isolated from seaweed from Weihai in China.
