= Marinobacterium stanieri =

Scientific classification
- Domain: Bacteria
- Kingdom: Pseudomonadati
- Phylum: Pseudomonadota
- Class: Gammaproteobacteria
- Order: Alteromonadales
- Family: Alteromonadaceae
- Genus: Marinobacterium
- Species: M. stanieri

Binomial name
- Marinobacterium stanieri (Baumann et al. 1983); Satomi et al. 2002

Synonyms
- Pseudomonas stanieri Baumann et al. 1983

Species of bacterium

Marinobacterium stanieri is a Gram-negative bacterium found in sea water. The name Pseudomonas stanieri is a synonym.
