= Marinobacterium lutimaris =

Scientific classification
- Domain: Bacteria
- Kingdom: Pseudomonadati
- Phylum: Pseudomonadota
- Class: Gammaproteobacteria
- Order: Alteromonadales
- Family: Alteromonadaceae
- Genus: Marinobacterium
- Species: M. lutimaris

Binomial name
- Marinobacterium lutimaris Kim et al. 2010

Type strain
- AN9, DSM 22012, KACC 13703

Species of bacterium

Marinobacterium lutimaris is a Gram-negative and moderately halophilic bacterium from the genus of Marinobacterium which has been isolated from tidal flat from the coast of Taean in Korea.
