= Marinobacterium mangrovicola =

Scientific classification
- Domain: Bacteria
- Kingdom: Pseudomonadati
- Phylum: Pseudomonadota
- Class: Gammaproteobacteria
- Order: Alteromonadales
- Family: Alteromonadaceae
- Genus: Marinobacterium
- Species: M. mangrovicola

Binomial name
- Marinobacterium mangrovicola Alfaro-Espinoza and Ullrich 2014

Type strain
- CIP 110653, DSM 27697, Gal22

Species of bacterium

Marinobacterium mangrovicola is a nitrogen-fixing, Gram-negative and motile bacterium from the genus of Marinobacterium which has been isolated from the roots of the mangrove Rhizophora mangle from an aquarium in Germany.
