= Aliagarivorans marinus =

Scientific classification
- Domain: Bacteria
- Kingdom: Pseudomonadati
- Phylum: Pseudomonadota
- Class: Gammaproteobacteria
- Order: Alteromonadales
- Family: Alteromonadaceae
- Genus: Aliagarivorans
- Species: A. marinus

Binomial name
- Aliagarivorans marinus Jean et al. 2009

Type strain
- AAM1, BCRC 17888, DSM 23064, JCM 15522

Species of bacterium

Aliagarivorans marinus is a Gram-negative, heterotrophic, facultatively anaerobic and agarolytic bacterium from the genus of Aliagarivorans which has been isolated from seawater from the An-Ping Harbour in Taiwan.
