= Alishewanella jeotgali =

Scientific classification
- Domain: Bacteria
- Kingdom: Pseudomonadati
- Phylum: Pseudomonadota
- Class: Gammaproteobacteria
- Order: Alteromonadales
- Family: Alteromonadaceae
- Genus: Alishewanella
- Species: A. jeotgali

Binomial name
- Alishewanella jeotgali Kim et al. 2009

Type strain
- JCM 15561, KCTC 22429, MS1

Species of bacterium

Alishewanella jeotgali is a Gram-negative and facultative anaerobic bacterium from the genus of Alishewanella which has been isolated from gajami sikhae (jeotgal) from Korea.
