= Paraglaciecola aquimarina =

Scientific classification
- Domain: Bacteria
- Kingdom: Pseudomonadati
- Phylum: Pseudomonadota
- Class: Gammaproteobacteria
- Order: Alteromonadales
- Family: Alteromonadaceae
- Genus: Paraglaciecola
- Species: P. aquimarina

Binomial name
- Paraglaciecola aquimarina (Park and Yoon 2013) Shivaji and Reddy 2014

Type strain
- CCUG 62918, GGW-M5, KCTC 32108

Synonyms
- Glaciecola aquimarina

Species of bacterium

Paraglaciecola aquimarina is a Gram-negative, aerobic and non-motile bacterium from the genus of Paraglaciecola which has been isolated from seawater from the coast of Korea.
