= Marinobacterium georgiense =

Scientific classification
- Domain: Bacteria
- Kingdom: Pseudomonadati
- Phylum: Pseudomonadota
- Class: Gammaproteobacteria
- Order: Alteromonadales
- Family: Alteromonadaceae
- Genus: Marinobacterium
- Species: M. georgiense

Binomial name
- Marinobacterium georgiense (González et al. 1997) Satomi et al. 2002

Synonyms
- Pseudomonas iners

Species of bacterium

Marinobacterium georgiense is a species of Gram-negative bacterium from the family Alteromonadaceae. M. georgiense is strictly aerobic.
