= Catenovulum sediminis =

Scientific classification
- Domain: Bacteria
- Kingdom: Pseudomonadati
- Phylum: Pseudomonadota
- Class: Gammaproteobacteria
- Order: Alteromonadales
- Family: Alteromonadaceae
- Genus: Catenovulum
- Species: C. sediminis

Binomial name
- Catenovulum sediminis Shi et al. 2017

Type strain
- KCTC 42869, MCCC 1H00129, strain D2

Species of bacterium

Catenovulum sediminis is a Gram-negative, strictly aerobic, rod-shaped and motile bacterium from the genus Catenovulum which has been isolated from sediments from the coast of Weihai in China.
