= Agarivorans albus =

Scientific classification
- Domain: Bacteria
- Kingdom: Pseudomonadati
- Phylum: Pseudomonadota
- Class: Gammaproteobacteria
- Order: Alteromonadales
- Family: Alteromonadaceae
- Genus: Agarivorans
- Species: A. albus

Binomial name
- Agarivorans albus Kurahashi and Yokota 2004

Type strain
- CIP 108457, IAM 14998, JCM 21469, LMG 21761, MKT106, NBRC 102603

Species of bacterium

Agarivorans albus is a Gram-negative, strictly aerobic and mesophilic bacterium from the genus of Agarivorans which has been isolated from the coast of Kanto in Japan.
