= Marinobacterium profundum =

Scientific classification
- Domain: Bacteria
- Kingdom: Pseudomonadati
- Phylum: Pseudomonadota
- Class: Gammaproteobacteria
- Order: Alteromonadales
- Family: Alteromonadaceae
- Genus: Marinobacterium
- Species: M. profundum

Binomial name
- Marinobacterium profundum Hwang et al. 2016

Type strain
- JCM 30410, KCCM 43095, PAMC 27536

Species of bacterium

Marinobacterium profundum is a Gram-negative, rod-shaped and motile bacterium from the genus of Marinobacterium which has been isolated from deep-sea sediments from the Sea of Japan in Korea.
