= Aestuariibacter halophilus =

Scientific classification
- Domain: Bacteria
- Kingdom: Pseudomonadati
- Phylum: Pseudomonadota
- Class: Gammaproteobacteria
- Order: Alteromonadales
- Family: Alteromonadaceae
- Genus: Aestuariibacter
- Species: A. halophilus

Binomial name
- Aestuariibacter halophilus Yi et al. 2004

Type strain
- CIP 108412, DSM 15266, IMSNU 14007, JC2043, KCTC 12043

Species of bacterium

Aestuariibacter halophilus is a gram-negative, strictly aerobic, halophilic, catalase- and oxidase-positive, rod-shaped bacterium from the genus of motile Aestuariibacter with a single polar flagellum which was isolated from the Ganghwa island in Korea.
