= Marinobacterium aestuariivivens =

Scientific classification
- Domain: Bacteria
- Kingdom: Pseudomonadati
- Phylum: Pseudomonadota
- Class: Gammaproteobacteria
- Order: Alteromonadales
- Family: Alteromonadaceae
- Genus: Marinobacterium
- Species: M. aestuariivivens

Binomial name
- Marinobacterium aestuariivivens Park et al. 2016

Type strain
- KCTC 42778, DB-1, NBRC 111756

Species of bacterium

Marinobacterium aestuariivivens is a Gram-negative, aerobic and motile bacterium from the genus of Marinobacterium which has been isolated from tidal flat from the Yellow Sea in Korea.
