= Marinobacterium marisflavi =

Scientific classification
- Domain: Bacteria
- Kingdom: Pseudomonadati
- Phylum: Pseudomonadota
- Class: Gammaproteobacteria
- Order: Alteromonadales
- Family: Alteromonadaceae
- Genus: Marinobacterium
- Species: M. marisflavi

Binomial name
- Marinobacterium marisflavi Kim et al. 2014

Type strain
- IMCC 4074, KCTC 12757, LMG 24660, NBRC 104634

Synonyms
- Marinobacterium marisflavum

Species of bacterium

Marinobacterium marisflavi is a Gram-negative, strictly aerobic, chemoheterotrophic, slightly halophilic and motile bacterium from the genus of Marinobacterium which has been isolated from seawater from the Yellow Sea near Incheon Port.
