= Microbulbifer elongatus =

Scientific classification
- Domain: Bacteria
- Kingdom: Pseudomonadati
- Phylum: Pseudomonadota
- Class: Gammaproteobacteria
- Order: Alteromonadales
- Family: Alteromonadaceae
- Genus: Microbulbifer
- Species: M. elongatus

Binomial name
- Microbulbifer elongatus (Humm 1946); Yoon et al. 2003

Synonyms
- Pseudomonas elongata Humm 1946

Species of bacterium

Microbulbifer elongatus is a Gram-negative marine bacterium from the family Alteromonadaceae. The species was previously called Pseudomonas elongata, before 16S rRNA found that it was more closely related to bacteria from the genus Microbulbifer.
