= Microbulbifer yueqingensis =

Scientific classification
- Domain: Bacteria
- Kingdom: Pseudomonadati
- Phylum: Pseudomonadota
- Class: Gammaproteobacteria
- Order: Alteromonadales
- Family: Alteromonadaceae
- Genus: Microbulbifer
- Species: M. yueqingensis

Binomial name
- Microbulbifer yueqingensis Zhang et al. 2012

Species of bacterium

Microbulbifer yueqingensis is a Gram-negative, aerobic bacterium found in marine sediment. Its type strain is Y226^{T} (=CGMCC 1.10658^{T} =JCM 17212^{T}).
