= Aequorivita sinensis =

Scientific classification
- Domain: Bacteria
- Kingdom: Pseudomonadati
- Phylum: Bacteroidota
- Class: Flavobacteriia
- Order: Flavobacteriales
- Family: Flavobacteriaceae
- Genus: Aequorivita
- Species: A. sinensis

Binomial name
- Aequorivita sinensis Wang et al. 2020

Type strain
- S1-10

Species of bacterium

Aequorivita sinensis is a Gram-negative, facultatively anaerobic, rod-shaped and non-motile bacterium from the genus of Aequorivita which has been isolated from marine sediments.
