= Gramella =

Scientific classification
- Domain: Bacteria
- Kingdom: Pseudomonadati
- Phylum: Bacteroidota
- Class: Flavobacteriia
- Order: Flavobacteriales
- Family: Flavobacteriaceae
- Genus: Gramella; Nedashkovskaya et al. 2005

Species
- G. aestuarii G. aestuariivivens G. antarctica G. aquimixticola G. bathymodioli G. echinicola G. flava G. forsetii G. fulva G. gaetbulicola G. jeungdoensis G. lutea G. marina G. oceani G. planctonica G. portivictoriae G. sabulilitoris G. salexigens G. sediminilitoris

Bacterium

Gramella is a genus of bacteria from the family of Flavobacteriaceae. Gramella is named after the Danish pharmacologist Hans Christian Gram.
