= Aliiglaciecola litoralis =

Scientific classification
- Domain: Bacteria
- Kingdom: Pseudomonadati
- Phylum: Pseudomonadota
- Class: Gammaproteobacteria
- Order: Alteromonadales
- Family: Alteromonadaceae
- Genus: Aliiglaciecola
- Species: A. litoralis

Binomial name
- Aliiglaciecola litoralis (Tanaka et al. 2010) Jean et al. 2013

Type strain
- JCM 15896, KMM 3894, L. A. Romanenko Sd 2-38, NRIC 0754

Species of bacterium

Aliiglaciecola litoralis is a gram-negative, aerobic, non-pigmented, catalase- and oxidase-positive, rod-shaped motile bacterium from the genus of Aliiglaciecola which was isolated from a marine sandy sample of the Sea of Japan. Aestuariibacter litoralis has been reclassified to Aliiglaciecola litoralis.
