= Rotten ice =

Melting or otherwise disintegrating ice on open water

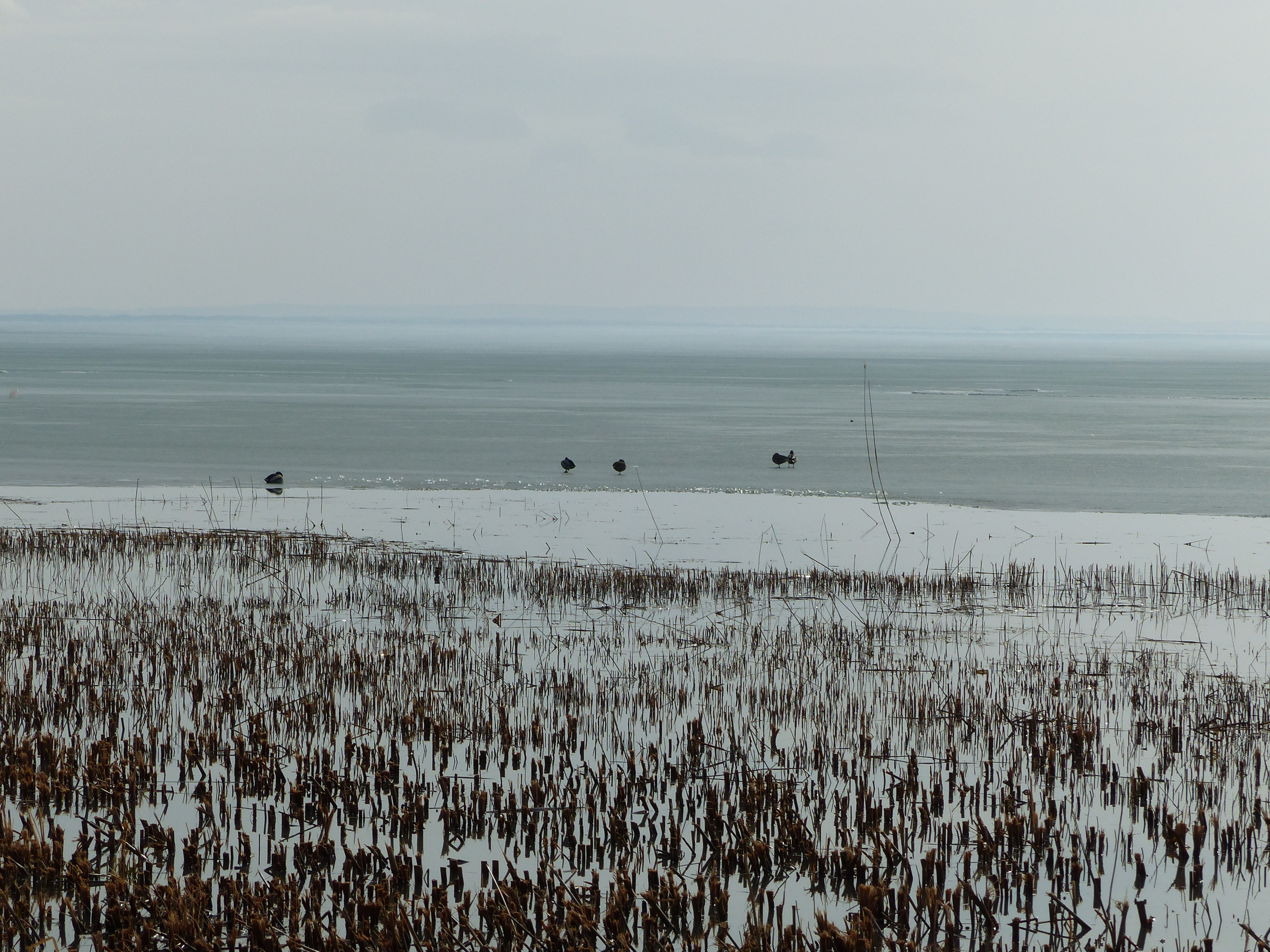
Rotten ice melting on Lake Balaton

Rotten ice or candle ice is a loose term for ice that is melting or structurally disintegrating due to being honeycombed by liquid water, air, or contaminants trapped between the initial growth of ice crystals. It may appear transparent or splotchy grey, and it is generally found after spring or summer thaws, presenting a danger to those traveling or spending time in outdoor recreation. The increase of rotten ice vs. solid ice in the Arctic affects ocean-atmosphere heat transfer and year-to-year ice formation, as well as the lives of the Inuit, sea mammals such as walrus and polar bear, and the microorganisms that live inside the ice.

Rotten ice has a subtype called "candle ice", which has a columnar structure. Like other rotten ice, it poses a hazard to humans due to its lack of structure.

== Properties and life cycle ==
Compared to solid ice, rotten ice has "high porosity and enhanced permeability." This porosity facilitates "large convective transport of nutrients, salt and heat at the onset of fall freeze-up", which algal bloom may also contribute. It forms on open water when snowpack and ice are mixed together or when polar ice melts during the spring or summer. If saturated with water, rotten ice may look dark or transparent, similar to new black ice, but otherwise it may look grey and splotchy. Though rotten ice may appear strong, it is weak—even several feet thick may not hold a person's weight. On land, it is difficult or impossible to climb.

Rotting may begin at the top or bottom surface and occurs due to absorption of heat from the sun. In general, ice melting may accelerate due to various factors. Water from underneath the ice can erode the ice and cause it to be thinner without a sign on the surface. Runoff from upstream melting, roads (especially salted), and snow can weaken the ice, and "tree stumps, rocks and docks absorb heat from the sun, causing ice around them to melt." Ice may melt faster along shorelines. Ice under a layer of snow will be thinner and weaker due to the snow's insulating effect; a new snowfall can also warm up and melt existing ice. However, snow or snow ice may also absorb or reflect incoming solar radiation and prevent rotting until the snow is melted. Regardless of thickness, ice will be weakened by multiple freezes and thaws or layers of snow inside the ice itself. It melts more quickly than solid ice.

Certain types of bacteria in rotten ice pores produce polymer-like substances, which may influence the physical properties of the ice. A team from the University of Washington studying this phenomenon hypothesizes that the polymers may provide a stabilizing effect to the ice. However, other scientists have found algae and other microorganisms produce pigments or help create a substance, cryoconite, all of which increase rotting and further the growth of the microorganisms.

== Role in climate science ==
In 2009, researchers studying the Beaufort Sea north of Alaska found that most of the ice present had become rotten ice, instead of thick, solid ice that had either been newly formed or present for multiple years. This decline in multiyear ice contradicted previous impressions that Arctic ice was recovering from climate change and "had implications for climate science and marine vessel transport in the Arctic." Other research has found that the increased permeability of rotten ice can "contribute to ocean–atmosphere heat transfer." Future increases of rotten ice matter influence long-term ice cover: "If the ice melts completely, then the open ocean will form new ice in the autumn. Only ice remaining at the end of summer can become second-year and subsequently multiyear ice." As rotten ice exposes more of the ocean, it also creates a feedback loop where the exposed darker ocean absorbs more heat, which melts more ice and exposes more ocean.

In the years leading up to 2015, Greenland's ice cover has decreased to "a rotten ice regime", with months of solid ice decreasing from 9 per year to 2–3, and with thickness decreasing from 6–10 feet (1.8–3.0 m) to 7 inches (18 cm) by 2004. The decline of solid land ice to rotten ice strongly disrupts travel and subsistence hunting for the local Inuit, as well as travel and habitat for sea mammals. In the future, the shedding rotted or melted ice may affect coastlines of other continents via rising sea levels.

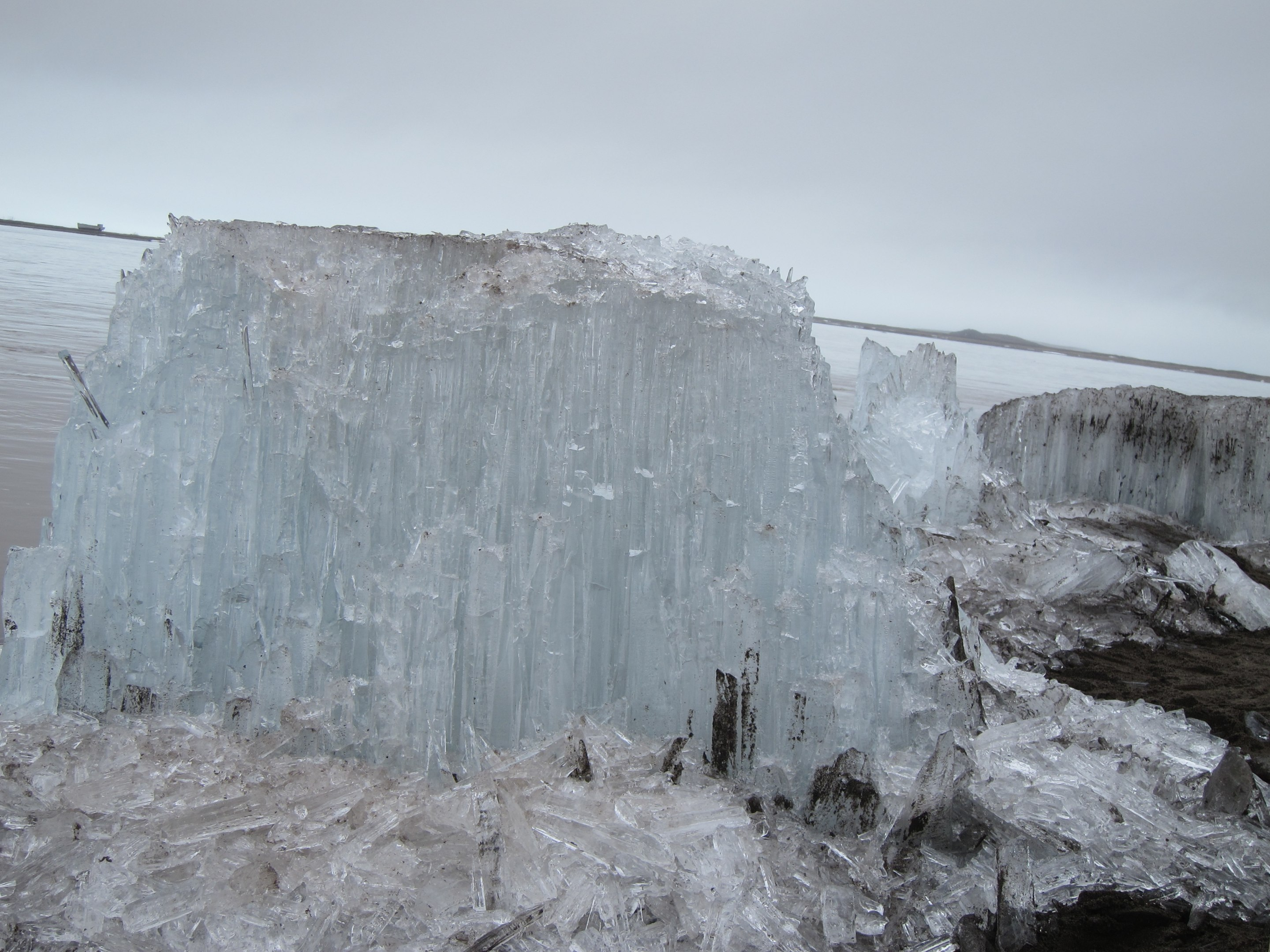
Candle ice in Canada

== Candle ice ==
Candle ice (sometimes known as needle ice) is a form of rotten ice that develops in columns perpendicular to the surface of a lake or other body of water. It makes a clinking sound when the "candles" are broken apart and floating in the water, bumping up against each other. As ice from a larger surface melts, the formation of candle ice "progressively increases with time, temperature, and quantity of water melt runoff." This occurs due to the hexagonal structure of the ice crystals; minerals such as salt, as well as other contaminants, can be trapped between the crystals when they initially form, and melting will begin at these boundaries due to the trapped contaminants. No matter the thickness, it can be dangerous due to its lack of horizontal structure, which means there will be no rim to grab for any person who falls through.

== See also ==
- Polar ice cap
- Sea ice
- Sea ice microbial communities
- Frazil ice
