= Aequorivita crocea =

Scientific classification
- Domain: Bacteria
- Kingdom: Pseudomonadati
- Phylum: Bacteroidota
- Class: Flavobacteriia
- Order: Flavobacteriales
- Family: Flavobacteriaceae
- Genus: Aequorivita
- Species: A. crocea

Binomial name
- Aequorivita crocea Bowman and Nichols 2002

Type strain
- ACAM 642, Bowman Y12-2, CIP 107456, DSM 14293, LMG 21433, Y12-2

Species of bacterium

Aequorivita crocea is a Gram-negative, psychrotolerant, strictly aerobic, rod-shaped, chemoheterotrophic and non-motile bacterium from the genus of Aequorivita which has been isolated from the Antarctic.
