= Gramella jeungdoensis =

Scientific classification
- Domain: Bacteria
- Kingdom: Pseudomonadati
- Phylum: Bacteroidota
- Class: Flavobacteriia
- Order: Flavobacteriales
- Family: Flavobacteriaceae
- Genus: Gramella
- Species: G. jeungdoensis

Binomial name
- Gramella jeungdoensis Joung et al. 2011

Type strain
- HMD3159

Bacterium in genus Gramella

Gramella jeungdoensis is a Gram-negative, rod-shaped and non-motile bacterium from the genus of Gramella which has been isolated from a solar saltern in Korea.
