= Aliiglaciecola =

Marinobacter

Scientific classification
- Domain: Bacteria
- Kingdom: Pseudomonadati
- Phylum: Pseudomonadota
- Class: Gammaproteobacteria
- Order: Alteromonadales
- Family: Alteromonadaceae
- Genus: Aliiglaciecola; Jean et al. 2013

Type species
- Aliiglaciecola lipolytica

Species
- A. aliphaticivorans A. lipolytica A. litoralis

Genus of bacteria

Aliiglaciecola is a genus of gram-negative bacteria from the family of Alteromonadaceae. As of 2026, the genus contains 3 validly published species.
