= Aliiglaciecola lipolytica =

Scientific classification
- Domain: Bacteria
- Kingdom: Pseudomonadati
- Phylum: Pseudomonadota
- Class: Gammaproteobacteria
- Order: Alteromonadales
- Family: Alteromonadaceae
- Genus: Aliiglaciecola
- Species: A. lipolytica

Binomial name
- Aliiglaciecola lipolytica (Chen et al. 2009) Jean et al. 2013

Type strain
- CGMCC 1.7001, JCM 15139, E3

Synonyms
- Glaciecola lipolytica

Species of bacterium

Aliiglaciecola lipolytica is a Gram-negative, non-spore-forming, rod-shaped and motile from the genus of Aliiglaciecola with a single polar flagellum which has been isolated from seawater in China.
