= Aequorivita vladivostokensis =

Scientific classification
- Domain: Bacteria
- Kingdom: Pseudomonadati
- Phylum: Bacteroidota
- Class: Flavobacteriia
- Order: Flavobacteriales
- Family: Flavobacteriaceae
- Genus: Aequorivita
- Species: A. vladivostokensis

Binomial name
- Aequorivita vladivostokensis (Nedashkovskaya et al. 2003) Hahnke et al. 2017

Type strain
- JCM 11732, KMM 3516, NBRC 16718

Synonyms
- Vitellibacter vladivostokensis Vladibacter vitellinus

Species of bacterium

Aequorivita vladivostokensis is a Gram-negative, strictly aerobic, non-spore-forming, heterotrophic and non-motile bacterium from the genus of Aequorivita which has been isolated from the Troitsa Bay from the Sea of Japan.
