= Catenovulum =

Scientific classification
- Domain: Bacteria
- Kingdom: Pseudomonadati
- Phylum: Pseudomonadota
- Class: Gammaproteobacteria
- Order: Alteromonadales
- Family: Alteromonadaceae
- Genus: Catenovulum; Yan et al. 2011

Type species
- Catenovulum agarivorans

Species
- Catenovulum agarivorans Catenovulum maritimum Catenovulum sediminis

Genus of bacteria

Catenovulum is a bacteria genus from the family Alteromonadaceae.
