= Planctobacterium =

Scientific classification
- Domain: Bacteria
- Kingdom: Pseudomonadati
- Phylum: Pseudomonadota
- Class: Gammaproteobacteria
- Order: Alteromonadales
- Family: Alteromonadaceae
- Genus: Planctobacterium; Sheu et al. 2017

Type species
- Planctobacterium marinum

Species
- P. marinum

Genus of bacteria

Planctobacterium is a Gram-negative, aerobic and motile bacteria genus from the family of Alteromonadaceae with one known species (Planctobacterium marinum). Planctobacterium marinum has been isolated from the South China Sea.
