= Marinobacterium =

Scientific classification
- Domain: Bacteria
- Kingdom: Pseudomonadati
- Phylum: Pseudomonadota
- Class: Gammaproteobacteria
- Order: Alteromonadales
- Family: Alteromonadaceae
- Genus: Marinobacterium; González et al. 1997

Species
- M. aestuariivivens M. coralli M. georgiense M. halophilum M. jannaschii M. litorale M. lutimaris M. mangrovicola M. marisflavi M. maritimum M. nitratireducens M. profundum M. rhizophilum M. sediminicola M. stanieri M. zhoushanense

Genus of bacteria

Marinobacterium is a genus of bacteria found in sea water. The cells are rod-shaped and are motile by using one polar flagellum. S.I. Paul et al. (2021) isolated, characterized and identified two species of Marinobacterium (Marinobacterium coralli, Marinobacterium maritimum) from marine sponges of the Saint Martin's Island Area of the Bay of Bengal, Bangladesh.

== Biochemical characteristics of Marinobacterium ==
Colony, morphological, physiological, and biochemical characteristics of Marinobacterium species are shown in the Table below.

Test type	Test	Characteristics
Colony characters	Size	Pin headed/Small
Colony characters	Type	Round
Colony characters	Color	Opaque
Colony characters	Shape	Convex
Morphological characters	Shape	Rod
Physiological characters	Motility	+
Physiological characters	Growth at 6.5% NaCl	+
Biochemical characters	Gram's staining	–
Biochemical characters	Oxidase	+
Biochemical characters	Catalase	–
Biochemical characters	Oxidative-Fermentative	Oxidative
Biochemical characters	Motility	+
Biochemical characters	Methyl Red	–
Biochemical characters	Voges-Proskauer	+
Biochemical characters	Indole	–
Biochemical characters	H_{2}S Production	–
Biochemical characters	Urease	–
Biochemical characters	Nitrate reductase	–
Biochemical characters	β-Galactosidase	V
Hydrolysis of	Gelatin	V
Hydrolysis of	Aesculin	+
Hydrolysis of	Casein	+
Hydrolysis of	Tween 40	V
Hydrolysis of	Tween 60	V
Hydrolysis of	Tween 80	V
Acid production from	Glycerol	+
Acid production from	Galactose	+
Acid production from	D-Glucose	V
Acid production from	D-Fructose	+
Acid production from	D-Mannose	+
Acid production from	Mannitol	+
Acid production from	N-Acetylglucosamine	V
Acid production from	Amygdalin	+
Acid production from	Maltose	+
Acid production from	D-Melibiose	+
Acid production from	D-Trehalose	+
Acid production from	Glycogen	+
Acid production from	D-Turanose	V

Note: + = Positive; – =Negative; V =Variable (+/–)
