= Gramella sediminilitoris =

Scientific classification
- Domain: Bacteria
- Kingdom: Pseudomonadati
- Phylum: Bacteroidota
- Class: Flavobacteriia
- Order: Flavobacteriales
- Family: Flavobacteriaceae
- Genus: Gramella
- Species: G. sediminilitoris

Binomial name
- Gramella sediminilitoris Park et al. 2016

Type strain
- GHTF-27

Bacterium

Gramella sediminilitoris is a Gram-negative, aerobic, non-spore-forming and motile bacterium from the genus of Gramella which has been isolated from tidal flat from Goheung in Korea.
