= Aestuariibacter salexigens =

Scientific classification
- Domain: Bacteria
- Kingdom: Pseudomonadati
- Phylum: Pseudomonadota
- Class: Gammaproteobacteria
- Order: Alteromonadales
- Family: Alteromonadaceae
- Genus: Aestuariibacter
- Species: A. salexigens

Binomial name
- Aestuariibacter salexigens Yi et al. 2004

Type strain
- CIP 108413, DSM 15300, IMSNU 14006, JC2042, KCTC 12042

Species of bacterium

Aestuariibacter salexigens is a gram-negative, halophilic, strictly aerobic, catalase- and oxidase-positive, rod-shaped, motile bacterium with a polar flagellum from the genus of Aestuariibacter which was isolated from sediment of getbol on the Ganghwa Island in Korea.
