= Gayadomonas =

Scientific classification
- Domain: Bacteria
- Kingdom: Pseudomonadati
- Phylum: Pseudomonadota
- Class: Gammaproteobacteria
- Order: Alteromonadales
- Family: Alteromonadaceae
- Genus: Gayadomonas; Lim et al. 2013

Species
- G. joobiniege

Genus of bacteria

Gayadomonas is a Gram-negative, aerobic, rod-shaped and non-motile bacteria genus from the family of Alteromonadaceae with one known species (Gayadomonas joobiniege). Gayadomonas joobiniege has been isolated from seawater from the Gaya Island in Malaysia.
