= Salimicrobium halophilum =

Scientific classification
- Domain: Bacteria
- Kingdom: Bacillati
- Phylum: Bacillota
- Class: Bacilli
- Order: Bacillales
- Family: Halobacillaceae
- Genus: Salimicrobium
- Species: S. halophilum

Binomial name
- Salimicrobium halophilum (Ventosa et al. 1990) Yoon et al. 2007

Type strain
- ATCC 49085, CCM 4074, CGMCC 1.3409, DSM 4771, HAMBI 2106, IAM 14939, JCM 12305, KCTC 3566, LMG 17942, N23-2, NBRC 102426

Synonyms
- Bacillus halophilus

Species of bacterium

Salimicrobium halophilum is a moderately halophilic bacterium from the genus of Salimicrobium which has been isolated from rotted wood in Japan.
