= Alkalimarinus =

Scientific classification
- Domain: Bacteria
- Kingdom: Pseudomonadati
- Phylum: Pseudomonadota
- Class: Gammaproteobacteria
- Order: Alteromonadales
- Family: Alteromonadaceae
- Genus: Alkalimarinus; Zhao et al. 2015

Type species
- Alkalimarinus sediminis

Species
- A. sediminis

Genus of bacteria

Alkalimarinus is a Gram-negative genus of bacteria from the class of Alteromonadaceae with one known species (Alkalimarinus sediminis). Alkalimarinus sediminis has been isolated from sediments from the coast of Weihai in China.
