= Gramella marina =

Scientific classification
- Domain: Bacteria
- Kingdom: Pseudomonadati
- Phylum: Bacteroidota
- Class: Flavobacteriia
- Order: Flavobacteriales
- Family: Flavobacteriaceae
- Genus: Gramella
- Species: G. marina

Binomial name
- Gramella marina Nedashkovskaya et al. 2010

Type strain
- KMM 6048

Bacterium

Gramella marina is a Gram-negative, aerobic and heterotrophic bacterium from the genus of Gramella which has been isolated from the sea urchin Strongylocentrotus intermedius.
