= Aequorivita capsosiphonis =

Scientific classification
- Domain: Bacteria
- Kingdom: Pseudomonadati
- Phylum: Bacteroidota
- Class: Flavobacteriia
- Order: Flavobacteriales
- Family: Flavobacteriaceae
- Genus: Aequorivita
- Species: A. capsosiphonis

Binomial name
- Aequorivita capsosiphonis Park et al. 2009

Type strain
- DSM 23843, JCM 15070, KCTC 22183, A71

Synonyms
- Aequorivita marinus

Species of bacterium

Aequorivita capsosiphonis is a Gram-negative and aerobic bacterium from the genus of Aequorivita which has been isolated from the alga Capsosiphon fulvescens from the South Sea in Korea.
