= Gramella planctonica =

Scientific classification
- Domain: Bacteria
- Kingdom: Pseudomonadati
- Phylum: Bacteroidota
- Class: Flavobacteriia
- Order: Flavobacteriales
- Family: Flavobacteriaceae
- Genus: Gramella
- Species: G. planctonica

Binomial name
- Gramella planctonica Shahina et al. 2014

Type strain
- CC-AMWZ-3

Bacterium

Gramella planctonica is a Gram-negative, strictly aerobic, non-spore-forming and rod-shaped bacterium from the genus of Gramella.
