= Aequorivita sublithincola =

Scientific classification
- Domain: Bacteria
- Kingdom: Pseudomonadati
- Phylum: Bacteroidota
- Class: Flavobacteriia
- Order: Flavobacteriales
- Family: Flavobacteriaceae
- Genus: Aequorivita
- Species: A. sublithincola

Binomial name
- Aequorivita sublithincola Bowman and Nichols 2002

Type strain
- 9-3, ACAM 643, CIP 107454, DSM 14238, LMG 21432, QSSC9-3

Species of bacterium

Aequorivita sublithincola is a bacterium from the genus of Aequorivita which has been isolated from a quartz stone from the Antarctica.
