= Paraglaciecola =

Scientific classification
- Domain: Bacteria
- Kingdom: Pseudomonadati
- Phylum: Pseudomonadota
- Class: Gammaproteobacteria
- Order: Alteromonadales
- Family: Alteromonadaceae
- Genus: Paraglaciecola; Shivaji and Reddy 2014

Type species
- Paraglaciecola mesophila

Species
- P. aestuariivivens P. algarum P. aquimarina P. arctica P. chathamensis P. hydrolytica P. marina P. mesophila P. polaris P. psychrophila

Genus of bacteria

Paraglaciecola is a genus of bacteria from the family Alteromonadaceae.
