= Gramella oceani =

Scientific classification
- Domain: Bacteria
- Kingdom: Pseudomonadati
- Phylum: Bacteroidota
- Class: Flavobacteriia
- Order: Flavobacteriales
- Family: Flavobacteriaceae
- Genus: Gramella
- Species: G. oceani

Binomial name
- Gramella oceani Hameed et al. 2014

Type strain
- CC-AMSZ-T

Bacterium

Gramella oceani is a Gram-negative, strictly aerobic, non-endospore-forming and rod-shaped bacterium from the genus of Gramella which has been isolated from marine sediments from the coast from Kending in Taiwan. Gramella oceani produces zeaxanthin.
