= Neptunicella =

Scientific classification
- Domain: Bacteria
- Kingdom: Pseudomonadati
- Phylum: Pseudomonadota
- Class: Gammaproteobacteria
- Order: Alteromonadales
- Family: Alteromonadaceae
- Genus: Neptunicella; Liu et al. 2018

Type species
- Neptunicella marina

Species
- N. marina

Genus of bacteria

Neptunicella is a Gram-negative, aerobic and motile bacteria genus from the family of Alteromonadaceae with one known species (Neptunicella marina). Neptunicella marina has been isolated from seawater from the Indian Ocean.
