= Gramella sabulilitoris =

Scientific classification
- Domain: Bacteria
- Kingdom: Pseudomonadati
- Phylum: Bacteroidota
- Class: Flavobacteriia
- Order: Flavobacteriales
- Family: Flavobacteriaceae
- Genus: Gramella
- Species: G. sabulilitoris

Binomial name
- Gramella sabulilitoris Park et al. 2020

Type strain
- HSMS-1

Bacterium

Gramella sabulilitoris is a Gram-negative, aerobic non-spore-forming, rod-shaped and motile bacterium from the genus of Gramella which has been isolated from sand from the Yellow Sea in Korea.
