= Gramella aestuariivivens =

Scientific classification
- Domain: Bacteria
- Kingdom: Pseudomonadati
- Phylum: Bacteroidota
- Class: Flavobacteriia
- Order: Flavobacteriales
- Family: Flavobacteriaceae
- Genus: Gramella
- Species: G. aestuariivivens

Binomial name
- Gramella aestuariivivens Park et al. 2015

Type strain
- BG-MY13

Synonyms
- Gramella aestuariiviva

Bacterium

Gramella aestuariivivens is a Gram-negative, aerobic and non-spore-forming bacterium from the genus of Gramella which has been isolated from tidal flat sediments from the South Sea in Korea.
