= Aequorivita aestuarii =

Scientific classification
- Domain: Bacteria
- Kingdom: Pseudomonadati
- Phylum: Bacteroidota
- Class: Flavobacteriia
- Order: Flavobacteriales
- Family: Flavobacteriaceae
- Genus: Aequorivita
- Species: A. aestuarii

Binomial name
- Aequorivita aestuarii (Kim et al. 2010) Hahnke et al. 2017

Type strain
- IMSNU 14137, JCM 15496, KACC 13727, KCTC 22361, KCTC 22361

Synonyms
- Vitellibacter aestuarii

Species of bacterium

Aequorivita aestuarii is a Gram-negative and aerobic bacterium from the genus of Aequorivita which has been isolated from tidal-flat sediments from the Oki Island in Korea.
