= Salimicrobium =

Scientific classification
- Domain: Bacteria
- Kingdom: Bacillati
- Phylum: Bacillota
- Class: Bacilli
- Order: Bacillales
- Family: Halobacillaceae
- Genus: Salimicrobium; Yoon, Kang & Oh 2007

Type species
- Salimicrobium album (Hao, Kocur & Komagata 1985) Yoon, Kang & Oh 2007

Species
- S. album; S. flavidum; S. halophilum; "S. humidisoli"; S. jeotgali; S. luteum; S. salexigens

Synonyms
- Yeomjeonicoccus

Genus of bacteria

Salimicrobium is a genus of bacteria from the family Bacillaceae.

== Phylogeny ==
The currently accepted taxonomy is based on the List of Prokaryotic names with Standing in Nomenclature (LPSN) and National Center for Biotechnology Information (NCBI).

16S rRNA based LTP_10_2024

- Salimicrobium
  - S. album (Hao, Kocur & Komagata 1985) Yoon, Kang & Oh 2007
  - - S. salexigens de la Haba et al. 2011
    - - S. jeotgali Choi et al. 2014
      - - S. flavidum Yoon et al. 2009
        - - S. halophilum (Ventosa et al. 1990) Yoon, Kang & Oh 2007
          - S. luteum Yoon, Kang & Oh 2007

120 marker proteins based GTDB 09-RS220

- Salimicrobium
  - S. halophilum
  - - S. flavidum
    - - S. album [incl. S. salexigens; S. jeotgali]
      - "S. humidisoli" Xiong et al. 2021

== See also ==
- List of Bacteria genera
- List of bacterial orders
