= Gramella aquimixticola =

Scientific classification
- Domain: Bacteria
- Kingdom: Pseudomonadati
- Phylum: Bacteroidota
- Class: Flavobacteriia
- Order: Flavobacteriales
- Family: Flavobacteriaceae
- Genus: Gramella
- Species: G. aquimixticola

Binomial name
- Gramella aquimixticola Park et al. 2015

Type strain
- HJM-19

Bacterium

Gramella aquimixticola is a Gram-negative, non-spore-forming aerobic and motile bacterium from the genus of Gramella which has been isolated from estuary water from Hwajinpo in Korea.
