= Aequorivita =

Scientific classification
- Domain: Bacteria
- Kingdom: Pseudomonadati
- Phylum: Bacteroidota
- Class: Flavobacteriia
- Order: Flavobacteriales
- Family: Flavobacteriaceae
- Genus: Aequorivita; Bowman and Nichols 2002

Type species
- Aequorivita antarctica

Species
- A. aestuarii A. antarctica A. capsosiphonis A. echinoideorum A. crocea A. lipolytica A. lutea A. nionensis A. sinensis A. soesokkakensis A. sublithincola A. todarodis A. viscosa A. vladivostokensis

Gram-negative aerobic bacterial genus from the family Flavobacteriaceae

Aequorivita is a Gram-negative and strictly aerobic bacterial genus from the family of Flavobacteriaceae.
