= Salimicrobium flavidum =

Scientific classification
- Domain: Bacteria
- Kingdom: Bacillati
- Phylum: Bacillota
- Class: Bacilli
- Order: Bacillales
- Family: Halobacillaceae
- Genus: Salimicrobium
- Species: S. flavidum

Binomial name
- Salimicrobium flavidum Yoon et al. 2009

Type strain
- CCUG 56755, KCTC 13260, ISL-25

Species of bacterium

Salimicrobium flavidum is a Gram-variable and motile bacterium from the genus of Salimicrobium which has been isolated from sediments of a marine solar saltern from the Yellow Sea in Korea.
