= Gramella antarctica =

Scientific classification
- Domain: Bacteria
- Kingdom: Pseudomonadati
- Phylum: Bacteroidota
- Class: Flavobacteriia
- Order: Flavobacteriales
- Family: Flavobacteriaceae
- Genus: Gramella
- Species: G. antarctica

Binomial name
- Gramella antarctica Li et al. 2018

Type strain
- R17H11

Bacterium

Gramella antarctica is a Gram-negative, rod-shaped aerobic and motile bacterium from the genus of Gramella which has been isolated from surface sediments from the Ross Sea.
