= Aequorivita echinoideorum =

Scientific classification
- Domain: Bacteria
- Kingdom: Pseudomonadati
- Phylum: Bacteroidota
- Class: Flavobacteriia
- Order: Flavobacteriales
- Family: Flavobacteriaceae
- Genus: Aequorivita
- Species: A. echinoideorum

Binomial name
- Aequorivita echinoideorum (Lin et al. 2015) Hahnke et al. 2017

Type strain
- BCRC 80886, JCM 30378, CC-CZW007

Synonyms
- Vitellibacter echinoideorum

Species of bacterium

Aequorivita echinoideorum is a Gram-negative, rod-shaped and aerobic bacterium from the genus of Aequorivita which has been isolated from a sea urchin (Tripneustes gratilla) from Penghu Island in Taiwan.
