= Gramella lutea =

Scientific classification
- Domain: Bacteria
- Kingdom: Pseudomonadati
- Phylum: Bacteroidota
- Class: Flavobacteriia
- Order: Flavobacteriales
- Family: Flavobacteriaceae
- Genus: Gramella
- Species: G. lutea

Binomial name
- Gramella lutea Yoon et al. 2015

Type strain
- YJ019

Bacterium

Gramella lutea is a Gram-negative, aerobic, rod-shaped and non-motile bacterium from the genus of Gramella which has been isolated from marine sediments from Hwangwooji from Jeju Island.
