= Agarivorans =

Scientific classification
- Domain: Bacteria
- Kingdom: Pseudomonadati
- Phylum: Pseudomonadota
- Class: Gammaproteobacteria
- Order: Alteromonadales
- Family: Alteromonadaceae
- Genus: Agarivorans; Kurahashi and Yokota 2004

Type species
- A. albus

Genus of bacteria

Agarivorans is a genus in the phylum Pseudomonadota (Bacteria).

== Etymology ==
The name Agarivorans derives from:
Neo-Latin neuter gender noun agarum, agar; Latin participle adjective vorans, devouring; Neo-Latin masculine gender noun (Neo-Latin masculine gender participle adjective used as a substantive) agarivorans, agar-devouring.

== Species ==
The genus contains 4 species, namely

- A. aestuarii ( Kim et al. 2016 )
- A. albus ( Kurahashi and Yokota 2004, (Type species of the genus).; Latin masculine gender adjective albus, white.)
- A. gilvus ( Du et al. 2011; Latin masculine gender adjective gilvus, pale yellow, referring to the pale yellow pigmentation of the bacterium.)
- A. litoreus ( Park et al. 2015 )

== See also ==
- Bacterial taxonomy
- Microbiology
