= Tamilnaduibacter =

Scientific classification
- Domain: Bacteria
- Kingdom: Pseudomonadati
- Phylum: Pseudomonadota
- Class: Gammaproteobacteria
- Order: Alteromonadales
- Family: Alteromonadaceae
- Genus: Tamilnaduibacter; Verma et al. 2015

Type species
- Tamilnaduibacter salinus

Species
- T. salinus

Genus of bacteria

Tamilnaduibacter is a Gram-negative, halotolerant and rod-shaped bacteria genus from the family of Alteromonadaceae with one known species (Tamilnaduibacter salinus). Tamilnaduibacter salinus has been isolated from sediments from the Thamaraikulam solar salt pan from Tamilnadu in India.
