= Agaribacter =

Scientific classification
- Domain: Bacteria
- Kingdom: Pseudomonadati
- Phylum: Pseudomonadota
- Class: Gammaproteobacteria
- Order: Alteromonadales
- Family: Alteromonadaceae
- Genus: Agaribacter; Teramoto and Nishijima 2014

Type species
- Agaribacter marinus

Species
- A. marinus

Genus of bacteria

Agaribacter is a bacterial genus from the family of Alteromonadaceae. Up to now there is only one species of this genus known (Agaribacter marinus).
