= Alginatibacterium =

Scientific classification
- Domain: Bacteria
- Kingdom: Pseudomonadati
- Phylum: Pseudomonadota
- Class: Gammaproteobacteria
- Order: Alteromonadales
- Family: Alteromonadaceae
- Genus: Alginatibacterium; Wang et al. 2019

Species
- A. sediminis

Genus of bacteria

Alginatibacterium is a Gram-negative, strictly aerobic and rod-shaped bacteria genus from the family of Alteromonadaceae with one known species (Alginatibacterium sediminis). Alginatibacterium sediminis has been isolated from coastal sediments.
