= Salinimonas =

Scientific classification
- Domain: Bacteria
- Kingdom: Pseudomonadati
- Phylum: Pseudomonadota
- Class: Gammaproteobacteria
- Order: Alteromonadales
- Family: Alteromonadaceae
- Genus: Salinimonas; Jeon et al. 2005

Type species
- Salinimonas chungwhensis

Species
- S. chungwhensis S. lutimaris S. sediminis

Genus of bacteria

Salinimonas is a genus that of gram-negative bacteria from the family of Alteromonadaceae.
