= Gramella portivictoriae =

Scientific classification
- Domain: Bacteria
- Kingdom: Pseudomonadati
- Phylum: Bacteroidota
- Class: Flavobacteriia
- Order: Flavobacteriales
- Family: Flavobacteriaceae
- Genus: Gramella
- Species: G. portivictoriae

Binomial name
- Gramella portivictoriae Lau et al. 2005

Type strain
- UST040801-001

Bacterium

Gramella portivictoriae is a Gram-negative, strictly aerobic and rod-shaped bacterium from the genus of Gramella which has been isolated from marine sediments.
