= Salimicrobium jeotgali =

Scientific classification
- Domain: Bacteria
- Kingdom: Bacillati
- Phylum: Bacillota
- Class: Bacilli
- Order: Bacillales
- Family: Halobacillaceae
- Genus: Salimicrobium
- Species: S. jeotgali

Binomial name
- Salimicrobium jeotgali Choi et al. 2014

Type strain
- JCM 19758, KACC 16972, MJ3

Species of bacterium

Salimicrobium jeotgali is a Gram-positive, aerobic and motile bacterium from the genus of Salimicrobium which has been isolated from Myeolchi-jeot from Korea.
