= Aequorivita antarctica =

Scientific classification
- Domain: Bacteria
- Kingdom: Pseudomonadati
- Phylum: Bacteroidota
- Class: Flavobacteriia
- Order: Flavobacteriales
- Family: Flavobacteriaceae
- Genus: Aequorivita
- Species: A. antarctica

Binomial name
- Aequorivita antarctica Bowman and Nichols 2002

Type strain
- ACAM 640, Bowman SW49, CIP 107457, DSM 14231, LMG 21431, SW49T

Species of bacterium

Aequorivita antarctica is a bacterium from the genus of Aequorivita which occurs in coastal antarctic sea-ice and antarctic seawater.
