= Alishewanella =

Scientific classification
- Domain: Bacteria
- Kingdom: Pseudomonadati
- Phylum: Pseudomonadota
- Class: Gammaproteobacteria
- Order: Alteromonadales
- Family: Alteromonadaceae
- Genus: Alishewanella; Fonnesbech Vogel et al. 2000 emend. Kim et al. 2009.

Type species
- A. fetalis

Genus of bacteria

Alishewanella is a genus in the phylum Pseudomonadota (bacteria).

== Etymology ==
The name Alishewanella derives from:
Latin adjective and pronoun alius, other, another, different; Neo-Latin feminine gender noun Shewanella, a bacterial genus name; Neo-Latin feminine gender noun Alishewanella, the other Shewanella.

== Species ==
The genus contains seven species, namely:

- A. aestuarii (Roh et al. 2009, Latin genitive case noun aestuarii, of a tidal flat)
- A. agri (Kim et al. 2010, Latin genitive case noun agri, of a field)
- A. alkalitolerans (Sisinthy et al. 2018)
- A. fetalis (Fonnesbech Vogel et al, 2000, type species of the genus, Latin noun fetus young, offspring, Latin feminine gender suff. -alis, suffix denoting pertaining to, Neo-Latin feminine gender adjective fetalis, pertaining to the fetus, from which the organism was isolated)
- A. jeotgali (Kim et al, 2009, Neo-Latin genitive case noun jeotgali, of jeotgal, a traditional Korean fermented seafood)
- A. solinquinati (Kolekar et al. 2014)
- A. tabrizica (Tarhriz et al. 2012)

== See also ==
- Bacterial taxonomy
- Microbiology
