= Salimicrobium album =

Scientific classification
- Domain: Bacteria
- Kingdom: Bacillati
- Phylum: Bacillota
- Class: Bacilli
- Order: Bacillales
- Family: Halobacillaceae
- Genus: Salimicrobium
- Species: S. album

Binomial name
- Salimicrobium album (Hao et al. 1985) Yoon et al. 2007

Type strain
- A. Ventosa 11, ATCC 49811, CCM 3517, CIP 104820, DSM 20748, Hao HK 733, HK 733, IAM 12845, JCM 2574, LMG 17430, M.V. Hao HK73, NBRC 102360, VKM Ac-1949

Synonyms
- Marinococcus albus

Species of bacterium

Salimicrobium album is a bacterium from the genus of Salimicrobium which has been isolated from a saltern from Alicante in Spain.
