= Gramella forsetii =

Scientific classification
- Domain: Bacteria
- Kingdom: Pseudomonadati
- Phylum: Bacteroidota
- Class: Flavobacteriia
- Order: Flavobacteriales
- Family: Flavobacteriaceae
- Genus: Gramella
- Species: G. forsetii

Binomial name
- Gramella forsetii Panschin et al. 2017

Type strain
- KT0803

Bacterium

Gramella forsetii is a Gram-negative, strictly aerobic, chemoorganotrophic and heterotrophic bacterium from the genus of Gramella which has been isolated from water from roads from Helgoland near the North Sea.
