= Aequorivita nionensis =

Scientific classification
- Domain: Bacteria
- Kingdom: Pseudomonadati
- Phylum: Bacteroidota
- Class: Flavobacteriia
- Order: Flavobacteriales
- Family: Flavobacteriaceae
- Genus: Aequorivita
- Species: A. nionensis

Binomial name
- Aequorivita nionensis (Rajasabapathy et al. 2015) Hahnke et al. 2017

Type strain
- KCTC 32420, MCC 2354, VBW088

Synonyms
- Vitellibacter nionensis

Species of bacterium

Aequorivita nionensis is a Gram-negative, rod-shaped and non-motile bacterium from the genus of Aequorivita which has been isolated from water from a hydrothermal vent from Espalamaca in the Azores.
