= Gramella gaetbulicola =

Scientific classification
- Domain: Bacteria
- Kingdom: Pseudomonadati
- Phylum: Bacteroidota
- Class: Flavobacteriia
- Order: Flavobacteriales
- Family: Flavobacteriaceae
- Genus: Gramella
- Species: G. gaetbulicola

Binomial name
- Gramella gaetbulicola Cho et al. 2011

Type strain
- RA5-111

Bacterium

Gramella gaetbulicola is a Gram-negative, aerobic and rod-shaped bacterium from the genus of Gramella which has been isolated from foreshore soil.
