= Salimicrobium luteum =

Scientific classification
- Domain: Bacteria
- Kingdom: Bacillati
- Phylum: Bacillota
- Class: Bacilli
- Order: Bacillales
- Family: Halobacillaceae
- Genus: Salimicrobium
- Species: S. luteum

Binomial name
- Salimicrobium luteum Yoon et al. 2007

Type strain
- CIP 108918, KCTC 3989, BY-5

Synonyms
- Yeomjeonicoccus luteus

Species of bacterium

Salimicrobium luteum is a bacterium from the genus of Salimicrobium.
