= Gramella bathymodioli =

Scientific classification
- Domain: Bacteria
- Kingdom: Pseudomonadati
- Phylum: Bacteroidota
- Class: Flavobacteriia
- Order: Flavobacteriales
- Family: Flavobacteriaceae
- Genus: Gramella
- Species: G. bathymodioli

Binomial name
- Gramella bathymodioli Liu et al. 2020

Type strain
- BOM4

Bacterium

Gramella bathymodioli is a Gram-negative, rod-shaped, strictly aerobic and motile bacterium from the genus of Gramella which has been isolated from a mussel from the Tangyin hydrothermal field.
