= Aequorivita viscosa =

Scientific classification
- Domain: Bacteria
- Kingdom: Pseudomonadati
- Phylum: Bacteroidota
- Class: Flavobacteriia
- Order: Flavobacteriales
- Family: Flavobacteriaceae
- Genus: Aequorivita
- Species: A. viscosa

Binomial name
- Aequorivita viscosa Liu et al. 2013

Type strain
- CGMCC 1.11023, DSM 26349, JCM 18497, 8-1b

Species of bacterium

Aequorivita viscosa is a Gram-negative, short rod-shaped, aerobic and non-spore-forming bacterium from the genus of Aequorivita which has been isolated from seaweed from the intertidal zone from the East China Sea near Zhoushan in China.
