= Microbulbifer =

Scientific classification
- Domain: Bacteria
- Kingdom: Pseudomonadati
- Phylum: Pseudomonadota
- Class: Gammaproteobacteria
- Order: Alteromonadales
- Family: Alteromonadaceae
- Genus: Microbulbifer; González et al. 1997

Type species
- Microbulbifer hydrolyticus

Species
- M. aestuariivivens M. agarilyticus M. celer M. chitinlyticus M. elongatus M. echini M. elongatus M. epialgicus M. gwangyangensis M. halophilus M. hydrolyticus M. mangrovi M. marinus M. maritimus M. okinawensis M. pacificus M. rhizosphaerae M. salipaludis M. taiwanensis M. thermotolerans M. varibilis M. yueqingensis

Genus of bacteria

Microbulbifer is a genus of bacteria found in high-salt environments. Members of this genus can degrade complex carbohydrates such as cellulose, alginate, and chitin. Recently, Microbulbifer degredans was renamed Saccharophagus degredans.

== Etymology ==
Microbulbifer (Mi.cro. bul’bi.fer. Gr. adj. micro, small; L. m. n. bulbus, onion, bulb; L. suff. -fer, carrying, bearing; L. m. n. Microbulbifer, small bearer of bulbs).
