= Pseudobowmanella =

Scientific classification
- Domain: Bacteria
- Kingdom: Pseudomonadati
- Phylum: Pseudomonadota
- Class: Gammaproteobacteria
- Order: Alteromonadales
- Family: Alteromonadaceae
- Genus: Pseudobowmanella; Du et al. 2017

Type species
- Pseudobowmanella zhangzhouensis

Species
- P. zhangzhouensis

Genus of bacteria

Pseudobowmanella is a Gram-negative, facultatively anaerobic, rod-shaped and motile bacteria genus from the family of Alteromonadaceae with one known species (Planctobacterium marinum). Pseudobowmanella zhangzhouensis has been isolated from water from the Jiulong River in China.
