= Gramella flava =

Scientific classification
- Domain: Bacteria
- Kingdom: Pseudomonadati
- Phylum: Bacteroidota
- Class: Flavobacteriia
- Order: Flavobacteriales
- Family: Flavobacteriaceae
- Genus: Gramella
- Species: G. flava

Binomial name
- Gramella flava Liu et al. 2014

Type strain
- JLT2011

Bacterium

Gramella flava is a Gram-negative, aerobic and motile bacterium from the genus of Gramella which has been isolated from seawater.
