= Lacimicrobium =

Scientific classification
- Domain: Bacteria
- Kingdom: Pseudomonadati
- Phylum: Pseudomonadota
- Class: Gammaproteobacteria
- Order: Alteromonadales
- Family: Alteromonadaceae
- Genus: Lacimicrobium; Zhong et al. 2016

Type species
- Lacimicrobium alkaliphilum

Species
- L. alkaliphilum

Genus of bacteria

Lacimicrobium is a Gram-negative, facultatively aerobic and motile bacteria genus from the family of Alteromonadaceae with one known species (Lacimicrobium alkaliphilum). Lacimicrobium alkaliphilum has been isolated from the Lake Xiaochaidan in the Qaidam Basin in China.
