= Gramella echinicola =

Scientific classification
- Domain: Bacteria
- Kingdom: Pseudomonadati
- Phylum: Bacteroidota
- Class: Flavobacteriia
- Order: Flavobacteriales
- Family: Flavobacteriaceae
- Genus: Gramella
- Species: G. echinicola

Binomial name
- Gramella echinicola Nedashkovskaya et al. 2005

Type strain
- KMM 6050

Bacterium

Gramella echinicola is a Gram-negative and halophilic bacterium from the genus of Gramella which has been isolated from the sea urchin Strongylocentrotus intermedius from the Sea of Japan.
