= Aequorivita todarodis =

Scientific classification
- Domain: Bacteria
- Kingdom: Pseudomonadati
- Phylum: Bacteroidota
- Class: Flavobacteriia
- Order: Flavobacteriales
- Family: Flavobacteriaceae
- Genus: Aequorivita
- Species: A. todarodis

Binomial name
- Aequorivita todarodis (Kim et al. 2018) Wang et al. 2020

Type strain
- MYP2-2

Synonyms
- Vitellibacter todarodis

Species of bacterium

Aequorivita todarodis is a Gram-negative, aerobic, rod-shaped and non-motile bacterium from the genus of Aequorivita which has been isolated from the intestinal tract of squid (Todarodes pacificus).
