= Gramella fulva =

Scientific classification
- Domain: Bacteria
- Kingdom: Pseudomonadati
- Phylum: Bacteroidota
- Class: Flavobacteriia
- Order: Flavobacteriales
- Family: Flavobacteriaceae
- Genus: Gramella
- Species: G. fulva

Binomial name
- Gramella fulva Hwang et al. 2020

Type strain
- SH35

Bacterium

Gramella fulva is a Gram-negative, aerobic and motile bacterium from the genus of Gramella. G. fulva was first isolated from a tidal flat.
