= Aequorivita lutea =

Scientific classification
- Domain: Bacteria
- Kingdom: Pseudomonadati
- Phylum: Bacteroidota
- Class: Flavobacteriia
- Order: Flavobacteriales
- Family: Flavobacteriaceae
- Genus: Aequorivita
- Species: A. lutea

Binomial name
- Aequorivita lutea Zhang et al. 2020

Species of bacterium

Aequorivita lutea is a Gram-negative, aerobic, rod-shaped and non-motile bacterium from the genus of Aequorivita which has been isolated from sediments of the Pearl River in China.
