= Gramella aestuarii =

Scientific classification
- Domain: Bacteria
- Kingdom: Pseudomonadati
- Phylum: Bacteroidota
- Class: Flavobacteriia
- Order: Flavobacteriales
- Family: Flavobacteriaceae
- Genus: Gramella
- Species: G. aestuarii

Binomial name
- Gramella aestuarii Jeong et al. 2013

Type strain
- BS12

Bacterium

Gramella aestuarii is a Gram-negative and strictly aerobic bacterium from the genus of Gramella which has been isolated from tidal flat from Boseong in Korea.
