= Bowmanella =

Scientific classification
- Domain: Bacteria
- Kingdom: Pseudomonadati
- Phylum: Pseudomonadota
- Class: Gammaproteobacteria
- Order: Alteromonadales
- Family: Alteromonadaceae
- Genus: Bowmanella; Jean et al. 2006

Type species
- Bowmanella denitrificans

Species
- Bowmanella denitrificans Bowmanella dokdonensis Bowmanella pacifica

Genus of bacteria

Bowmanella is a bacteria genus from the family Alteromonadaceae.
