= Aequorivita soesokkakensis =

Scientific classification
- Domain: Bacteria
- Kingdom: Pseudomonadati
- Phylum: Bacteroidota
- Class: Flavobacteriia
- Order: Flavobacteriales
- Family: Flavobacteriaceae
- Genus: Aequorivita
- Species: A. soesokkakensis

Binomial name
- Aequorivita soesokkakensis (Park et al. 2014) Hahnke et al. 2017

Type strain
- CECT 8398, KCTC 32536, RSSK-12

Synonyms
- Vitellibacter soesokkakensis

Species of bacterium

Aequorivita soesokkakensis is a Gram-negative, aerobic, non-spore-forming, rod-shaped and motile bacterium from the genus of Aequorivita.
