= Aequorivita lipolytica =

Scientific classification
- Domain: Bacteria
- Kingdom: Pseudomonadati
- Phylum: Bacteroidota
- Class: Flavobacteriia
- Order: Flavobacteriales
- Family: Flavobacteriaceae
- Genus: Aequorivita
- Species: A. lipolytica

Binomial name
- Aequorivita lipolytica Bowman and Nichols 2002

Type strain
- ACAM 641, CIP 107455, DSM 14236, LMG 21430, Y10-2

Species of bacterium

Aequorivita lipolytica is a bacterium from the genus of Aequorivita which occurs in sea water in the Antarctica.
