= Glaciecola =

Scientific classification
- Domain: Bacteria
- Kingdom: Pseudomonadati
- Phylum: Pseudomonadota
- Class: Gammaproteobacteria
- Order: Alteromonadales
- Family: Alteromonadaceae
- Genus: Glaciecola; Bowman et al. 1998

Type species
- Glaciecola punicea

Species
- G. nitratireducens G. pallidula G. punicea

Genus of bacteria

Glaciecola is an aerobic bacteria genus from the family of Alteromonadaceae.
