= Gramella salexigens =

Scientific classification
- Domain: Bacteria
- Kingdom: Pseudomonadati
- Phylum: Bacteroidota
- Class: Flavobacteriia
- Order: Flavobacteriales
- Family: Flavobacteriaceae
- Genus: Gramella
- Species: G. salexigens

Binomial name
- Gramella salexigens Shin et al. 2018

Type strain
- HJM-19

Bacterium

Gramella salexigens is a Gram-negative, aerobic and non-spore-forming bacterium from the genus of Gramella which has been isolated from water from Hwajinpo in Korea.
