= Aliagarivorans =

Scientific classification
- Missing taxonomy template (fix): Aliagarivorans

Type species
- Aliagarivorans marinus

Species
- Aliagarivorans marinus Aliagarivorans taiwanensis

Genus of bacteria

Aliagarivorans is a genus in the phylum Pseudomonadota (Bacteria).

== Etymology ==
The name Aliagarivorans derives from:
Latin adjective and pronoun alius, other, another, different; Neo-Latin noun Agarivorans, a name of a bacterial genus; Neo-Latin masculine gender noun Aliagarivorans, the other Agarivorans.

== Species ==
The genus contains 2 species.
