= Salimicrobium salexigens =

Scientific classification
- Domain: Bacteria
- Kingdom: Bacillati
- Phylum: Bacillota
- Class: Bacilli
- Order: Bacillales
- Family: Halobacillaceae
- Genus: Salimicrobium
- Species: S. salexigens

Binomial name
- Salimicrobium salexigens de la Haba et al. 2011

Type strain
- 29CMI, CECT 7568, JCM 16414, LMG 25386

Species of bacterium

Salimicrobium salexigens is a Gram-positive, moderately halophilic, strictly aerobic and non-motile bacterium from the genus of Salimicrobium which has been isolated from salted cowhide from Istanbul in Turkey.
