= Alteromonadaceae =

Scientific classification
- Domain: Bacteria
- Kingdom: Pseudomonadati
- Phylum: Pseudomonadota
- Class: Gammaproteobacteria
- Order: Alteromonadales
- Family: Alteromonadaceae

Genera
- Aestuariibacter; Agaribacter; Agarivorans; Alginatibacterium; Aliagarivorans; Aliiglaciecola; Alishewanella; Alkalimarinus; Alteromonas; Bowmanella; Catenovulum; Gayadomonas; Glaciecola; Lacimicrobium; Haliea; Marinimicrobium; Marinobacter; Marinobacterium; Melitea; Microbulbifer; Neptunicella; Paraglaciecola; Parahaliea; Planctobacterium; Pseudobowmanella; Salinimonas; Tamilnaduibacter

Family of bacteria

The Alteromonadaceae are a family of Pseudomonadota. They are now one of several families in the order Alteromonadales, including Alteromonas and its closest relatives. Species of this family are mostly rod-like shaped and motile by using one polar flagellum.
