= Thalassotalea montiporae =

Scientific classification
- Domain: Bacteria
- Kingdom: Pseudomonadati
- Phylum: Pseudomonadota
- Class: Gammaproteobacteria
- Order: Alteromonadales
- Family: Colwelliaceae
- Genus: Thalassotalea
- Species: T. montiporae

Binomial name
- Thalassotalea montiporae Chen et al. 2016

Type strain
- BCRC 17940, LMG 24827, CL-22

Species of bacterium

Thalassotalea montiporae is a Gram-negative, rod-shaped, aerobic and motile bacterium from the genus Thalassotalea with a single polar flagellum which has been isolated from the coral Montipora aequituberculata from the coast of Taiwan.
