= Colwellia piezophila =

Scientific classification
- Domain: Bacteria
- Kingdom: Pseudomonadati
- Phylum: Pseudomonadota
- Class: Gammaproteobacteria
- Order: Alteromonadales
- Family: Colwelliaceae
- Genus: Colwellia
- Species: C. piezophila

Binomial name
- Colwellia piezophila Nogi et al. 2004

Type strain
- ATCC BAA-637, JCM 11831, Y223G

Species of bacterium

Colwellia piezophila is an obligately piezophilic bacterium from the genus of Colwellia which has been isolated from sediments from the Japan Trench.
