= Colwellia maris =

Scientific classification
- Domain: Bacteria
- Kingdom: Pseudomonadati
- Phylum: Pseudomonadota
- Class: Gammaproteobacteria
- Order: Alteromonadales
- Family: Colwelliaceae
- Genus: Colwellia
- Species: C. maris

Binomial name
- Colwellia maris Yumoto et al. 1998

Type strain
- CIP 106458, JCM 10085, ABE-1

Species of bacterium

Colwellia maris is a psychrophilic and Gram-negative bacterium from the genus of Colwellia with a single polar flagellum which has been isolated from seawater from the Sea of Okhotsk in Japan.
