= Thalassomonas actiniarum =

Scientific classification
- Domain: Bacteria
- Kingdom: Pseudomonadati
- Phylum: Pseudomonadota
- Class: Gammaproteobacteria
- Order: Alteromonadales
- Family: Colwelliaceae
- Genus: Thalassomonas
- Species: T. actiniarum

Binomial name
- Thalassomonas actiniarum Hosoya et al. 2009

Type strain
- MBIC 08328, NBRC 104231, NCIMB 14418, A5K-106

Species of bacterium

Thalassomonas actiniarum is a heterotrophic bacterium from the genus Thalassomonas which has been isolated from marine animals.
