= Colwellia rossensis =

Scientific classification
- Domain: Bacteria
- Kingdom: Pseudomonadati
- Phylum: Pseudomonadota
- Class: Gammaproteobacteria
- Order: Alteromonadales
- Family: Colwelliaceae
- Genus: Colwellia
- Species: C. rossensis

Binomial name
- Colwellia rossensis Bowman et al. 1998

Species of bacterium

Colwellia rossensis is a psychrophilic Antarctic bacterial species with the ability to synthesize docosahexaenoic acid. It is non-pigmented, curved rod-like shaped, exhibiting facultative anaerobic growth and possessing an absolute requirement for sea water. Its type strain is ACAM 608^{T}.
