= Colwellia =

Scientific classification
- Domain: Bacteria
- Kingdom: Pseudomonadati
- Phylum: Pseudomonadota
- Class: Gammaproteobacteria
- Order: Alteromonadales
- Family: Colwelliaceae
- Genus: Colwellia; Deming et al. 1988

Type species
- Colwellia psychrerythraea

Species
- C. aestuarii C. agarivorans C. aquaemaris C. arctica C. asteriadis C. beringensis C. chukchiensis C. demingiae C. echini C. hadaliensis C. hornerae C. marinimaniae C. maris C. meonggei C. mytili C. piezophila C. polaris C. psychrerythraea C. psychrotropica C. rossensis C. sediminilitoris

Genus of bacteria

Colwellia is a genus of deep-sea psychrophilic, piezophilic, and facultative anaerobic bacteria from the family Colwelliaceae. Colwellia can survive at subzero temperatures by producing cryoprotective substances.
