= Thalassotalea euphylliae =

Scientific classification
- Domain: Bacteria
- Kingdom: Pseudomonadati
- Phylum: Pseudomonadota
- Class: Gammaproteobacteria
- Order: Alteromonadales
- Family: Colwelliaceae
- Genus: Thalassotalea
- Species: T. euphylliae

Binomial name
- Thalassotalea euphylliae Sheu et al. 2016

Type strain
- BCRC 80910, KCTC 42743, LMG 29001, Eup-16

Species of bacterium

Thalassotalea euphylliae is a Gram-negative, aerobic, rod-shaped and motile bacterium from the genus Thalassotalea with a single polar flagellum which has been isolated from the coral Euphyllia glabrescens.
