= Thalassomonas viridans =

Scientific classification
- Domain: Bacteria
- Kingdom: Pseudomonadati
- Phylum: Pseudomonadota
- Class: Gammaproteobacteria
- Order: Alteromonadales
- Family: Colwelliaceae
- Genus: Thalassomonas
- Species: T. viridans

Binomial name
- Thalassomonas viridans Macián et al. 2001

Type strain
- CECT 5083, DSM 13754, DSMZ 13754, XOM25

Species of bacterium

Thalassomonas viridans is a Gram-negative, aerobic and motile bacterium from the genus Thalassomonas which has been isolated from an oyster from the Mediterranean coast from Spain.
