= Thalassotalea piscium =

Scientific classification
- Domain: Bacteria
- Kingdom: Pseudomonadati
- Phylum: Pseudomonadota
- Class: Gammaproteobacteria
- Order: Alteromonadales
- Family: Colwelliaceae
- Genus: Thalassotalea
- Species: T. piscium

Binomial name
- Thalassotalea piscium Zhang et al. 2014

Type strain
- DSM 26287, JCM 18590, KCTC 32144, T202

Species of bacterium

Thalassotalea piscium is a Gram-negative, rod-shaped and aerobic bacterium from the genus Thalassotalea which has been isolated from a cultivated flounder.
