= Thalassomonas haliotis =

Scientific classification
- Domain: Bacteria
- Kingdom: Pseudomonadati
- Phylum: Pseudomonadota
- Class: Gammaproteobacteria
- Order: Alteromonadales
- Family: Colwelliaceae
- Genus: Thalassomonas
- Species: T. haliotis

Binomial name
- Thalassomonas haliotis Hosoya et al. 2009

Type strain
- MBIC 08329, NBRC 104232, NCIMB 14417, A5K-61

Species of bacterium

Thalassomonas haliotis is a heterotrophic bacterium from the genusThalassomonas which has been isolated from marine animals.
