= Colwellia demingiae =

Scientific classification
- Domain: Bacteria
- Kingdom: Pseudomonadati
- Phylum: Pseudomonadota
- Class: Gammaproteobacteria
- Order: Alteromonadales
- Family: Colwelliaceae
- Genus: Colwellia
- Species: C. demingiae

Binomial name
- Colwellia demingiae Bowman et al. 1998

Species of bacterium

Colwellia demingiae is a psychrophilic Antarctic bacterial species with the ability to synthesize docosahexaenoic acid. It is nonpigmented, curved-rod-like in shape, exhibiting facultative anaerobic growth, and possessing an absolute requirement for sea water. Its type strain is ACAM 459^{T}. This bacteria is named after Jody Deming, a professor and researcher at University of Washington and her research mentor, Rita Colwell.
