= Colwellia aquaemaris =

Scientific classification
- Domain: Bacteria
- Kingdom: Pseudomonadati
- Phylum: Pseudomonadota
- Class: Gammaproteobacteria
- Order: Alteromonadales
- Family: Colwelliaceae
- Genus: Colwellia
- Species: C. agarivorans

Binomial name
- Colwellia agarivorans Liu et al. 2014

Type strain
- CGMCC 1.12165, JCM 18479, strain S1

Species of bacterium

Colwellia aquaemaris is a Gram-negative, heterotrophic and facultatively anaerobic bacterium from the genus of Colwellia which has been isolated from the fish Cynoglossus semilaevis from a recirculating mariculture system in Tianjin in China.
