= Colwellia asteriadis =

Scientific classification
- Domain: Bacteria
- Kingdom: Pseudomonadati
- Phylum: Pseudomonadota
- Class: Gammaproteobacteria
- Order: Alteromonadales
- Family: Colwelliaceae
- Genus: Colwellia
- Species: C. asteriadis

Binomial name
- Colwellia asteriadis Choi et al. 2010

Type strain
- KMD002, JCM 15608, KCCM 90077

Synonyms
- Colwellia amurensis

Species of bacterium

Colwellia asteriadis is a Gram-negative and rod-shaped bacterium from the genus of Colwellia which has been isolated from the starfish Asterias amurensis from the Sea of Japan.
