= Thalassotalea insulae =

Scientific classification
- Domain: Bacteria
- Kingdom: Pseudomonadati
- Phylum: Pseudomonadota
- Class: Gammaproteobacteria
- Order: Alteromonadales
- Family: Colwelliaceae
- Genus: Thalassotalea
- Species: T. insulae

Binomial name
- Thalassotalea insulae Park et al. 2018

Type strain
- KACC 19433, KCTC 62186, NBRC 113040

Species of bacterium

Thalassotalea insulae is a Gram-negative, aerobic, rod-shaped and motile bacterium from the genus Thalassotalea which has been isolated from tidal flat sediments from Jindo in Korea.
