= Colwellia echini =

Scientific classification
- Domain: Bacteria
- Kingdom: Pseudomonadati
- Phylum: Pseudomonadota
- Class: Gammaproteobacteria
- Order: Alteromonadales
- Family: Colwelliaceae
- Genus: Colwellia
- Species: C. echini

Binomial name
- Colwellia echini Christiansen et al. 2018

Type strain
- LMG 30125

Synonyms
- Colwellia agarilytica

Species of bacterium

Colwellia echini is a gram-negative, rod-shaped, and facultatively anaerobic bacterium from the genus Colwellia which has been isolated from the sea urchin Strongylocentrotus droebachiensis from Øresund in Denmark.
