= Vase coral =

Vase coral may refer to several different taxa:

- species of the genus Turbinaria
- Montipora capricornis, a species of coral
