= Thalassotalea agariperforans =

Scientific classification
- Domain: Bacteria
- Kingdom: Pseudomonadati
- Phylum: Pseudomonadota
- Class: Gammaproteobacteria
- Order: Alteromonadales
- Family: Colwelliaceae
- Genus: Thalassotalea
- Species: T. agariperforans

Binomial name
- Thalassotalea agariperforans (Park et al. 2011) Zhang et al. 2014

Type strain
- CCUG 60020, KCTC 23343, M-M1

Synonyms
- Thalassomonas agariperforans

Species of bacterium

Thalassotalea agariperforans is a Gram-negative, agarolytic and motile bacterium from the genus Thalassotalea which has been isolated from the South Sea near the Geoje Island in Korea.
