= Thalassotalea sediminis =

Scientific classification
- Domain: Bacteria
- Kingdom: Pseudomonadati
- Phylum: Pseudomonadota
- Class: Gammaproteobacteria
- Order: Alteromonadales
- Family: Colwelliaceae
- Genus: Thalassotalea
- Species: T. sediminis

Binomial name
- Thalassotalea sediminis Xu et al. 2017

Type strain
- KCTC 42588, MCCC 1H00116

Species of bacterium

Thalassotalea sediminis is a Gram-negative, rod-shaped and facultatively anaerobic bacterium from the genus Thalassotalea which has been isolated from sediments from the coast of Weihai in China.
