= Thalassotalea atypica =

Scientific classification
- Domain: Bacteria
- Kingdom: Pseudomonadati
- Phylum: Pseudomonadota
- Class: Gammaproteobacteria
- Order: Alteromonadales
- Family: Colwelliaceae
- Genus: Thalassotalea
- Species: T. atypica

Binomial name
- Thalassotalea atypica Wang et al. 2018

Type strain
- JCM 31894, KCTC 52745, MCCC 1K03276

Species of bacterium

Thalassotalea atypica is a Gram-negative, strictly aerobic and non-spore-forming bacterium from the genus Thalassotalea which has been isolated from seawater from Rizhao in China.
