= Thalassotalea coralli =

Scientific classification
- Domain: Bacteria
- Kingdom: Pseudomonadati
- Phylum: Pseudomonadota
- Class: Gammaproteobacteria
- Order: Alteromonadales
- Family: Colwelliaceae
- Genus: Thalassotalea
- Species: T. coralli

Binomial name
- Thalassotalea coralli Sheu et al. 2018

Type strain
- BCCM/LMG:29478, BCRC 80967, KCTC 52169

Species of bacterium

Thalassotalea coralli is a Gram-negative, aerobic, rod-shaped and motile bacterium from the genus Thalassotalea which has been isolated from the coral Euphyllia glabrescens.
