= Colwellia psychrotropica =

Scientific classification
- Domain: Bacteria
- Kingdom: Pseudomonadati
- Phylum: Pseudomonadota
- Class: Gammaproteobacteria
- Order: Alteromonadales
- Family: Colwelliaceae
- Genus: Colwellia
- Species: C. psychrotropica

Binomial name
- Colwellia psychrotropica Bowman et al. 1998

Species of bacterium

Colwellia psychrotropica is a psychrophilic Antarctic bacterial species with the ability to synthesize docosahexaenoic acid. It is nonpigmented, curved-rod-like in shape, exhibiting facultative anaerobic growth and possessing an absolute requirement for sea water. Its type strain is ACAM 179^{T}.
