= Thalassotalea marina =

Scientific classification
- Domain: Bacteria
- Kingdom: Pseudomonadati
- Phylum: Pseudomonadota
- Class: Gammaproteobacteria
- Order: Alteromonadales
- Family: Colwelliaceae
- Genus: Thalassotalea
- Species: T. marina

Binomial name
- Thalassotalea marina Hou et al. 2015

Type strain
- CGMCC 1.12814, KCTC 42731, QBLM2

Species of bacterium

Thalassotalea marina is a Gram-negative and facultatively anaerobic bacterium from the genus Thalassotalea which has been isolated from a recirculating aquaculture system in Tianjin in China.
