= Colwellia aestuarii =

Scientific classification
- Domain: Bacteria
- Kingdom: Pseudomonadati
- Phylum: Pseudomonadota
- Class: Gammaproteobacteria
- Order: Alteromonadales
- Family: Colwelliaceae
- Genus: Colwellia
- Species: C. aestuarii

Binomial name
- Colwellia aestuarii Jung et al. 2006

Type strain
- DSM 17314, KCTC 12480, SMK-10

Species of bacterium

Colwellia aestuarii is a Gram-negative and motile bacterium from the genus of Colwellia which has been isolated from tidal flat sediments from Korea.
