= Thalassotalea ponticola =

Scientific classification
- Domain: Bacteria
- Kingdom: Pseudomonadati
- Phylum: Pseudomonadota
- Class: Gammaproteobacteria
- Order: Alteromonadales
- Family: Colwelliaceae
- Genus: Thalassotalea
- Species: T. ponticola

Binomial name
- Thalassotalea ponticola Park et al. 2014

Type strain
- CECT 8656, KCTC 42155, GJSW-36

Synonyms
- Thalassotalea pontivita

Species of bacterium

Thalassotalea ponticola is a Gram-negative and aerobic bacterium from the genus Thalassotalea which has been isolated from seawater from the Geoje Island in Korea.
