= Colwellia meonggei =

Scientific classification
- Domain: Bacteria
- Kingdom: Pseudomonadati
- Phylum: Pseudomonadota
- Class: Gammaproteobacteria
- Order: Alteromonadales
- Family: Colwelliaceae
- Genus: Colwellia
- Species: C. meonggei

Binomial name
- Colwellia meonggei Kim et al. 2014

Type strain
- ECT 8302, KCTC 32380, MA1-3

Species of bacterium

Colwellia meonggei is a Gram-negative, non-spore-forming aerobic and motile bacterium from the genus of Colwellia which has been isolated from the sea squirt Halocynthia roretzi from the South sea in Korea.
