= Colwellia arctica =

Scientific classification
- Domain: Bacteria
- Kingdom: Pseudomonadati
- Phylum: Pseudomonadota
- Class: Gammaproteobacteria
- Order: Alteromonadales
- Family: Colwelliaceae
- Genus: Colwellia
- Species: C. arctica

Binomial name
- Colwellia arctica Wang et al. 2015

Type strain
- ATCC BAA-2609, CICC 10860, strain 435

Species of bacterium

Colwellia arctica is a Gram-negative and facultatively anaerobic bacterium from the genus of Colwellia which has been isolated from marine sediment from the Arctic.
