= Thalassotalea crassostreae =

Scientific classification
- Domain: Bacteria
- Kingdom: Pseudomonadati
- Phylum: Pseudomonadota
- Class: Gammaproteobacteria
- Order: Alteromonadales
- Family: Colwelliaceae
- Genus: Thalassotalea
- Species: T. crassostreae

Binomial name
- Thalassotalea crassostreae Choi et al. 2017

Type strain
- JCM 31189, KACC 18695, LPB0076, LPB0090

Species of bacterium

Thalassotalea crassostreae is a Gram-negative, aerobic and rod-shaped bacterium from the genus Thalassotalea which has been isolated from the oyster Crassostrea gigas from the Yeongheung Island in South Korea.
