= Colwellia mytili =

Scientific classification
- Domain: Bacteria
- Kingdom: Pseudomonadati
- Phylum: Pseudomonadota
- Class: Gammaproteobacteria
- Order: Alteromonadales
- Family: Colwelliaceae
- Genus: Colwellia
- Species: C. mytili

Binomial name
- Colwellia mytili Kim et al. 2017

Type strain
- KCTC 52417, NBRC 112381, strain RA2-7

Species of bacterium

Colwellia mytili is a Gram-negative, rod-shaped, aerobic and motile bacterium from the genus of Colwellia which has been isolated from the mussel Mytilus edulis from the South Sea in Korea.
