= Thalassotalea ganghwensis =

Scientific classification
- Domain: Bacteria
- Kingdom: Pseudomonadati
- Phylum: Pseudomonadota
- Class: Gammaproteobacteria
- Order: Alteromonadales
- Family: Colwelliaceae
- Genus: Thalassotalea
- Species: T. ganghwensis

Binomial name
- Thalassotalea ganghwensis (Yi et al. 2004) Zhang et al. 2014

Type strain
- CIP 108416, DSM 15355, IMSNU 14005, JC2041, KCTC 1204

Synonyms
- Thalassomonas ganghwensis

Species of bacterium

Thalassotalea ganghwensis is a Gram-negative, aerobic and halophilic bacterium from the genus Thalassotalea which has been isolated from tidal flat sediments in Korea.
