= Thalassotalea loyana =

Scientific classification
- Domain: Bacteria
- Kingdom: Pseudomonadati
- Phylum: Pseudomonadota
- Class: Gammaproteobacteria
- Order: Alteromonadales
- Family: Colwelliaceae
- Genus: Thalassotalea
- Species: T. loyana

Binomial name
- Thalassotalea loyana (Thompson et al. 2006) Zhang et al. 2014

Type strain
- CBMAI 722, LMG 22536, MA3

Synonyms
- Thalassomonas loyana

Species of bacterium

Thalassotalea loyana is a bacterium from the genus Thalassotalea. Thalassotalea loyana can cause white plague disease in the coral species Favia favus.
