= Thalassotalea profundi =

Scientific classification
- Domain: Bacteria
- Kingdom: Pseudomonadati
- Phylum: Pseudomonadota
- Class: Gammaproteobacteria
- Order: Alteromonadales
- Family: Colwelliaceae
- Genus: Thalassotalea
- Species: T. profundi

Binomial name
- Thalassotalea profundi Liu et al. 2017

Type strain
- CGMCC 1.15922, KACC 18563

Species of bacterium

Thalassotalea profundi is a Gram-negative, rod-shaped, motile bacterium from the genus Thalassotalea. It has been isolated from a scleractinian coral from the Yap seamounts in the Pacific Ocean.
