= Thalassotalea litorea =

Scientific classification
- Domain: Bacteria
- Kingdom: Pseudomonadati
- Phylum: Pseudomonadota
- Class: Gammaproteobacteria
- Order: Alteromonadales
- Family: Colwelliaceae
- Genus: Thalassotalea
- Species: T. litorea

Binomial name
- Thalassotalea litorea Kang et al. 2017

Type strain
- KCTC 52154, 112672, HMF4135

Species of bacterium

Thalassotalea litorea is a bacterium from the genus Thalassotalea which has been isolated from seashore sand from the South Sea in Korea.
