= Colwellia beringensis =

Scientific classification
- Domain: Bacteria
- Kingdom: Pseudomonadati
- Phylum: Pseudomonadota
- Class: Gammaproteobacteria
- Order: Alteromonadales
- Family: Colwelliaceae
- Genus: Colwellia
- Species: C. beringensis

Binomial name
- Colwellia beringensis Zhang et al. 2017

Type strain
- KCTC 52554, MCCC 1A11668, strain NB097-1

Species of bacterium

Colwellia beringensis is a Gram-negative, psychrophilic, rod-shaped and motile bacterium from the genus of Colwellia which has been isolated from sediments from the Bering Sea.
