= Colwellia agarivorans =

Scientific classification
- Domain: Bacteria
- Kingdom: Pseudomonadati
- Phylum: Pseudomonadota
- Class: Gammaproteobacteria
- Order: Alteromonadales
- Family: Colwelliaceae
- Genus: Colwellia
- Species: C. agarivorans

Binomial name
- Colwellia agarivorans Xu et al. 2017

Type strain
- KCTC 52273, MCCC 1H00143, strain QM50

Synonyms
- Colwellia agarovoran

Species of bacterium

Colwellia agarivorans is a Gram-negative and facultatively anaerobic bacterium from the genus of Colwellia which has been isolated from coastal seawater from Qingdao in China.
