= Colwellia chukchiensis =

Scientific classification
- Domain: Bacteria
- Kingdom: Pseudomonadati
- Phylum: Pseudomonadota
- Class: Gammaproteobacteria
- Order: Alteromonadales
- Family: Colwelliaceae
- Genus: Colwellia
- Species: C. chukchiensis

Binomial name
- Colwellia chukchiensis Yu et al. 2011

Type strain
- BCw111, CGMCC 1.9127, DSM 22576, LMG 25329, Yu BCw111

Species of bacterium

Colwellia chukchiensis is a Gram-negative, facultatively anaerobic, psychrotolerant and motile bacterium from the genus of Colwellia which has been isolated from sea water from the Chukchi Sea.
