= Thalassotalea agarivorans =

Scientific classification
- Domain: Bacteria
- Kingdom: Pseudomonadati
- Phylum: Pseudomonadota
- Class: Gammaproteobacteria
- Order: Alteromonadales
- Family: Colwelliaceae
- Genus: Thalassotalea
- Species: T. agarivorans

Binomial name
- Thalassotalea agarivorans (Jean et al. 2006) Zhang et al. 2014

Type strain
- BCRC 17492, CCRC 17492, DSM 19706, JCM 13379, TMA1

Synonyms
- Thalassomonas agarivorans

Species of bacterium

Thalassotalea agarivorans is an agarolytic bacterium from the genus Thalassotalea which has been isolated from coastel water from An-Ping Harbour on Taiwan.
