= Thalassotalea eurytherma =

Scientific classification
- Domain: Bacteria
- Kingdom: Pseudomonadati
- Phylum: Pseudomonadota
- Class: Gammaproteobacteria
- Order: Alteromonadales
- Family: Colwelliaceae
- Genus: Thalassotalea
- Species: T. eurytherma

Binomial name
- Thalassotalea eurytherma (Sun et al. 2014) Hou et al. 2015

Type strain
- CGMCC 1.12115, JCM 18482, Za6a-12, Za6a-17

Synonyms
- Thalassomonas eurytherma

Species of bacterium

Thalassotalea eurytherma is a Gram-negative, aerobic and rod-shaped bacterium from the genus Thalassotalea which has been isolated from seawater from the East China Sea.
