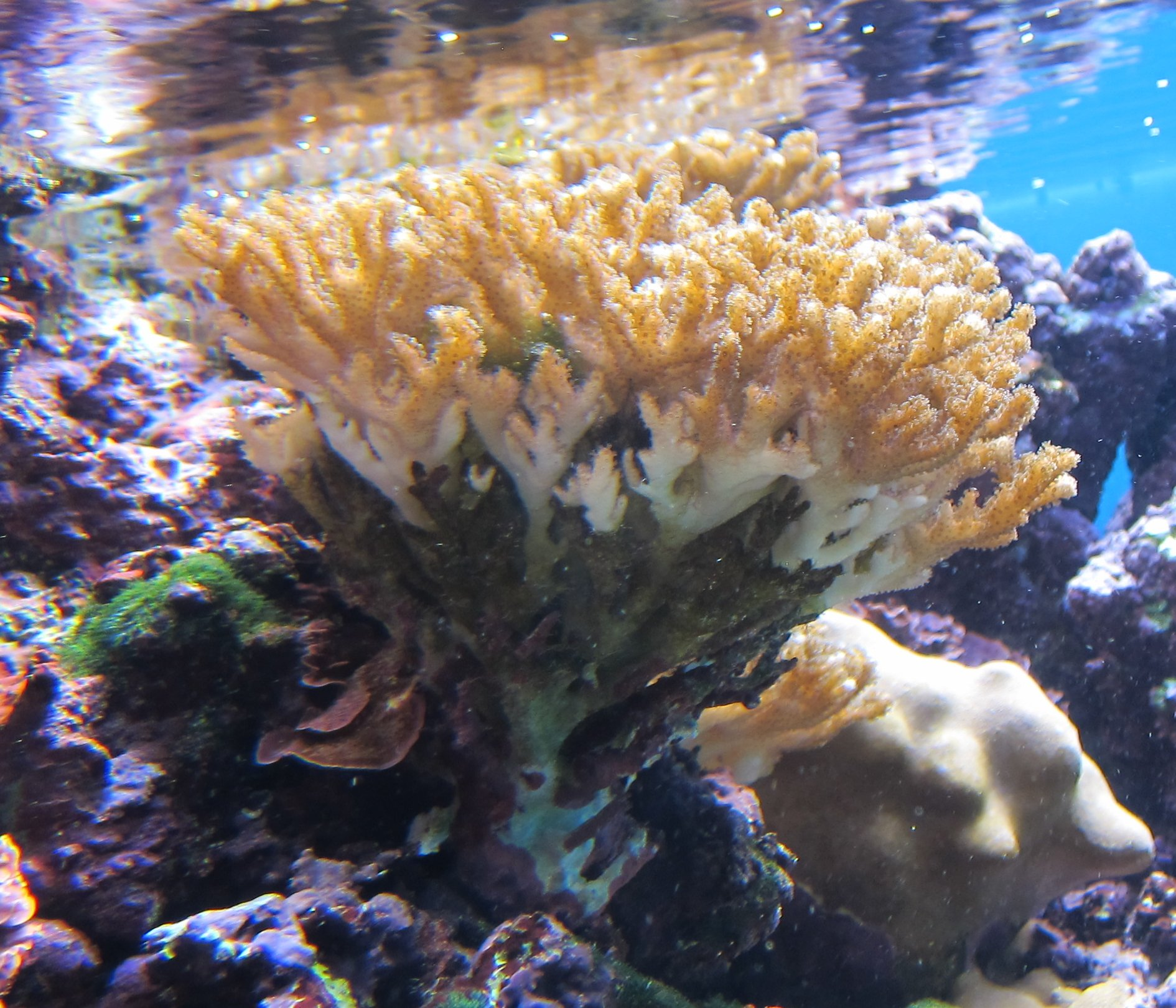

Conservation status
- Vulnerable (IUCN 3.1)

Scientific classification
- Kingdom: Animalia
- Phylum: Cnidaria
- Subphylum: Anthozoa
- Class: Hexacorallia
- Order: Scleractinia
- Family: Acroporidae
- Genus: Montipora
- Species: M. dilatata

Binomial name
- Montipora dilatata Studer, 1901

= Montipora dilatata =

Species of coral

Montipora dilatata, commonly known as the Hawaiian reef coral, is a species of coral in the family Acroporidae.

== Description ==
Morphology of this species can be quite variable. Colonies may be any combination of encrustations, plates, knobs, and branches. Montipora dilatata is a glabro-favoleate type that is characterized by a very smooth surface. Colonies are usually purple or brown and reach 3 feet (1 m) in diameter. The species only occurs in the Hawaiian archipelago, in Kaneohe Bay, Oahu, and in the Northwestern Hawaiian Islands (NWHI) at Midway Atoll, Pearl and Hermes Atoll, Lisianski Island, Laysan Island, Maro Reef, and French Frigate Shoals.

== Ecology ==
This species requires calm water in sub-tidal environments. The species is easily broken into fragments by storms or bioerosion, with the fragments readily growing into new colonies. This species occurs in lagoons and bays and appears to be restricted to shallow, low-water motion environments. This species is very rare in Kaneohe Bay, but used to be more abundant and occurred in large patches on some of the reef flats.

== Threats and conservation ==
It has declined significantly over time and only 3 colonies were found in a 2000 survey. The main threats to M. dilatata include: 1) vulnerability to coral bleaching due to high temperatures (it was the first species to bleach during the 1996 event in Kaneohe Bay); 2) fresh water kills and exposure at extreme low tide; 3) habitat degradation and modification as a result of sedimentation, pollution, alien alga species (Gracilaria salicornia, Kappaphycus and Eucheuma spp. algae) and invasive green alga (Dictyosphaeria cavernosa) in Kaneohe Bay; 4) a limited distribution; and 5) damage by anchors, fish pots, swimmers and divers.

Two other species, M. turgescens at Kure Atoll and M. cf. dilatata (recorded at one site out of 30 sites surveyed at Maro Reef in 2000-2002) are similar, and genetic analysis should be done to confirm their separation into distinct species.

The Hawaiian reef coral is a U.S. National Marine Fisheries Service Species of Concern. Species of Concern are those species about which the U.S. Government’s National Oceanic and Atmospheric Administration, National Marine Fisheries Service has some concerns regarding status and threats, but for which insufficient information is available to indicate a need to list the species under the U.S. Endangered Species Act (ESA).

Coral collection is not allowed in the state waters of Hawaii without a research permit.
