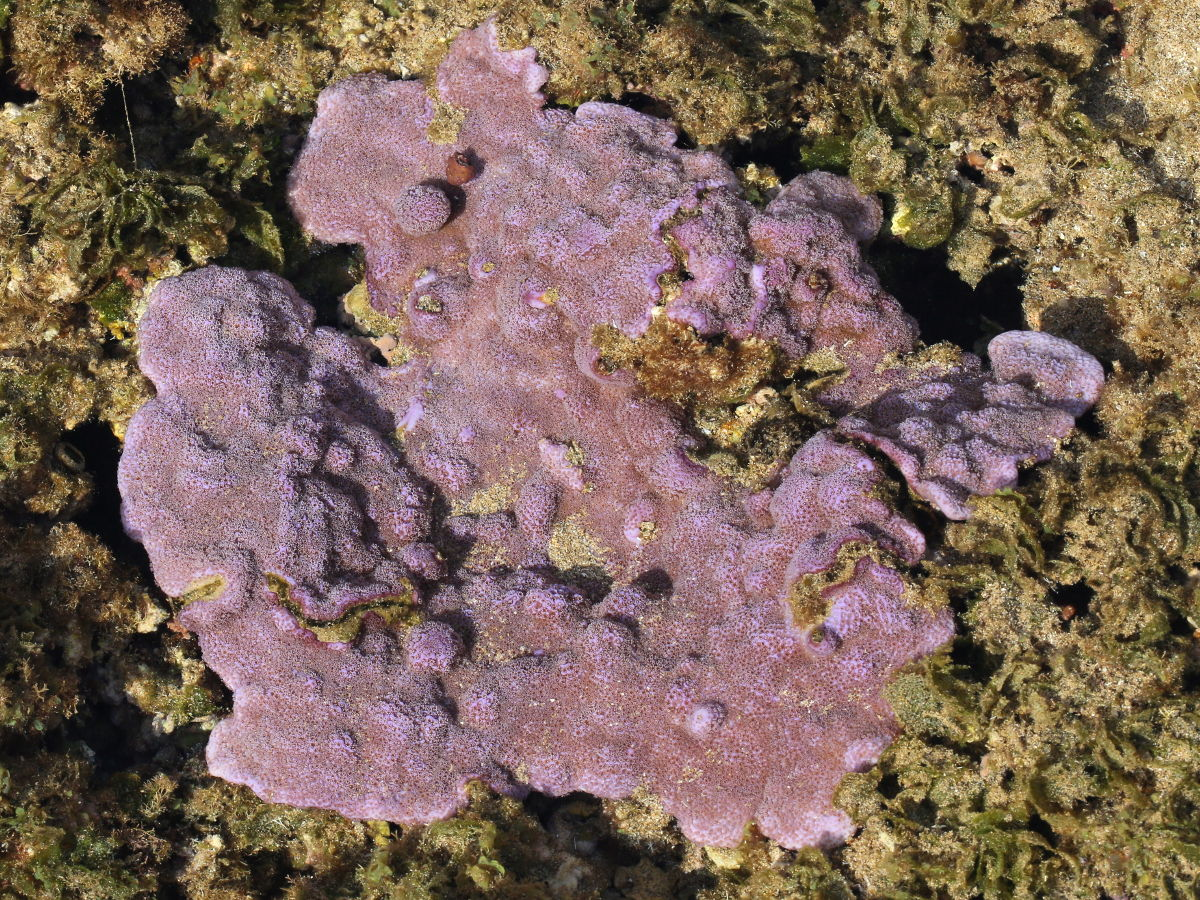

Conservation status
- Near Threatened (IUCN 3.1)

Scientific classification
- Kingdom: Animalia
- Phylum: Cnidaria
- Subphylum: Anthozoa
- Class: Hexacorallia
- Order: Scleractinia
- Family: Acroporidae
- Genus: Montipora
- Species: M. flabellata

Binomial name
- Montipora flabellata Studer, 1901

= Montipora flabellata =

Species of coral

Montipora flabellata, known by the common name blue rice coral, is a species of coral in the family Acroporidae. It is found growing on coral reefs in tropical parts of the Indian and Pacific Oceans. It is known to be endemic to the Hawaiian Islands. Its Hawaiian name translated to Polū laiki ko'a, polū meaning blue, laiki meaning rice, and ko'a meaning corals in ʻŌlelo Hawaii.

== Morphology and anatomy ==
Usually blue (which may photograph pink), also brown or purple. Colonies are encrusting, with irregular lobes. The reproductive traits of Montipora fabellata (Studer 1901) show a narrow distribution and are typically restricted to shallow water with high wave energy and irradiance with an encrusting growth form.

Colonies are encrusting, with irregular lobes. Corallites are small (0.5 mm diameter). Papillae cover the colony surface and are sometimes fused into ridges. Septa are poorly developed. Encrusting lilac, pink, blue, or rarely brown sheets with calices immersed between irregular ridges of fused rods. Fluorescent blue color is only present in photographs taken with sunlight.

== Distribution and habitat ==
Found in Hawaiʻi and the Central Pacific. The species is endemic to Hawaiʻi and currently under review for listing as threatened or endangered species under the US Endangered Species Act. There are recordings of highest predicted cover for M. flabellata along the east coasts of Kauai and Oʻahu and wave sheltered areas of Maui Nui. It is also relatively abundant statewide but typically has a very restricted niche, one of high wave energy, water flow, and high UVR exposure. Common in shallow water exposed to surge. The species likes shores with high wave action, such as winter 'big wave' surf in habitat characteristic of M. flabellata., making it an ideal location to inhabit. This hard coral is common in shallow water exposed to surge, in the highest wave energy environments. M. flabellata is less common and more restricted to shallow reef habitat, colonies of the species were found between 1 and 4 m (0 and 10 ft) depth.

The species is a broadcasting, simultaneous hermaphrodites that release egg-sperm bundles. Most coral where spawning was linked to the new moon, M. flabellata does not appear to follow a similarly correlated lunar phase environmental cue. Both light and heavy M. flabellata spawns were spread throughout most of the summer in years monitored and without a clearly delineated lunar phase. There is no clearly defined beginning or end of gametogenesis in M. flabellata. Temperature was the best seasonal predictor of spawning in M. flabellata.

Gamete development among and within colonies was characterized by even greater variability across an even broader gametogenic cycle. Montipora flabellata had a diverse size and maturity range of oocytes yearlong with an increase in proportion of mature oocytes during the midsummer that gradually declined into the early fall months, but large mature oocytes were always present. Testes in M. flabellata matured in conjunction with oocytes and were also observed in varying stages throughout the year, but, unlike oocytes, there were no late-stage spermatocytes in the winter and spring. Montipora flabellata spawning was spread sporadically throughout much of the summer and did not seem to strongly correlate with a particular moon phase.
