= Colwellia marinimaniae =

Scientific classification
- Domain: Bacteria
- Kingdom: Pseudomonadati
- Phylum: Pseudomonadota
- Class: Gammaproteobacteria
- Order: Alteromonadales
- Family: Colwelliaceae
- Genus: Colwellia
- Species: C. marinimaniae

Binomial name
- Colwellia marinimaniae Kusube et al. 2017

Type strain
- ATCC TSD-5, MTCD1, JCM 30270

Synonyms
- Colwellia cameronii

Species of bacterium

Colwellia marinimaniae is a hyperpiezophilic bacterium from the genus Colwellia which has been isolated from deep regions of the Mariana Trench. It is, so far, the most piezophilic organism yet described, with an optimal growth pressure of 120 MPa (approximately 1,200 atmospheres). The species is catalase and oxidase positive.
