= Litorilituus =

Scientific classification
- Domain: Bacteria
- Kingdom: Pseudomonadati
- Phylum: Pseudomonadota
- Class: Gammaproteobacteria
- Order: Alteromonadales
- Family: Colwelliaceae
- Genus: Litorilituus; Wang et al. 2013

Species
- L. sediminis

Genus of bacteria

Litorilituus is a genus of bacteria from the family Colwelliaceae with one known species (Litorilituus sediminis). Litorilituus sediminis has been isolated from sediments from an amphioxus breeding zone in Qingdao in China.
