= Thalassotalea =

Scientific classification
- Domain: Bacteria
- Kingdom: Pseudomonadati
- Phylum: Pseudomonadota
- Class: Gammaproteobacteria
- Order: Alteromonadales
- Family: Colwelliaceae
- Genus: Thalassotalea; Zhang et al. 2014

Type species
- Thalassotalea ganghwensis (Yi et al. 2004) Zhang et al. 2014

Species
- Thalassotalea agariperforans Thalassotalea agarivorans Thalassotalea atypica Thalassotalea coralli Thalassotalea crassostreae Thalassotalea euphylliae Thalassotalea eurytherma Thalassotalea ganghwensis Thalassotalea insulae Thalassotalea litorea Thalassotalea loyana Thalassotalea marina Thalassotalea montiporae Thalassotalea piscium Thalassotalea ponticola Thalassotalea profundi Thalassotalea sediminis

Genus of bacteria

Thalassotalea is an aerobic and chemo-organo-heterotrophic genus of bacteria from the family Colwelliaceae which occur in the ocean and in sea ice.
