= Montipora verrucosa =

Conservation status
- Vulnerable (IUCN 3.1)

Scientific classification
- Kingdom: Animalia
- Phylum: Cnidaria
- Subphylum: Anthozoa
- Class: Hexacorallia
- Order: Scleractinia
- Family: Acroporidae
- Genus: Montipora
- Species: M. verrucosa

Binomial name
- Montipora verrucosa (Lamarck, 1816)

Synonyms
- Montipora capitata

Species of coral

Montipora verrucosa is a stony coral Cnidarian found in the Pacific and Indian Oceans.

== Background ==
Montipora verrucosa is present in the shallow end of reefs and in lagoons of the Indian Ocean and Pacific Ocean. Colonies of M. verrucosa "are encrusting, submassive, form columns, or are laminar", and the surface of the coral have corallites between uniformly spaced verrucae. Colonies of M. verrucosa exhibit blue or brown coloring with many containing beige or white tips. Additionally, green and blue polyps extend from M. verrucosa colonies in the daylight. Deep reefs M. verrucosa colonies exhibit plating growth while shallow reefs colonies of M. verrucosa exhibit branching patterns. While normally colonies exhibit one growth pattern, some colonies exhibit both.

== Life cycle ==
Mature M. verrucosa release sperm and egg bundles that float in the water column. These bundles eventually burst, and fertilized eggs develop into planktonic larvae that float around in the water column. These planktonic follow chemical cues to find suitable substrate to attach to. Once attached to substate deemed suitable, the planktonic larva metamorphosis into adult benthic polyp. However, if their environment becomes unfavorable, adult polyps can retract their "polyp to the center of the primary skeleton and reverted back into a planktonic phase". If conditions became favorable again before the adult polyp detached, "the polyp flattened out over the original skeleton and tentacles reappeared". For adult polyps that fully transformed back to a their planktonic larvae phase, they resettled and metamorphosised into their adult benthic polyp when their environment become favorable.

== Symbiotic relationship ==
Montipora verrucosa have an obligate mutualistic relationship with an endosymbiont algae. The algae fix carbon inside of the coral's cells, and they convert the carbon into nutrients that support the growth and survival of the host coral. In a healthy coral, the endosymbiotic algae was responsible for 100% of its metabolic needs.

The endosymbiont algae found within M. verrucosa colonies is an dinoflagellate Symbiodinium in clade C that is dominant in Indo-Pacific corals. However, warming temperatures are creating heat stress which is resulting in corals expelling their Symbiodinium. This is a phenomenon called coral bleaching where corals are turning white because the Symbiodinium, which is responsible with providing corals with their color and nutrience, are being expelled. The Symbiodinium are able to survive as free-swimming algae. However, M. verrucosa struggle without their endosymbiont as they are forced to rely on energy stores. This ultimately can cause mortality as some corals do not have large enough reserves to support long term metabolic needs. Corals support a large amount of marine biodiversity by providing habitats, so mortality from bleaching can cause widespread disruption in marine ecosystems. However, coral bleaching is species dependent with some species surviving without their endosymbiont better than others.

A study examined the impact of coral bleaching on the Hawaiian species of M. verrucosa, also known as M. capitata, and their ability to withstand bleaching. This study found that “Chl a levels were significantly lower in bleached colonies” compared to unbleached. However, M. verrucosa did not display a change in lipid concentrations. Scientists theorized that because the P/R, photosynthesis to respiration, ratio was higher then P. compressa, another Hawaiian coral species that exhibited decrease in lipid concentration when bleached, M. verrucosa’s low respiration rate allowed this coral species to conserve energy increasing their ability to resist bleaching. Scientist also believe that M. verrucosa may have the ability to “re-allocate lipid resources from the non-bleached to the bleached portions of the colony and/or have a lower metabolic rate, which allows for the conservation of lipids irrespective of bleaching condition”. Characteristics of M. verrucosa allow this species to be more resistant to bleaching events then other species.
