= Jody Deming =

American oceanographer

Jody W. Deming
- Born: July 2, 1952; Houston, Texas, U.S
- Education: Smith College, University of Maryland, College Park
- Occupations: Professor, University of Washington
- Known for: Colwellia demingiae

Jody W. Deming (born July 2, 1952) is an American oceanographer. She is a professor of Oceanography and a marine microbiologist at the University of Washington (UW). Her research interests include studies of cold adapted microbes in their relation to astrobiology, biotechnology, and bioremediation. She is known for her extensive field work, being involved in over 50 nautical research expeditions. Deming is also the cofounder of the UW Astrobiology Extremophile Laboratory.

== Education ==
Deming graduated cum laude from Smith College in Massachusetts in 1974 with a Bachelors in Biological Sciences specializing in Botany. She was also awarded a Smith College Piano Scholarship during her undergraduate career. In 1981, Deming received her PhD in Microbiology at the University of Maryland with Rita Colwell as her thesis advisor.

== Career ==
In 1970's, Deming developed microbial detection systems for unusual habitats for NASA.

Deming is a professor and researcher at the University of Washington. Deming joined the faculty in 1988 and has directed the Marine Bioremediation Program and the Future of Ice Initiative and works as a founding member of the UW Astrobiology dual PhD Program. Deming is the Editor-in-chief of the nonprofit, open access journal, Elementa Ocean Science of Anthropocene.

=== Research ===
Deming's research primarily involves the study of cold-adapted microbes gathered from Arctic sea ice samples. The bacterium Colwellia demingiae (type strain ACAM 459) is named after her. Cold-adapted microbial life has been a research topic of astrobiologists searching for life on Europa and Mars, due to similar cold climates. As such, Deming's research has been used as a reference for institutions such as NASA for what life may be like on Europa and Mars.

=== Presentations ===
- 2008 Earth's Low Temperature Life: An Analog for Mars and Europa? (March 31, 2008).
- 2016 Life in Ice: Informing the Search on Other Ocean World (May 17, 2016).

== Awards ==
- 1993 US Coast Guard Arctic Service Medal
- 2003 U.S. National Academy of Sciences
- 2018 National Academies Keck Futures Initiative (NAKFI) Challenge Award
- 2023 Fellow of the American Geophysical Union

== See also ==
- Colwellia demingiae
- Frost flower (sea ice)
