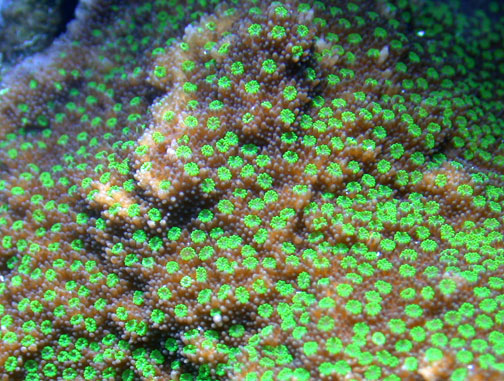

Conservation status
- Endangered (IUCN 3.1)

Scientific classification
- Kingdom: Animalia
- Phylum: Cnidaria
- Subphylum: Anthozoa
- Class: Hexacorallia
- Order: Scleractinia
- Family: Acroporidae
- Genus: Montipora
- Species: M. grisea

Binomial name
- Montipora grisea Bernard, 1897

= Montipora grisea =

Species of coral

Montipora grisea is a small polyped stony coral in the family Acroporidae.

== Description ==
It is an encrusting species considered to be massively sized, with "thick unifacial plates." It is usually dark brown or green in color, but also appears in shades of blue or pink. These corals have small bumps, known as thecal papillae, that are fused together around the corallite. They also have a coenosteum papillae that is present.

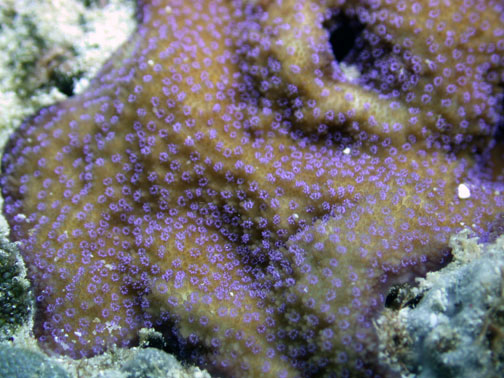
Pink

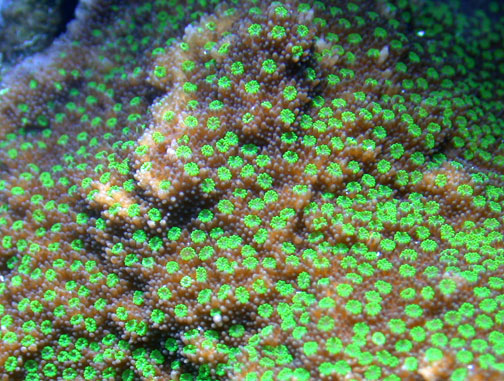
Green

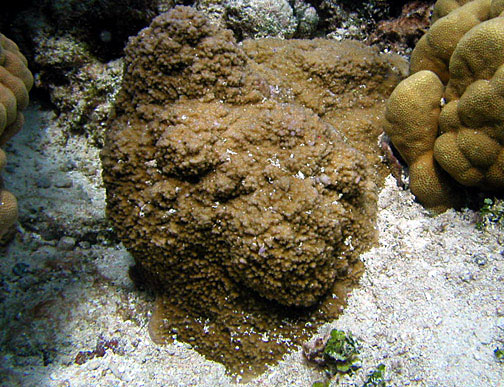
Brown

== Distribution & habitat ==
Montipora grisea has a vast range, found within the reefs of forty-five countries and territories throughout the Indian and Pacific oceans. It exists at depths of 3 to 20 metres (10 to 70 ft), with a preference for "shallow, tropical reef environments on upper reef slopes."

Despite being considered a common species with a presently large population, Montipora grisea faces an array of threats. It is moderately susceptible to bleaching, though notably less so than Acropora corals. Other threats include predation from the crown-of-thorns starfish, harvesting for the aquarium trade, climate change and ocean acidification.

== Reproduction and Development ==
These corals can be hermaphroditic or gonochoric. Their zygote produces planktonic planula larvae. Metamorphosis takes place early before larval settlement occurs on the opposite side of the mouth.
