= Montipora =

Scientific classification
- Kingdom: Animalia
- Phylum: Cnidaria
- Subphylum: Anthozoa
- Class: Hexacorallia
- Order: Scleractinia
- Family: Acroporidae
- Genus: Montipora; Blainville, 1830

Synonyms
- Manopora Dana, 1846

Genus of corals

Montipora is a genus of Scleractinian corals in the phylum Cnidaria. Members of the genus Montipora may exhibit many different growth morphologies. With eighty five known species, Montipora is the second most species rich coral genus after Acropora.

== Description ==
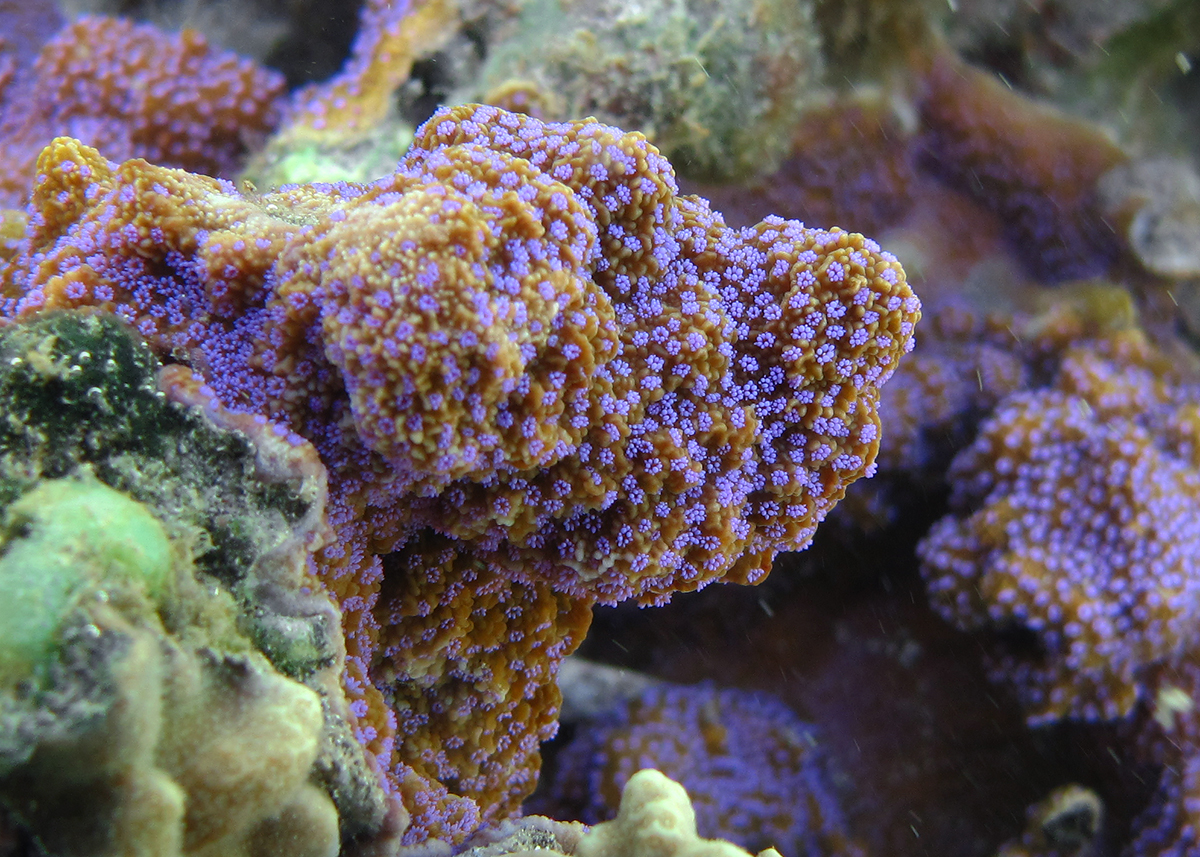
Montipora tuberculosa

Growth morphologies for the genus Montipora include submassive, laminar, foliaceous, encrusting, and branching. It is not uncommon for a single Montipora colony to display more than one growth morphology. Healthy Montipora corals can be a variety of colors, including orange, brown, pink, green, blue, purple, yellow, grey, or tan. Although they are typically uniform in color, some species, such as Montipora spumosa or Montipora verrucosa, may display a mottled appearance.

Montipora corals have the smallest corallites of any coral family. Columellae are not present. Coenosteum and corallite walls are porous, which can result in elaborate structures. The coenosteum of each Montipora species is different, making it useful for identification. Polyps are typically only extended at night.

Montipora corals are commonly mistaken for members of the genus Porites based on their visual similarities, however, Porites can be distinguished from Montipora by examining the structure of the corallites.

== Distribution ==
Montipora corals are common on reefs and lagoons of the Red Sea, the western Indian Ocean and the southern Pacific Ocean, but are entirely absent in the Atlantic Ocean.

== Ecology ==
Montipora corals are hermaphroditic broadcast spawners. Spawning typically happens in spring. The eggs of Montipora corals already contain zooxanthellae, so none is obtained from the environment. This process is known as direct or vertical transmission.

Montipora corals are preyed upon by corallivorous fish, such as butterflyfish. Montipora corals are known to host endo- and ectoparasites such as Allopodion mirum and Xarifia extensa. A currently undescribed species of nudibranch in the genus Phestilla has also been reported in the scientific and aquarium hobbyist literature to feed on the genus.

Montipora corals are susceptible to the same stresses as other Scleractinian corals, such as anthropogenic pollution, sediment, algal growth, and other competitive organisms.

== Evolutionary history ==
A 2007 study found that the genus Montipora formed a strongly supported clade with Anacropora, making it the genus with the closest genetic relationship to Montipora. It is thought that Anacropora evolved from Montipora relatively recently.

== Gallery ==
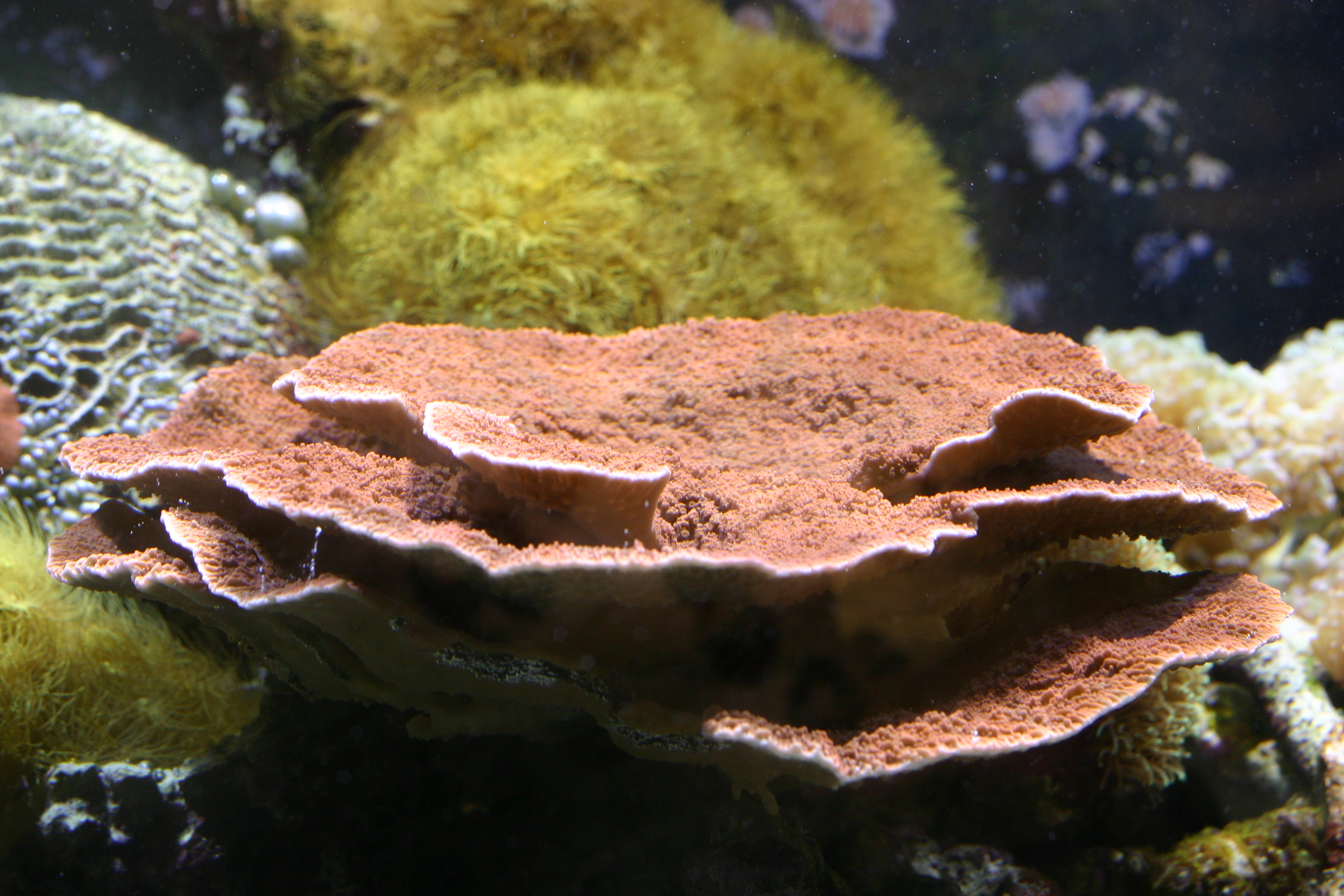
Montipora capricornis

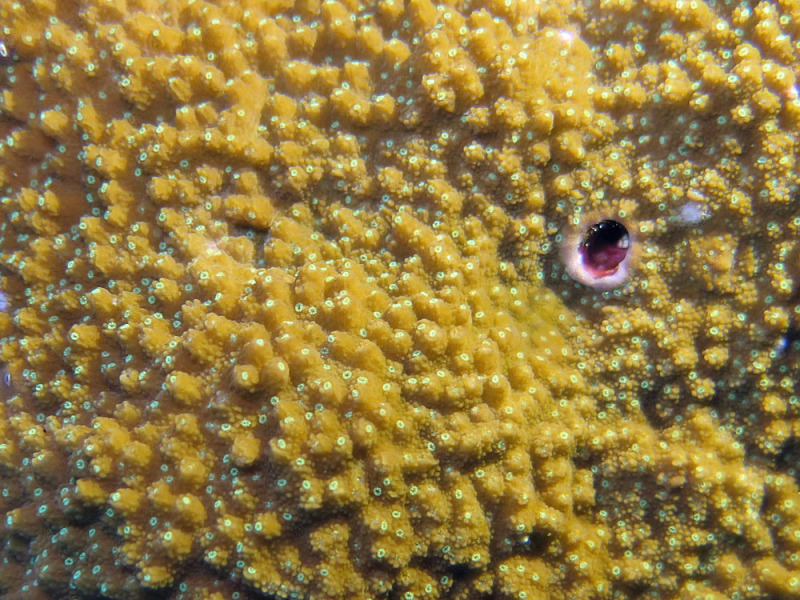
Polyps of Montipora aequituberculata

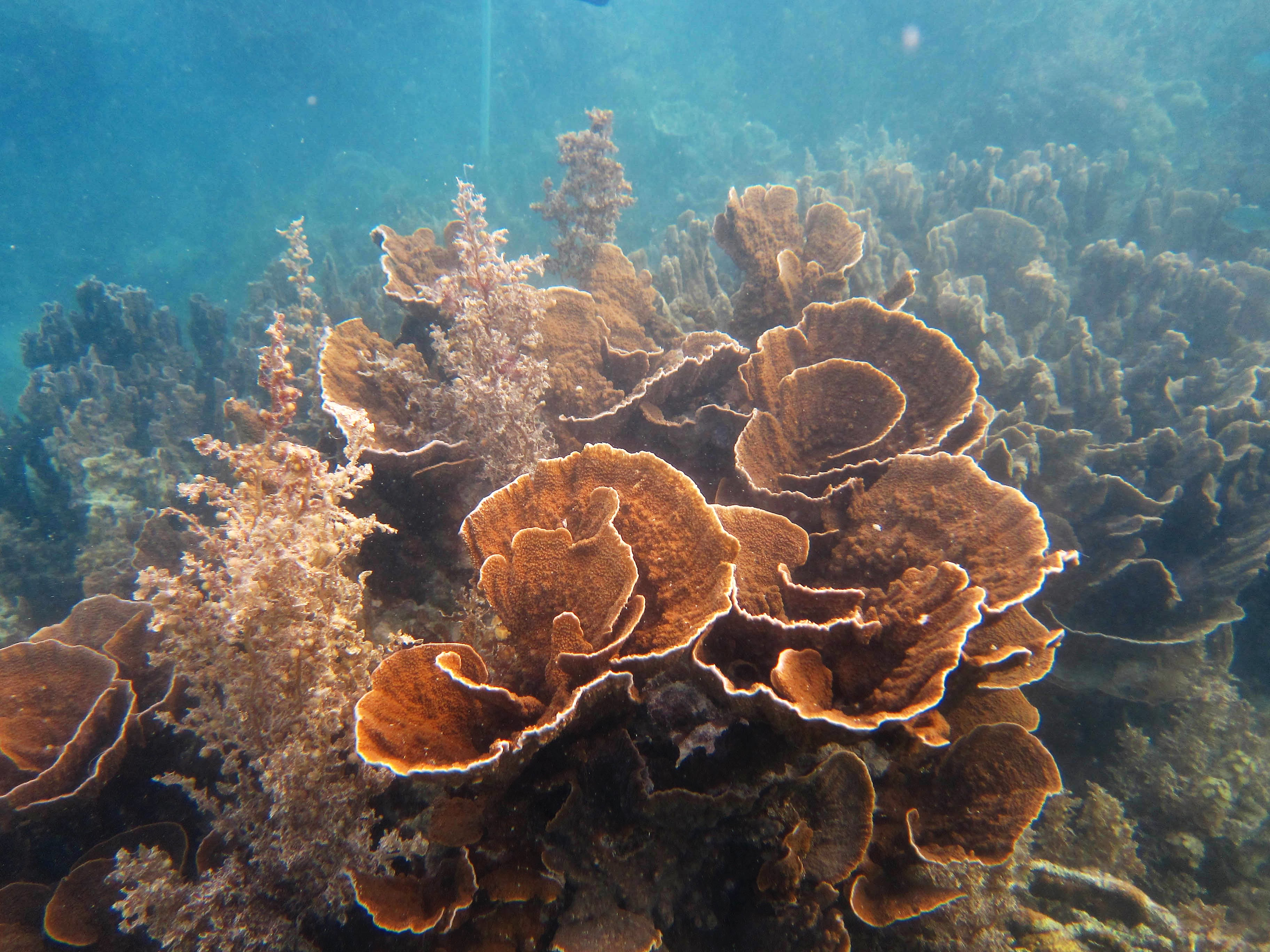
Montipora aequituberculata colonies near Ningaloo Reef

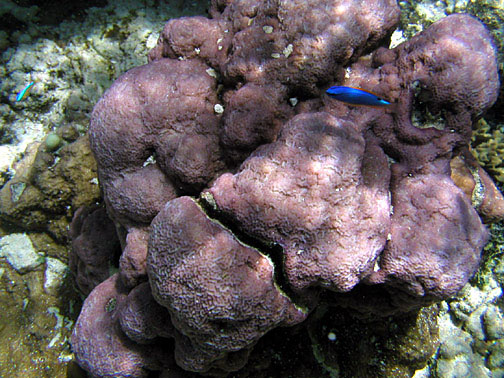
Montipora caliculata

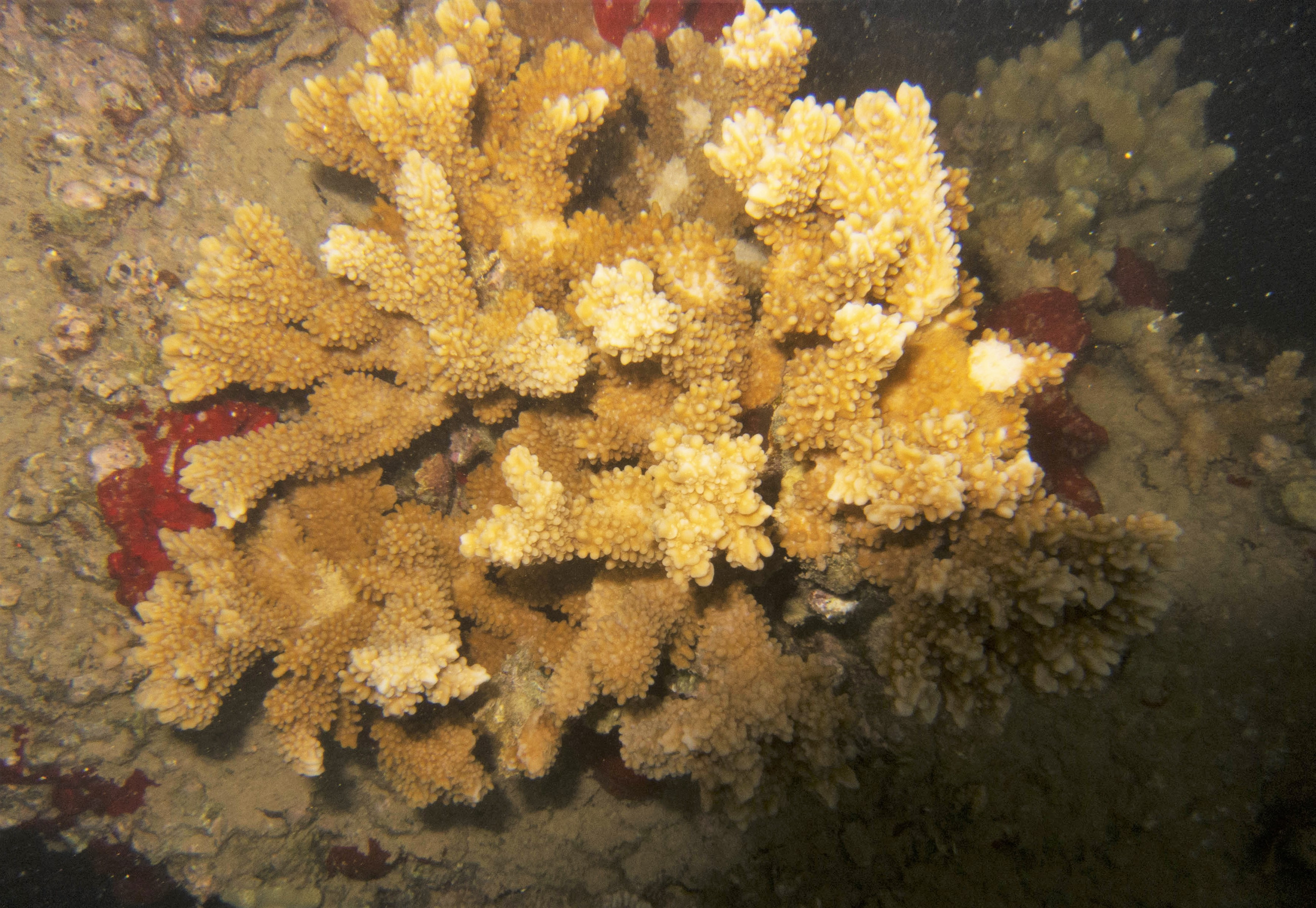
Branching colony of Montipora capitata in Hawaii

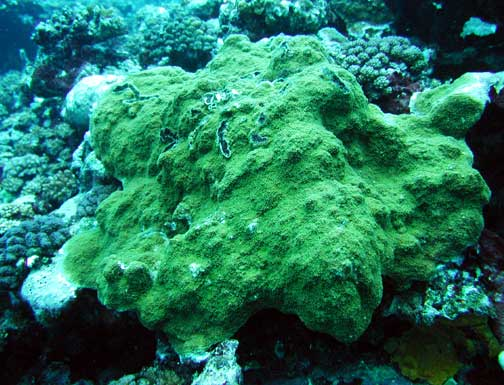
Encrusting colony of Montipora capitata

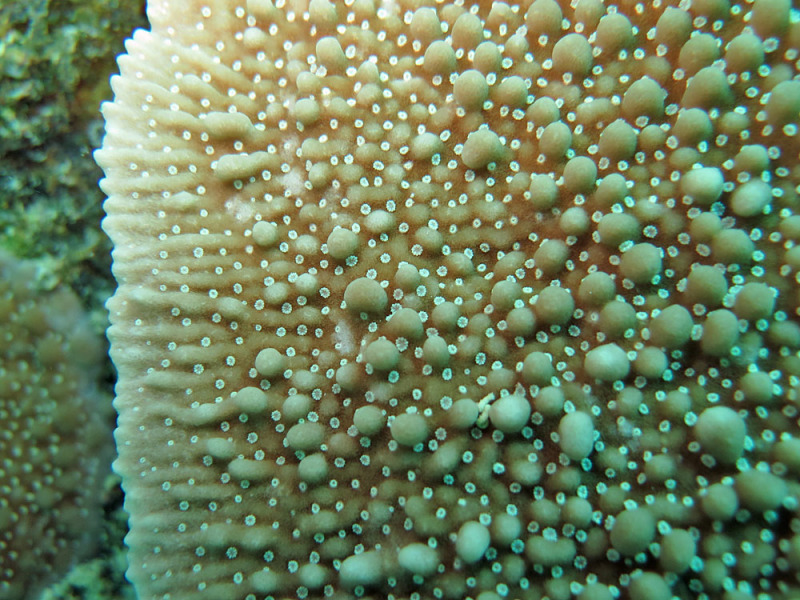
Polyps of Montipora danae

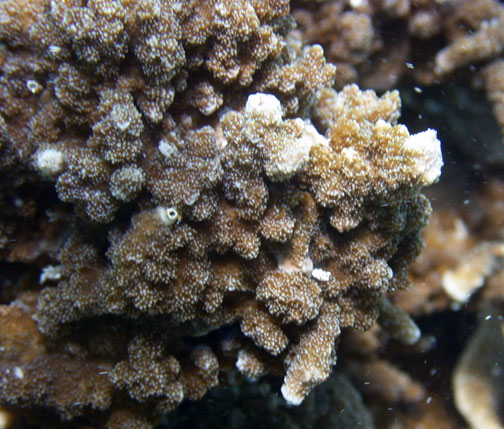
Montipora ehrenbergii

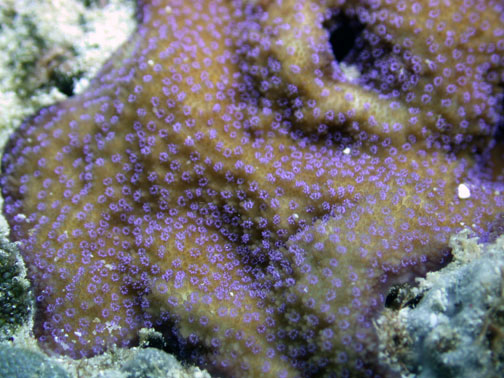
Montipora grisea

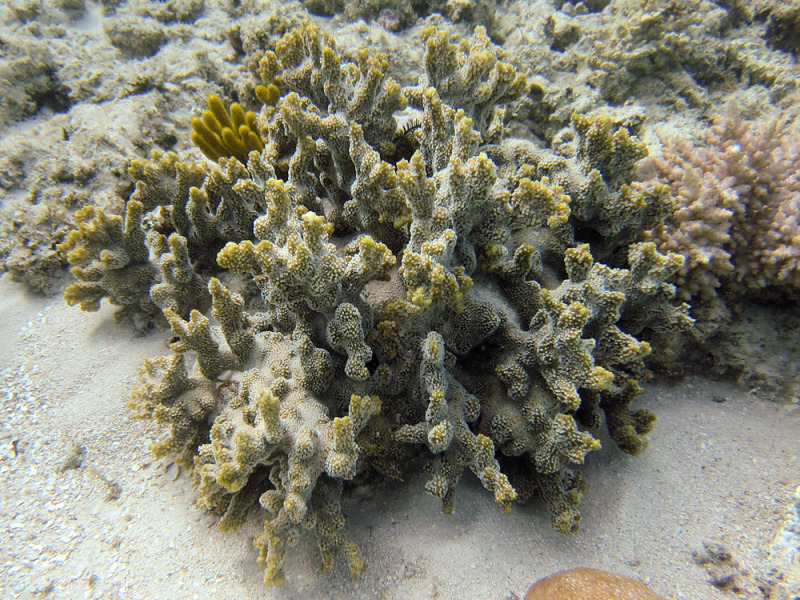
Montipora hispida

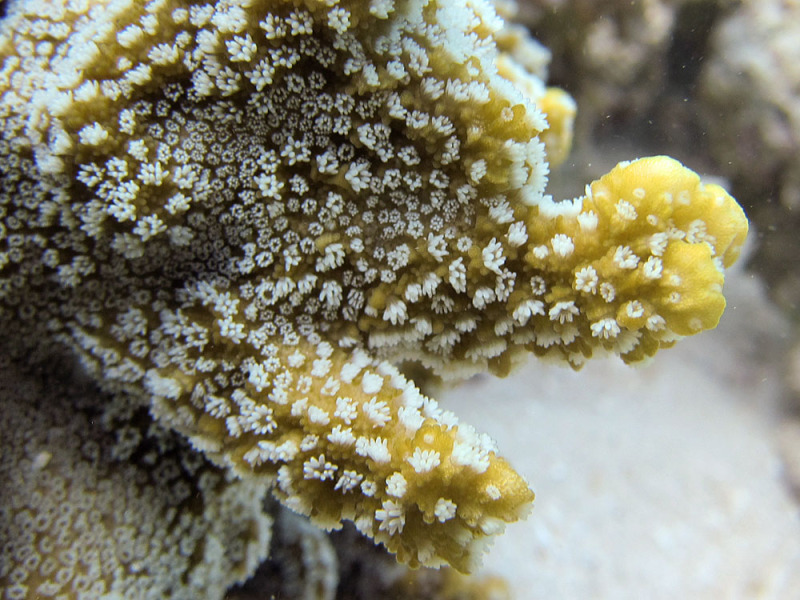
Polyps of Montipora hispida

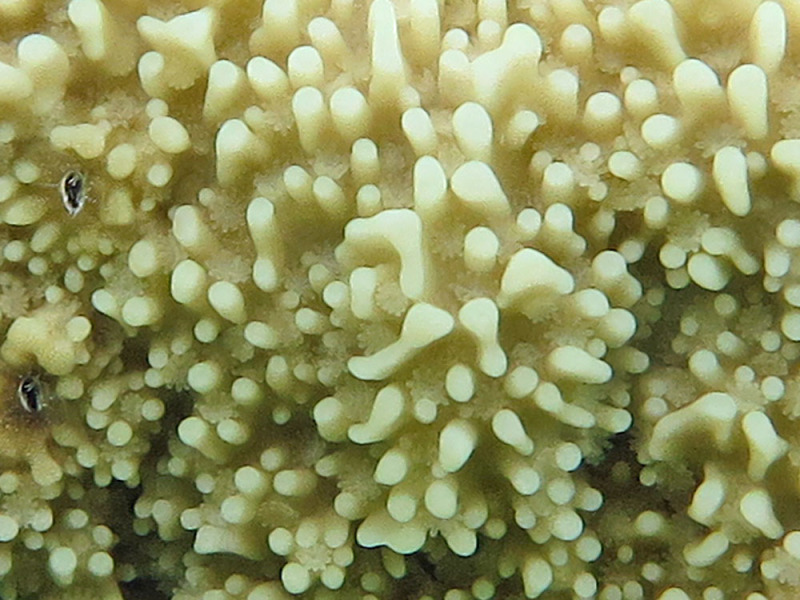
Polyps of Montipora monasteriata

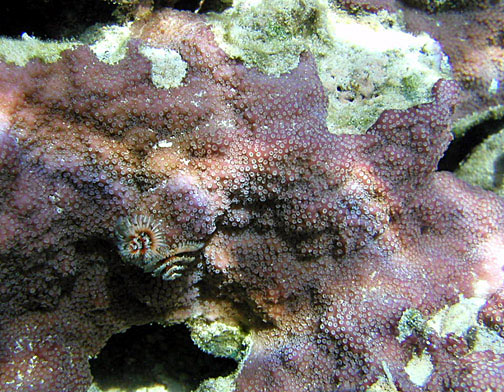
Montipora nodosa

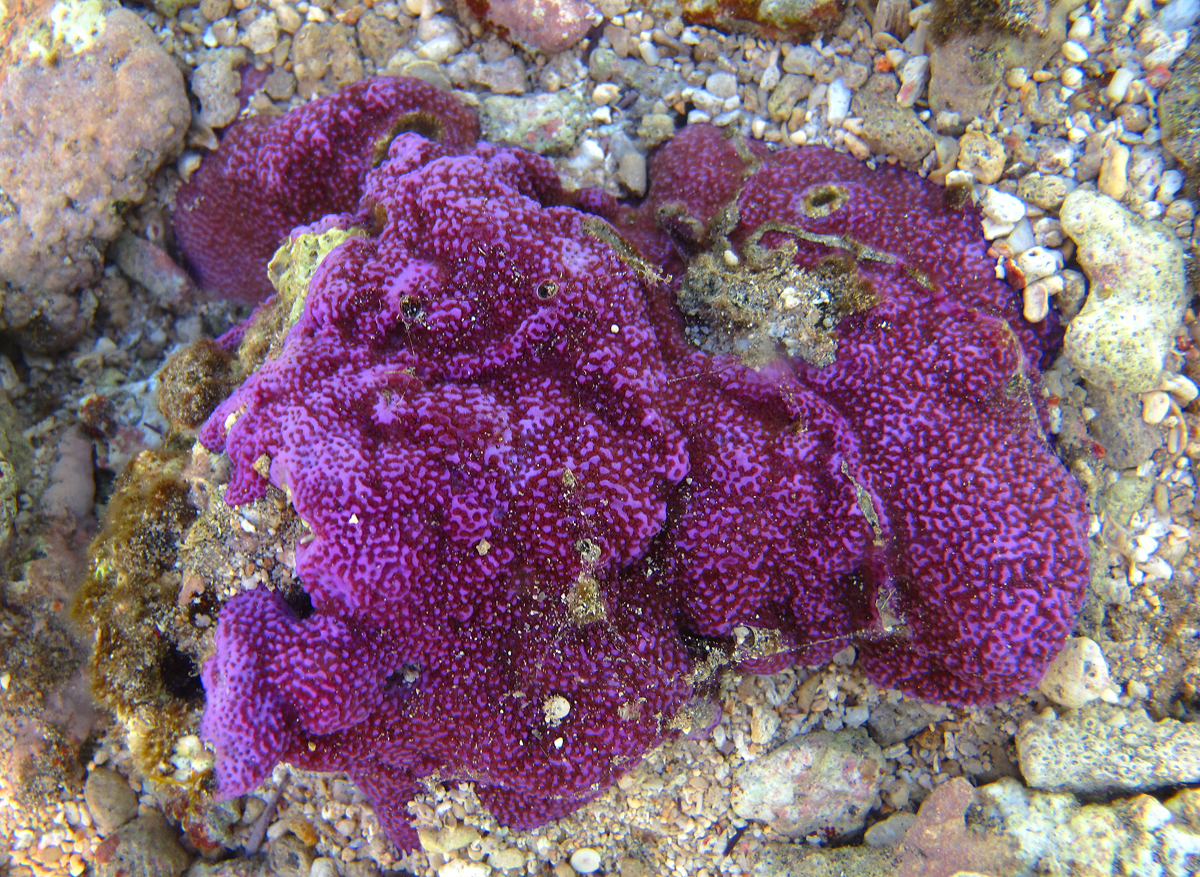
Montipora tuberculosa

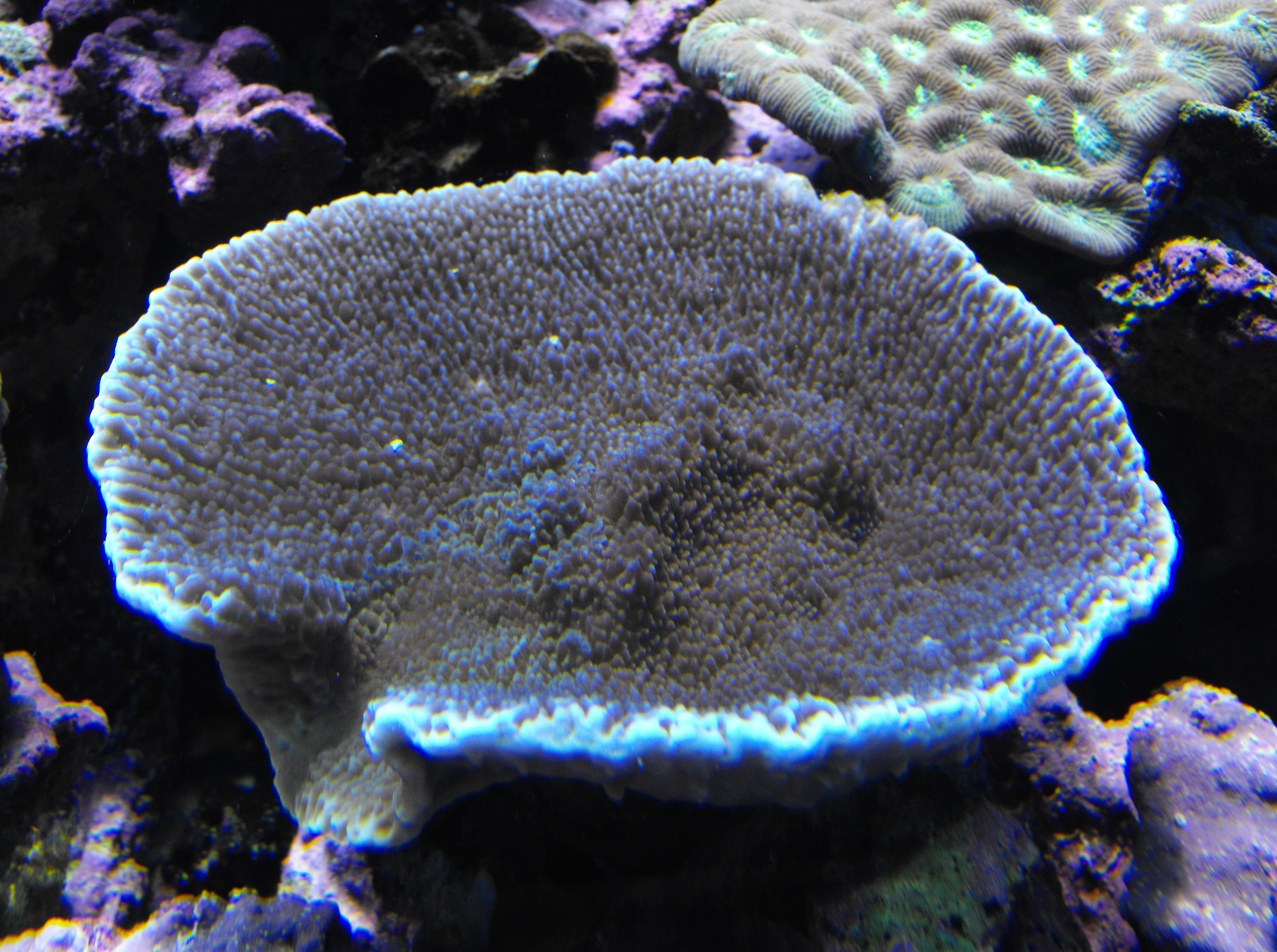
Montipora verrucosa at Birch Aquarium in San Diego, California

== Species ==
- Montipora aequituberculata Bernard, 1897
- Montipora altasepta Nemenzo, 1967
- Montipora angulata Lamarck, 1816
- Montipora aspergillus Veron, DeVantier & Turak, 2000
- Montipora australiensis Bernard, 1897
- Montipora biformis Nemenzo, 1988
- Montipora cactus Bernard, 1897
- Montipora calcarea Bernard, 1897
- Montipora calculata Dana, 1846
- Montipora capitata Dana, 1846
- Montipora capricornis Veron, 1985
- Montipora cebuensis Nemenzo, 1976
- Montipora circumvallata Ehrenberg, 1834
- Montipora cocosensis Vaughan, 1918
- Montipora confusa Nemenzo, 1967
- Montipora conspicua Nemenzo, 1979
- Montipora contorta Nemenzo & Montecillo, 1981
- Montipora corbettensis Veron & Wallace, 1984
- Montipora crassituberculata Bernard, 1897
- Montipora cryptus Veron, 2000
- Montipora danae Milne Edwards & Haime, 1851
- Montipora delicatula Veron, 2000
- Montipora digitata Dana, 1846
- Montipora dilatata Studer, 1901
- Montipora echinata Veron, DeVantier & Turak, 2000
- Montipora edwardsi Bernard, 1897
- Montipora efflorescens Bernard, 1897
- Montipora effusa Dana, 1846
- Montipora ehrenbergi Verrill, 1872
- Montipora explanata Brüggemann, 1879
- Montipora flabellata Studer, 1901
- Montipora florida Nemenzo, 1967
- Montipora floweri Wells, 1954
- Montipora foliosa Pallas, 1766
- Montipora foveolata Dana, 1846
- Montipora friabilis Bernard, 1897
- Montipora gaimardi Bernard, 1897
- Montipora gracilis Klunzinger, 1879
- Montipora grisea Bernard, 1897
- Montipora hemispherica Veron, 2000
- Montipora hirsuta Nemenzo, 1967
- Montipora hispida Dana, 1846
- Montipora hodgsoni Veron, 2000
- Montipora hoffmeisteri Wells, 1954
- Montipora incrassata Dana, 1846
- Montipora informis Bernard, 1897
- Montipora kellyi Veron, 2000
- Montipora lobulata Bernard, 1897
- Montipora mactanensis Nemenzo, 1979
- Montipora malampaya Nemenzo, 1967
- Montipora maldivensis Pillai & Scheer, 1976
- Montipora manauliensis Pillai, 1967
- Montipora meandrina Ehrenberg, 1834
- Montipora millepora Crossland, 1952
- Montipora mollis Bernard, 1897
- Montipora monasteriata Forskåi, 1775
- Montipora niugini Veron, 2000
- Montipora nodosa Dana, 1846
- Montipora orientalis Nemenzo, 1967
- Montipora pachytuberculata Veron, DeVantier & Turak
- Montipora palawanensis Veron, 2000
- Montipora patula Verrill, 1870
- Montipora peltiformis Bernard, 1897
- Montipora porites Veron, 2000
- Montipora samarensis Nemenzo, 1967
- Montipora saudii Veron, DeVantier & Turak
- Montipora setosa Nemenzo, 1976
- Montipora sinuosa Pillai & Scheer, 1976
- Montipora spongiosa Ehrenberg, 1834
- Montipora spongodes Bernard, 1897
- Montipora spumosa Lamarck, 1816
- Montipora stellata Bernard, 1897
- Montipora stilosa
- Montipora suvadivae Pillai & Scheer, 1976
- Montipora taiwanensis Veron, 2000
- Montipora tortuosa Dana, 1846
- Montipora tuberculosa Lamarck, 1816
- Montipora turgescens Bernard, 1897
- Montipora turtlensis Veron & Wallace, 1984
- Montipora undata Bernard, 1897
- Montipora venosa Ehrenberg, 1834
- Montipora verrilli Vaughan, 1907
- Montipora verrucosa Lamarck, 1816
- Montipora verruculosa Veron, 2000
- Montipora vietnamensis Veron, 2000
