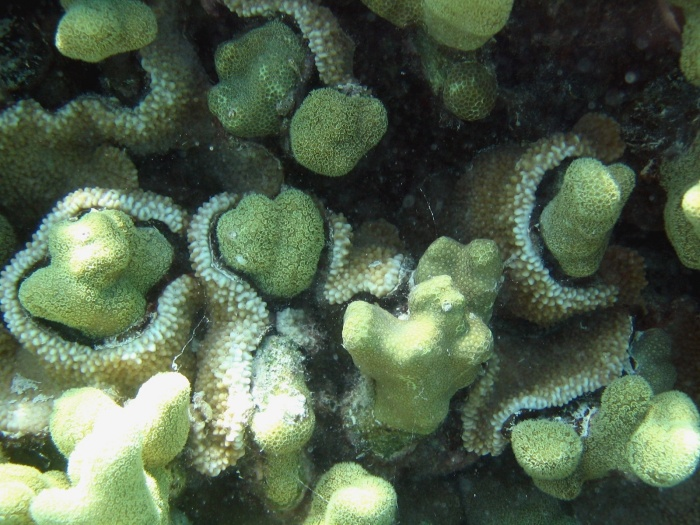
- Montipora capitata overgrowing Porites compressa

Conservation status
- Endangered (IUCN 3.1)

Scientific classification
- Kingdom: Animalia
- Phylum: Cnidaria
- Subphylum: Anthozoa
- Class: Hexacorallia
- Order: Scleractinia
- Family: Acroporidae
- Genus: Montipora
- Species: M. capitata

Binomial name
- Montipora capitata Dana, 1846

Synonyms
- Manopora capitata Dana, 1846

= Montipora capitata =

Species of coral

Montipora capitata, commonly known as rice coral or pore coral, is a stony coral in the family Acroporidae. It is a reef building species and is found in tropical parts of the Pacific Ocean.

== Description ==
Montipora capitata is an encrusting, colonial coral which develops arborescent forms as it matures. The corallites are tiny and well separated by cœnosteum. Their walls and the septa are indistinct. The skeleton is porous and there are small smooth surface projections known as verrucae which give the coral its common name of rice coral. These are irregularly spaced and may be fused near the tips of branches. The colour is normally pale brown with white verrucae.

== Distribution ==
Montipora capitata is found in the tropical north and central Pacific Ocean at depths down to 20 metres (70 ft). It is common in the waters around Hawaii especially where the sea is turbulent.

== Ecology ==
The crown-of-thorns starfish (Acanthaster planci), seems to preferentially feed on corals of the genus Montipora. It is a voracious predator and can have devastating effects on slow growing corals.

== Threats ==
Like other reef corals, Montipora capitata is threatened by habitat destruction. Rising sea temperatures can cause "bleaching" because the symbiotic zooxanthellae are expelled from the coral's tissues, leaving the coral colorless. The bleaching event results in very high coral mortality soon after. Stressed corals are more susceptible to disease. Other threats are posed by El Nino events, ocean acidification which tends to dissolve the coral skeleton, trawling and other fishing activities, pollution and sedimentation.
