= Thalassomonas =

Scientific classification
- Domain: Bacteria
- Kingdom: Pseudomonadati
- Phylum: Pseudomonadota
- Class: Gammaproteobacteria
- Order: Alteromonadales
- Family: Colwelliaceae
- Genus: Thalassomonas; Macián et al. 2001

Type species
- Thalassomonas viridans Macián et al. 2001

Species
- Thalassomonas actiniarum Thalassomonas haliotis Thalassomonas viridans

Genus of bacteria

Thalassomonas is a genus of bacteria from the family Colwelliaceae. Thalassomonas bacteria can cause the coral diseases white plague.
