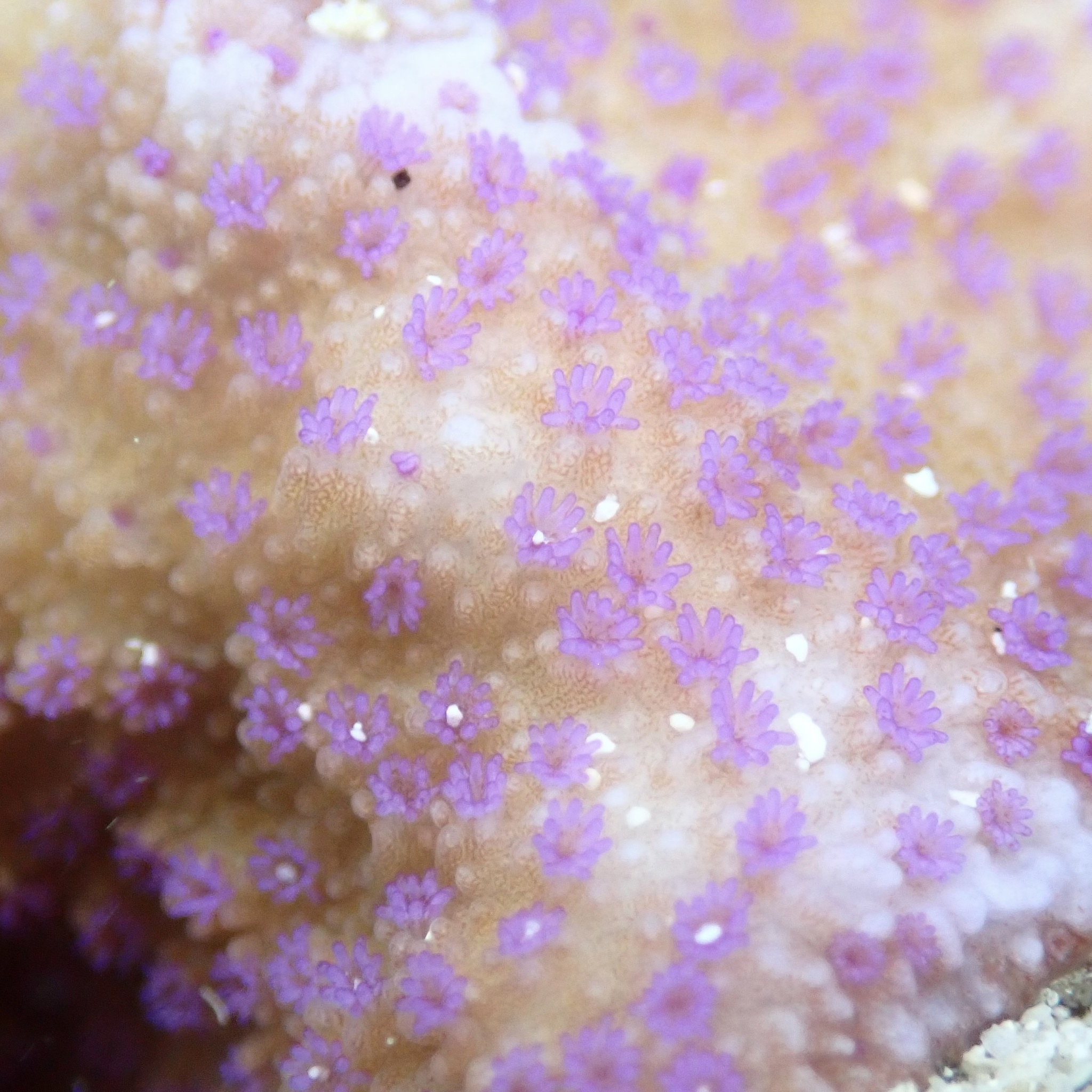

Conservation status
- Critically Endangered (IUCN 3.1)

Scientific classification
- Kingdom: Animalia
- Phylum: Cnidaria
- Subphylum: Anthozoa
- Class: Hexacorallia
- Order: Scleractinia
- Family: Acroporidae
- Genus: Montipora
- Species: M. patula

Binomial name
- Montipora patula Verrill, 1869

= Montipora patula =

Species of coral

Montipora patula, also called the sandpaper or ringed rice coral, is a coral species in the family Acroporidae endemic to Hawaii and is considered a vulnerable species.

== Description ==
Montipora patula form small, encrusting colonies or tiered plates that are brownish in color with lighter borders. These plates have free edges and can reach over 2 metres (7 ft) across. Corallites are irregular in height and are generally small. Around the corallites are small papillae, that are usually tan in color. Polyps are usually purple in color.

== Distribution & habitat ==
Montipora patula is endemic to the Hawaiian Islands. This species prefers shallow reef environments living along reef flats.
