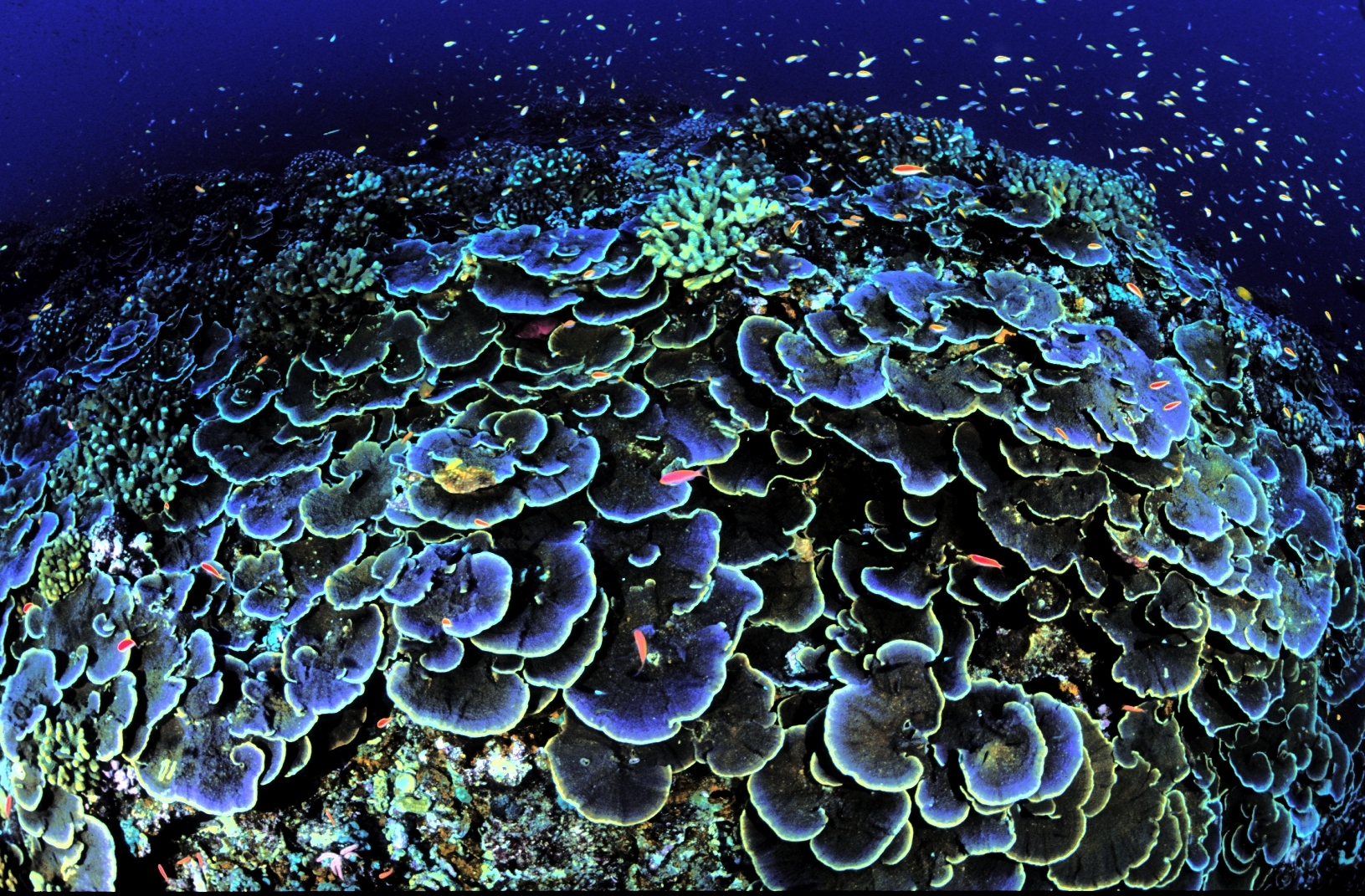

Conservation status
- Endangered (IUCN 3.1)

Scientific classification
- Kingdom: Animalia
- Phylum: Cnidaria
- Subphylum: Anthozoa
- Class: Hexacorallia
- Order: Scleractinia
- Family: Acroporidae
- Genus: Montipora
- Species: M. aequituberculata

Binomial name
- Montipora aequituberculata Bernard, 1897

Synonyms
- Montipora amplectens Bernard, 1897; Montipora composita Crossland, 1952; Montipora ellisi Bernard, 1897; Montipora erythraea Marenzeller, 1907

= Montipora aequituberculata =

Species of coral

Montipora aequituberculata is a species of stony coral in the family Acroporidae. It is a common coral in shallow water in the Indo-Pacific region.

== Distribution and habitat ==
Corallites of Montipora aequituberculata

Montipora aequituberculata is native to the Indo-Pacific region. Its range extends from the Red Sea and Gulf of Aden, through the Indian Ocean to Japan, the East China Sea, Australia and the west and central Pacific. It is found on the upper parts of reef slopes where it may be the most predominant species.

== Biology ==
Montipora aequituberculata is a zooxanthellate species of coral. It obtains most of its nutritional needs from the symbiotic dinoflagellates that live inside its soft tissues. These photosynthetic organisms provide the coral with organic carbon and nitrogen, sometimes providing up to 90% of their host's energy needs for metabolism and growth. Its remaining needs are met by the planktonic organisms caught by the tentacles of the polyps.

== Status ==
Like other reef corals, Montipora aequituberculata is threatened by habitat destruction. Rising sea temperatures can cause "bleaching" because the symbiotic zooxanthellae are expelled from the coral's tissues, leaving the coral colorless. The bleaching event results in very high coral mortality soon after. Stressed corals are more susceptible to disease. Other threats are posed by El Nino events, ocean acidification which tends to dissolve the coral skeleton, trawling and other fishing activities, pollution and sedimentation. This is a common species in shallow reef environments and the International Union for Conservation of Nature has assessed its conservation status as being of "least concern".
