= Piezophile =

Organisms living under high hydrostatic pressure

A piezophile (from Greek "piezo-" for pressure and "-phile" for loving) is an organism with optimal growth under high hydrostatic pressure, i.e., an organism that has its maximum rate of growth at a hydrostatic pressure equal to or above 10 megapascals (99 atm; 1,500 psi), when tested over all permissible temperatures. Originally, the term barophile was used for these organisms, but since the prefix "baro-" stands for weight, the term piezophile was given preference. Like all definitions of extremophiles, the definition of piezophiles is anthropocentric, and humans consider that moderate values for hydrostatic pressure are those around 1 atm (= 0.1 MPa = 14.7 psi), whereas those "extreme" pressures are the normal living conditions for those organisms. Hyperpiezophiles are organisms that have their maximum growth rate above 50 MPa (= 493 atm = 7,252 psi).

Though the high hydrostatic pressure has deleterious effects on organisms growing at atmospheric pressure, these organisms which are solely found at high pressure habitats at deep sea in fact need high pressures for their optimum growth. Often their growth is able to continue at much higher pressures (such as 100MPa) compared to those organisms which normally grow at low pressures.

The first obligate piezophile found was a psychrophilic bacteria called Colwellia marinimaniae strain M-41. It was isolated from a decaying amphipod Hirondellea gigas from the bottom of Mariana Trench. The first thermophilic piezophilic archaea Pyrococcus yayanosii strain CH1 was isolated from the Ashadze site, a deep sea hydrothermal vent. Strain MT-41 has an optimal growth pressure at 70MPa at 2 °C and strain CH1 has a optimal growth pressure at 52MPa at 98 °C. They are unable to grow at pressures lower than or equal to 20MPa, and both can grow at pressures above 100MPa.The current record for highest hydrostatic pressure where growth was observed is 140MPa shown by Colwellia marinimaniae MTCD1. The term "obligate piezophile" refers to organisms that are unable to grow under lower hydrostatic pressures, such as 0.1 MPa. In contrast, piezotolerant organisms are those that have their maximum rate of growth at a hydrostatic pressure under 10 MPa, but that nevertheless are able to grow at lower rates under higher hydrostatic pressures.

Most of the Earth's biosphere (in terms of volume) is subject to high hydrostatic pressure, and the piezosphere comprises the deep sea (at the depth of 1,000 m and greater) plus the deep subsurface (which can extend up to 5,000 m beneath the seafloor or the continental surface). The deep sea has a mean temperature around 1 to 3 °C, and it is dominated by psychropiezophiles. In contrast, deep subsurface and hydrothermal vents in the seafloor are dominated by thermopiezophiles that prosper in temperatures above 45 °C (113 °F).

Although the study of nutrient acquisition and metabolism within the piezosphere is still in its infancy, it is understood that most of the organic matter present are refractory complex polymers from the eutrophic zone. Both heterotrophic metabolism and autotrophic fixation are present within the piezosphere and additional research suggests significant metabolism of iron-bearing minerals and carbon monoxide. Additional research is required to fully understand and characterize piezosphere metabolism.

== Piezophilic adaptations ==
High pressure has several effects on biological systems. The application of pressure results in equilibrium shifting towards state occupying small volume and it changes intermolecular distances and affects conformations. This also has an effect on the functionality of the cells. Piezophiles employ several mechanisms to adapt themselves to these high hydrostatic pressures. They regulate gene expression according to pressure and also adapt their biomolecules to differences in pressure.

=== Nucleic acids ===
High pressure stabilizes hydrogen bonds and stacking interactions of the DNA. Thus it favours the double stranded duplex structure of the DNA. However, to carry out several processes like DNA replication, transcription and translation, the transition to single-strand structure is necessary, which becomes difficult as high pressure increases the melting temperature, Tm. Thus, these processes may face difficulties.

=== Cell membranes ===
When pressure increases, the fluidity of the cell membrane is decreased as due to restrictions in volume they change their conformation and packing. This decreases the permeability of the cell membrane to water and different molecules. In response to flucatuation in environment, they change their membrane structures. Piezophilic bacteria do so by varying their acyl chain length, by accumulating unsaturated fatty acids, accumulating specific polar headgroups and branched fatty acids. Piezophilic archaea synthesize archaeol and cadarchaeol-based polar lipids, bipolar tetraether lipids, incorporate cyclopentane rings and increase in unsaturation.

=== Proteins ===
The macromolecules bearing the largest effect of pressure are proteins. Just like lipids, they change their conformation and packing to accommodate changes in pressure. This affects their multimeric conformation, stability and also the structure of their catalytic sites, which changes their functionality. In pressure-intolerant species, proteins tend to compact and unfold under high pressures as overall volume is reduced. Piezophilic proteins, however, tend to have less void space and smaller void spaces overall to mitigate compaction and unfolding pressures. There are also changes in the various interactions between amino acids. In general, they are very resistant to pressure.

=== Enzymes ===
Due to the functional nature of enzymes, piezophiles must maintain their activity to survive. High pressures tend to favor enzymes with higher flexibility at the cost of lower stability. Additionally, piezophilic enzymes often have high absolute (distinct from temperature or pressure) and relative catalytic activity. This allows the enzymes to maintain sufficient activity even with decreases due to temperature or pressure effects. Furthermore, some piezophilic enzymes have increasing catalytic activity with increasing pressures, though this is not a generalization for all piezophilic enzymes.

=== Overall effect on cells ===
As a result of high pressure, several functions may be lost in organisms that are pressure-intolerant. Effects can include loss of flagellar motility, enzyme function, and thus metabolism. It can also lead to cell death due to modifications in the cellular structure. High pressures also can cause an imbalance in oxidation and reduction reactions generating relatively high concentrations of reactive oxygen species (ROS). An increased amount of anti-oxidation genes and proteins are found in piezophiles to combat the ROS as they often cause cellular damage.

== See also ==
- Extremophile
- Thermophile
- Psychrophile
- Archaea
- Bacteria
- Cell membrane
