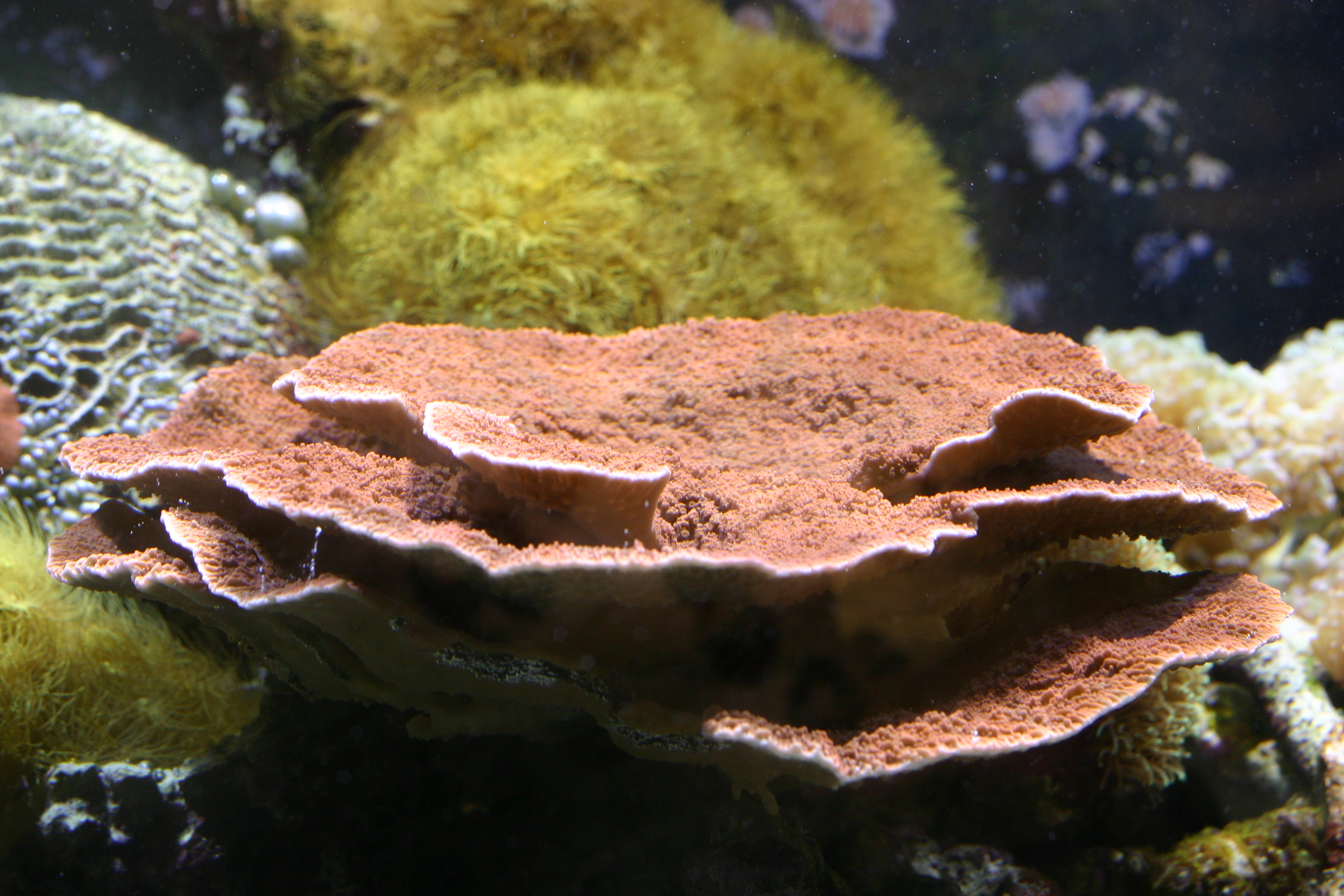
- Montipora capricornis, probably in a reef aquarium

Conservation status
- Endangered (IUCN 3.1)

Scientific classification
- Kingdom: Animalia
- Phylum: Cnidaria
- Subphylum: Anthozoa
- Class: Hexacorallia
- Order: Scleractinia
- Family: Acroporidae
- Genus: Montipora
- Species: M. capricornis

Binomial name
- Montipora capricornis Veron, 1985

= Leaf plate montipora =

Species of coral

Montipora capricornis, also known as the leaf plate montipora, vase coral, cap coral, or plating montipora, is a type of small polyp stony (SPS) coral in the family Acroporidae.

== Description ==
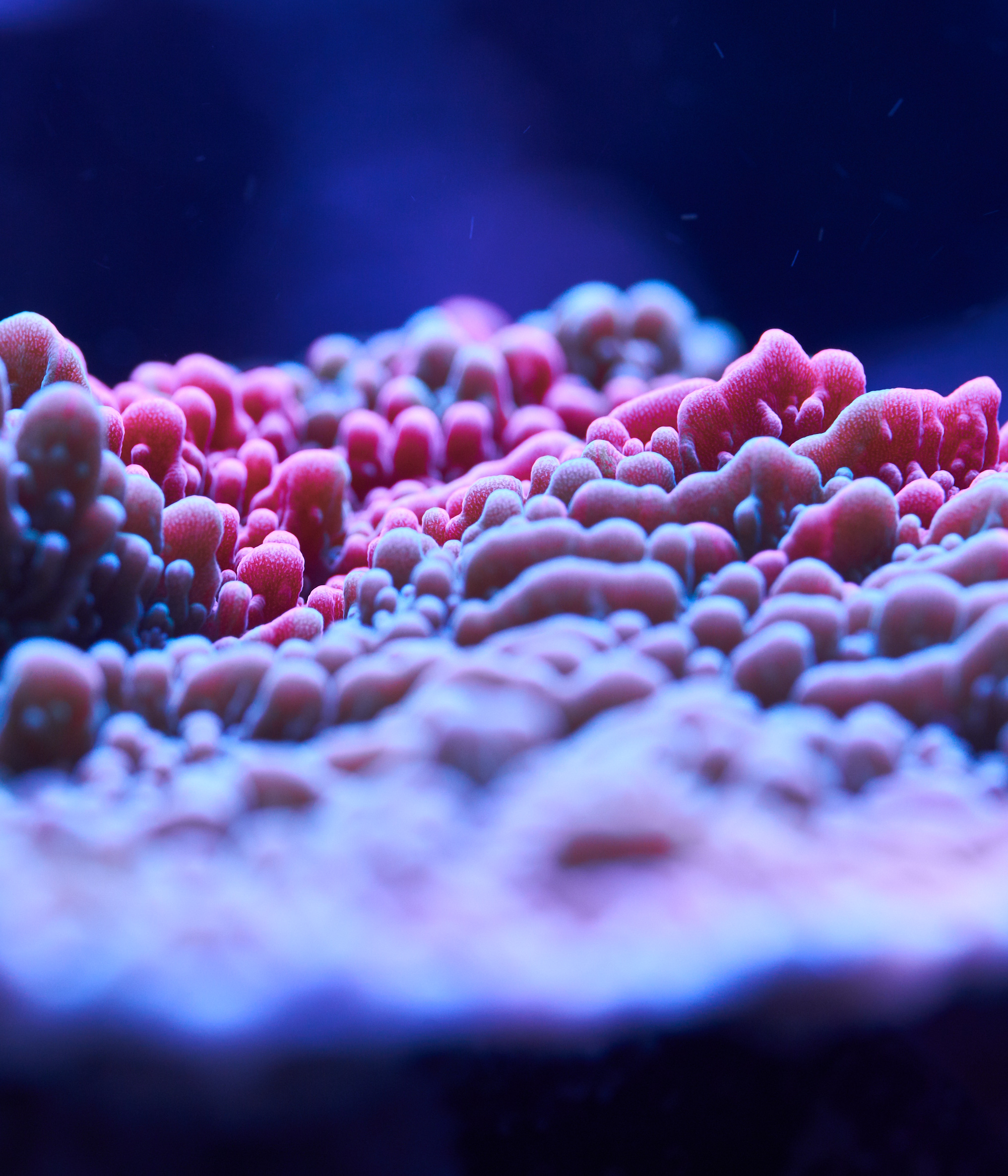
A macro phtoto of Montipora sp. showing surface texture.

M. capricornis forms flat, plating colonies. The colonies expand by adding to their foundations and further spreading out. The individual polyps appear as small "bumps" on the surface of the skeleton. At night, the polyps emerge from the skeleton to feed on plankton. The polyps are usually transparent with slight patches of color due to zooxanthellae, symbiotic algae living in the coral's tissue.

== Habitat ==
M. capricornis is a very common species of coral, particularly in the Indian and Pacific oceans, as well as in reefs in the Red Sea. It usually inhabits the top half of the reef where photosynthesis can occur. M. capricornis will "branch out" from their foundation into an area with adequate sunlight. It also lives in coral reefs and enjoys warm sunny temperatures.

== Aquarium trade ==
M. capricornis is one of the more common species of SPS coral available on the market. It comes in various color variations, including red, green, and orange. It is considered to be a good beginner's SPS coral, because it is much more tolerant of under-ideal conditions than its relative, Acropora. M. capricornis prefers to live in a reef aquarium, if brought into captivity. This Montipora coral prefers a water temperature of a stable 75 to 80 °F (24 to 27 °C). It prefers strong lighting such as that provided by metal halides, but even a modest compact fluorescent lighting system can be sufficient.
