= Colwelliaceae =

Scientific classification
- Domain: Bacteria
- Kingdom: Pseudomonadati
- Phylum: Pseudomonadota
- Class: Gammaproteobacteria
- Order: Alteromonadales
- Family: Colwelliaceae

Genera
- Colwellia; Litorilituus; Thalassotalea; Thalassomonas

Family of bacteria

The Colwelliaceae are a family of Pseudomonadota. This family consists of facultative anaerobes and has non-motile and motile members.

Colwelliaceae is a family containing Gram-negative bacteria with rod-shaped to curved rod-shaped cells that play a role in the decomposition of organic matter. Several members of the family are facultative anaerobes, meaning that they are also they can grow with the presence of oxygen and without the presence of oxygen. As well as certain Colwelliaceae such as Colwellia psychrerythraea are psychrophilic bacteria meaning they can thrive in cold environments with them thriving at around the temperature of −6 to 18 °C (21 to 64 °F). They are usually found in cold marine environments such as sea ice, the pelagic zone particulates, and superficial marine sediments.
