= Kappa-Carrageenase =

Class of enzymes

κ-Carrageenase

Identifiers
- EC no.: 3.2.1.83
- CAS no.: 37288-59-8

Databases
- IntEnz: IntEnz view
- BRENDA: BRENDA entry
- ExPASy: NiceZyme view
- KEGG: KEGG entry
- MetaCyc: metabolic pathway
- PRIAM: profile
- PDB structures: RCSB PDB PDBe PDBsum
Search
- PMC: articles
- PubMed: articles
- NCBI: proteins

κ-Carrageenase (EC 3.2.1.83, κ-carrageenan 4-β-D-glycanohydrolase) is an enzyme with systematic name κ-carrageenan 4-β-D-glycanohydrolase (configuration-retaining). It catalyses the endohydrolysis of (1→4)-β-D-linkages between D-galactose 4-sulfate and 3,6-anhydro-D-galactose in κ-carrageenans

The main products of hydrolysis are neocarrabiose-sulfate and neocarratetraose-sulfate.
