= Euphyllia paraglabrescens =

Conservation status
- Least Concern (IUCN 3.1)

Scientific classification
- Kingdom: Animalia
- Phylum: Cnidaria
- Subphylum: Anthozoa
- Class: Hexacorallia
- Order: Scleractinia
- Family: Euphylliidae
- Genus: Euphyllia
- Species: E. paraglabrescens

Binomial name
- Euphyllia paraglabrescens Veron, 1990

Species of coral

Euphyllia paraglabrescens is a species of large-polyped stony coral belonging to the Euphylliidae family. The International Union for Conservation of Nature has listed it as a vulnerable species, stating "its threat susceptibility increases the likelihood of being lost within one generation."

== Description ==
Colonies of Euphyllia paraglabrescens are almost identical to those of Euphyllia glabrescens with short, bubble-like tentacles that extend at night with cnidocytes.

== Distribution and habitat ==
It is the dominant species of Ôjioya Port, Tanegashima, Japan, the only place where this species has been found.

Euphyllia paraglabrescens attaches to sandstone rock in shallow water at depths of 5 – 15 meters.
