= Bubble coral =

Bubble coral may refer to two different species of coral:

- Euphyllia baliensis, found off Bali, Indonesia
- Plerogyra sinuosa, found from the Red Sea to the west Pacific Ocean, from the East China Sea to the Line Islands
