= Grape coral =

Grape coral may refer to two different species of sea anemone:

- Euphyllia cristata, found in the Indo-Pacific Ocean area
- Plerogyra sinuosa, found in the western Indian Ocean and the Red Sea
