= Ridge coral =

Ridge coral may refer to several different taxa:

- Catalaphyllia jardinei, a species of coral in the family Euphylliidae
- Euphyllia ancora, a species of coral in the family Euphylliidae
- species of the genus Turbinaria (coral)
