= Fimbriaphyllia paradivisa =

Conservation status
- Least Concern (IUCN 3.1)

- Threatened (ESA)

Scientific classification
- Kingdom: Animalia
- Phylum: Cnidaria
- Subphylum: Anthozoa
- Class: Hexacorallia
- Order: Scleractinia
- Family: Euphylliidae
- Genus: Fimbriaphyllia
- Species: F. paradivisa

Binomial name
- Fimbriaphyllia paradivisa (Veron, 1990)

Synonyms
- Euphyllia paradivisa Veron, 1990

Species of coral

Fimbriaphyllia paradivisa, the branching frogspawn coral, is a species of large-polyped stony coral belonging to the Euphylliidae family. It shares the common name of "frogspawn coral" with Euphyllia divisa, but is differentiated as the "branching" frogspawn whereas Euphyllia divisa has a "wall" structure. It is a commonly kept species in the marine aquarium hobby.

Though Fimbriaphyllia paradivisa was previously considered a vulnerable species by the IUCN Red List, in 2024 its status was improved to least concern. It is threatened by many of the environmental issues with coral reefs such as increased sea surface temperature, ocean acidification, and overfishing for the marine aquarium trade. The National Oceanic and Atmospheric Administration has stated there is "a risk of extinction within the foreseeable future for Euphyllia paradivisa."

== Description ==
Colonies of Fimbriaphyllia paradivisa are made up of branching, separate corallites. Polyps have branching tentacles. Color is pale greenish-grey or pink (in rare instances) with lighter tentacle tips. Fimbriaphyllia paradivisa displays fluorescence when the chromatophores of its zooxanthellae and the coral host pigments are excited by blue-dominated light.

== Distribution and habitat ==
It is native to the Indo-Pacific islands, distributed mostly in the Coral Triangle area, and also found in the American Samoa. It prefers environments protected from surface wave action on fringing reef crests, mid-slope terraces, and lagoons at depths of 2 to 25 meters (6.6 to 82.0 ft).
