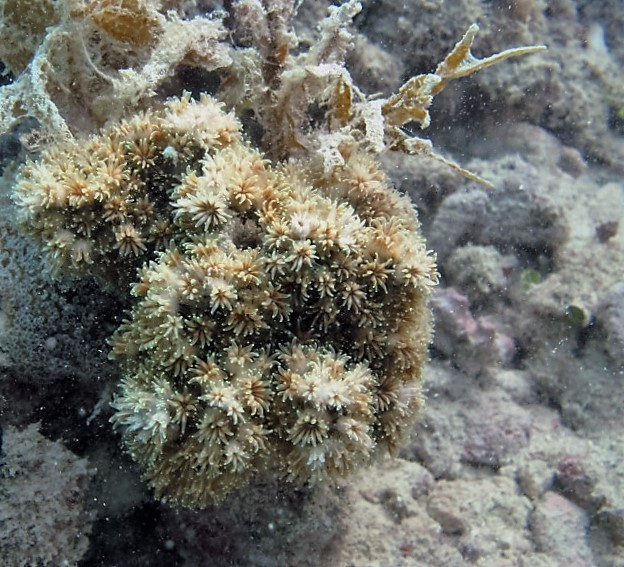

Conservation status
- Least Concern (IUCN 3.1)

Scientific classification
- Kingdom: Animalia
- Phylum: Cnidaria
- Subphylum: Anthozoa
- Class: Hexacorallia
- Order: Scleractinia
- Family: Euphylliidae
- Genus: Galaxea
- Species: G. acrhelia

Binomial name
- Galaxea acrhelia Veron, 2000

= Galaxea acrhelia =

Species of coral

Galaxea acrhelia is a large polyp stony coral in the family Euphylliidae.

== Distribution ==
It can be found uncommonly throughout the Indo-West Pacific with populations concentrating in Indonesia, the Philippines, Papua New Guinea, and the Solomon Islands.
