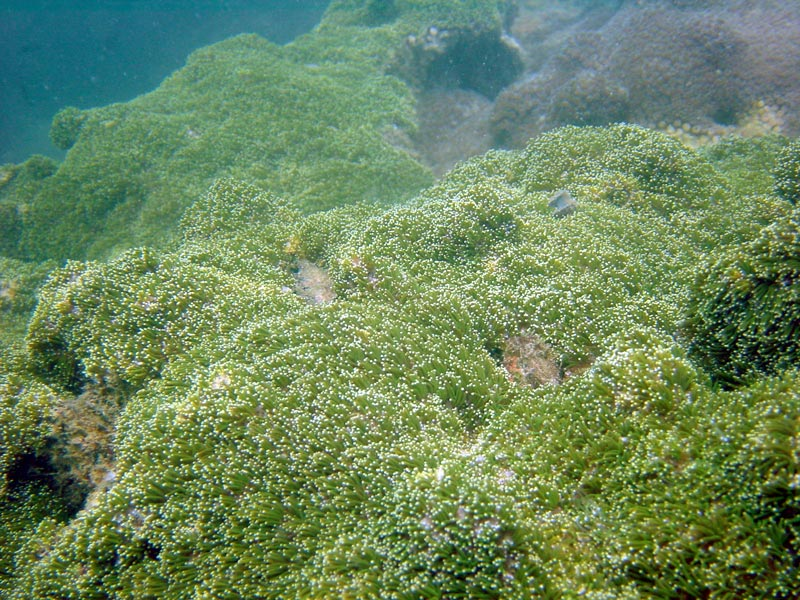

Conservation status
- Least Concern (IUCN 3.1)

Scientific classification
- Kingdom: Animalia
- Phylum: Cnidaria
- Subphylum: Anthozoa
- Class: Hexacorallia
- Order: Scleractinia
- Family: Euphylliidae
- Genus: Galaxea
- Species: G. astreata

Binomial name
- Galaxea astreata (Lamarck, 1816)

Synonyms
- List: Anthophyllum clavus Dana, 1846; Anthophyllum musicale (Linnaeus, 1767); Caryophyllia astreata Lamarck, 1816; Galaxea clavus Dana, 1846; Galaxea musicalis (Linnaeus, 1767); Galaxea negrensis Nemenzo, 1979; Galaxea susanae Nemenzo & Ferraris, 1982; Madrepora musicale Linnaeus, 1767

= Galaxea astreata =

Species of coral

Galaxea astreata is a common and cosmopolitan large polyp scleractinian coral, (stony, hard coral) in the family Euphylliidae. It has a sub-massive morphology. It is found in the Indo-Pacific and is the most abundant coral species in Xuwen Coral Reef National Nature Reserve. G. astreata is acclimatized to water temperatures ranging from about 27 ± 0.5 °C. It is generally a shallow-water coral and is commonly seen at a depth of around 15 meters. It can range from a depth of 1 meter to 30 meters. It generally prefers clear, salt waters over turbid brackish waters.

== Description ==
Galaxea astreata has a very distinctive skeleton structure, which is made of calcium carbonate (CaCO_{3}). Corallites, the skeletal cup formed by individual polyps, are very plate-like. They are about 3–4.5 in diameter. They are also well spaced. The coral can has a symbiotic relationship with zooxanthellae living inside of the coral. Colonies of G. astreata are either sub-massive, columnar, or encrusting, meaning they can either be irregularly shaped, growing upward like columns, or impinging on a hard substrate. Colonies can grow to be over two meters long. The polyps are usually found to be pink, grey, green, or brown in color.

== Feeding ==
Galaxea astreata eat zooplankton and coral larvae that float by. Corals tend to feed at night since planktivorous fishes are sleeping. G. astreata expands its polyps to feed during the day, and contracts them at night. It is an effective predator, and like other massive growth forms, G. astreata will be an even more efficient when the larvae starts sinking in the water column so that it is easier for the coral to catch.

== Reproduction ==
Galaxea astreata is a broadcast spawner, as gametes are released into the water for external fertilization. After the gamete is fertilized, the planulae, or the larval form of the coral, develops inside the plankton. G. astreata can either be a hermaphrodite, having both male and female gametes, or a gonochore, having gametes of only one sex.

== Threats and coral bleaching ==
The coral coverage rate in Xuwen rapidly decreased due to human activity and other environmental factors causing a decline in the G. astreata. Some detrimental human activities include overuse of fisheries and extraction, eutrophication and siltation, and pollution. Though G. astreata is more resistant to environmental changes than other coral species (i.e. Accropora spp.), it had a 100% mortality rate after the El Niño phenomenon of 1997–1998, starting with slow death of tissue fragments in the first 4 months after the disturbance. However, G. astreata was not the only coral affected, as this 1998 coral bleaching event reduced the richness of all coral species off the coast of Sesoko Island, Japan by 61% and reduced coral cover by 85%. Temperatures rose 2.8 °C above average from this one event alone. Coral bleaching events cause a loss of the symbiotic algae (zooxanthellae) and/or a loss of pigment (color mostly derived from zooxanthellae). It is a global phenomenon that is most likely linked to global climate change and rising ocean temperatures, as well as ocean acidification.

== Gallery ==
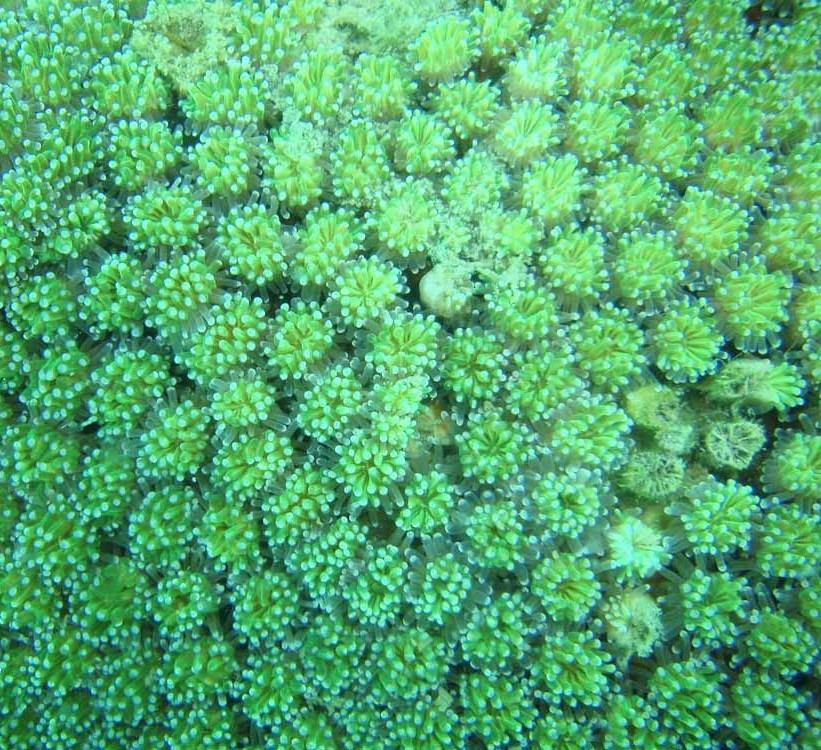

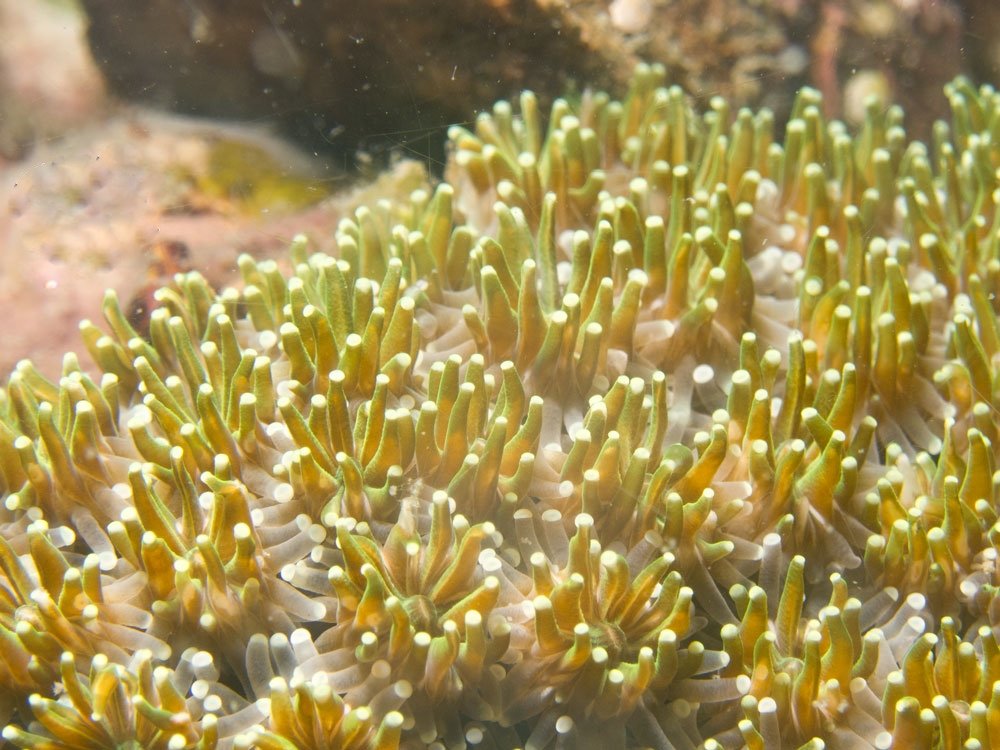

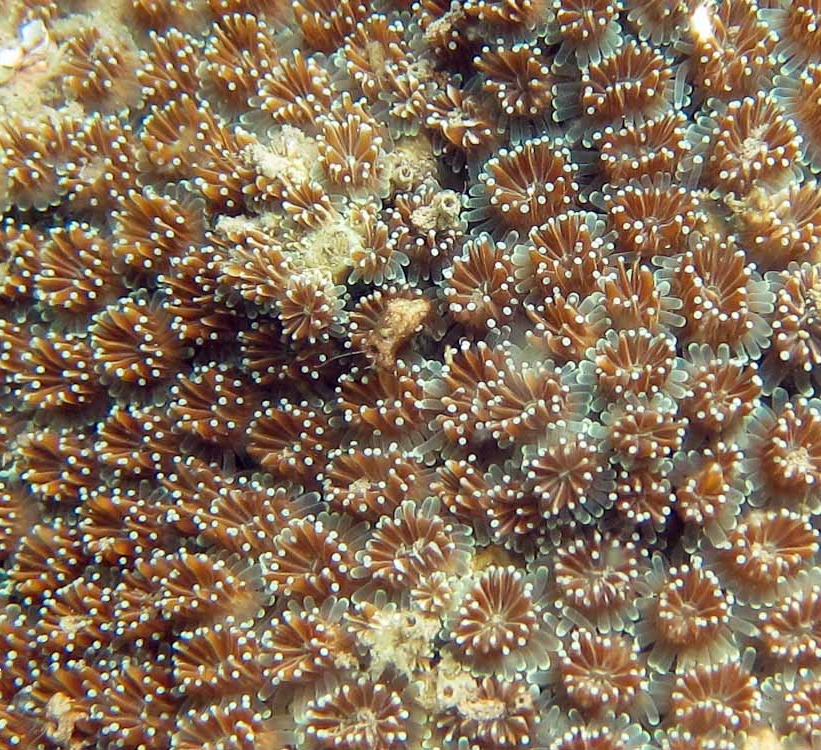

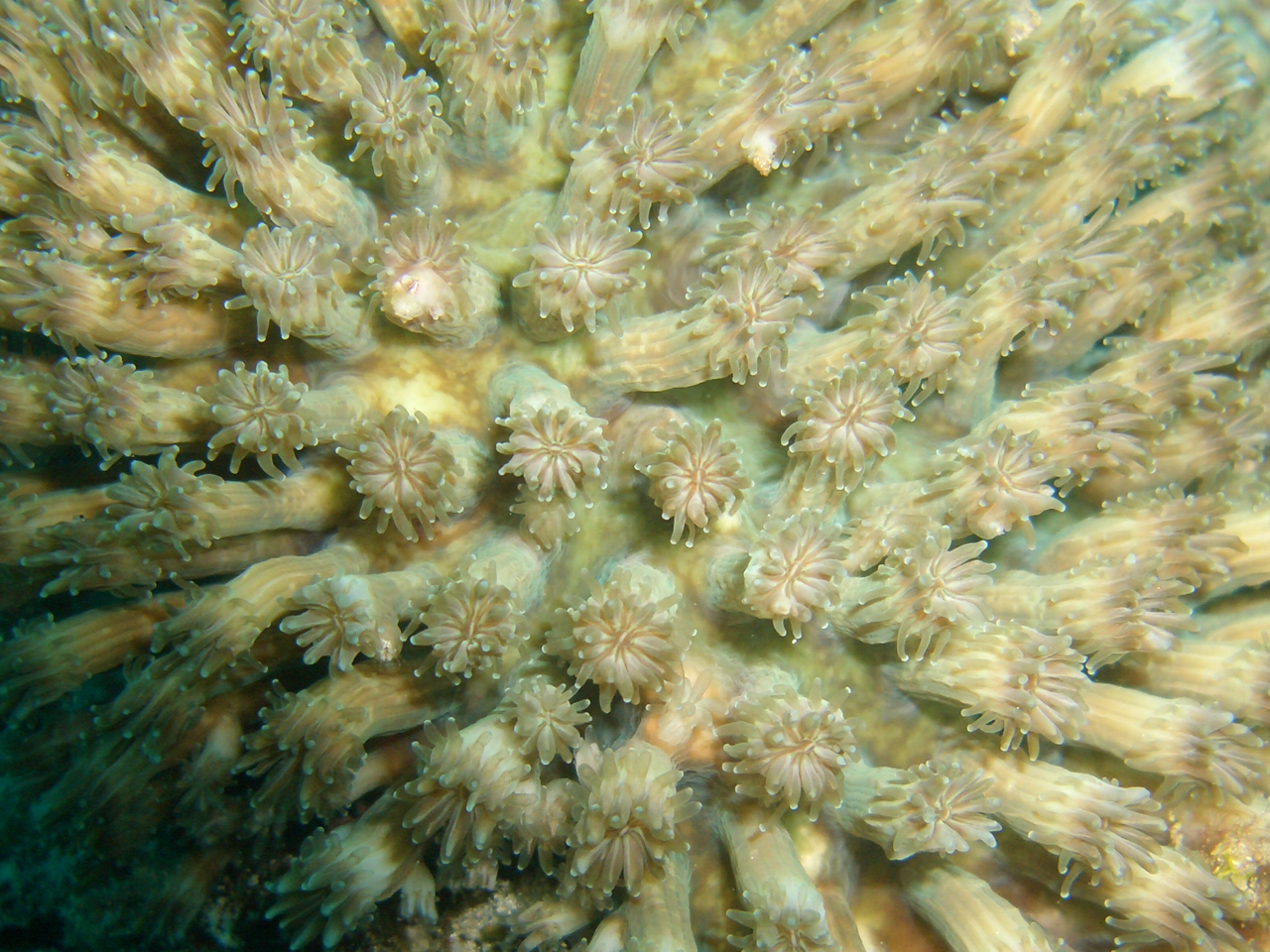
