= Aureisphaera galaxeae =

Scientific classification
- Domain: Bacteria
- Kingdom: Pseudomonadati
- Phylum: Bacteroidota
- Class: Flavobacteriia
- Order: Flavobacteriales
- Family: Flavobacteriaceae
- Genus: Aureisphaera
- Species: A. galaxeae

Binomial name
- Aureisphaera galaxeae Yoon et al. 2015

Type strain
- 04OKA003-7

Species of bacterium

Aureisphaera galaxeae is a Gram-negative, strictly aerobic and heterotrophic bacterium from the genus of Aureisphaera which has been isolated from the coral Galaxea fascicularis from Akajima.
