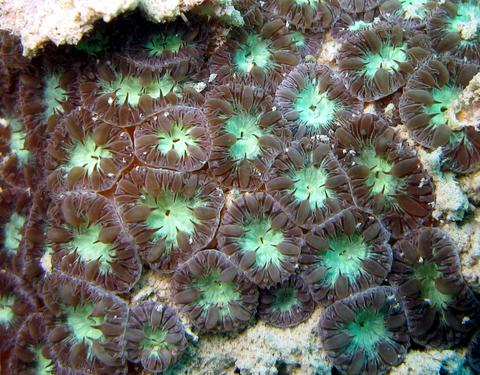
- In New Caledonia

Conservation status
- Least Concern (IUCN 3.1)

Scientific classification
- Kingdom: Animalia
- Phylum: Cnidaria
- Subphylum: Anthozoa
- Class: Hexacorallia
- Order: Scleractinia
- Family: Plerogyridae
- Genus: Blastomussa
- Species: B. wellsi

Binomial name
- Blastomussa wellsi Wijsman-Best, 1973

= Blastomussa wellsi =

Species of coral

Blastomussa wellsi is a species of large polyp stony coral. It is unclear in which family the genus Blastomussa belongs. This coral is found in the west and central Indo-Pacific region.

== Description ==
A colony of Blastomussa wellsi consists of a small group of corallites each with its own fleshy polyp. The mantle extends from the polyp over the corallite wall and obscures the underlying skeletal structure. The corallites are 9 to 14 millimetres (0.35 to 0.55 in) in diameter. The septa have small blunt teeth and are not arranged in orders. Some reach the columella in the centre of the calyx. This coral is brightly coloured, being dark red, green, grey or blue, often with contrasting oral discs.

== Ecology ==
The soft tissues of this coral contain symbiotic zooxanthellae which use sunlight to create organic compounds by photosynthesis which provide most of the coral's nutritional needs. The polyps supplement this by the capture of zooplankton with their tentacles and absorption of dissolved organic matter from the water.

This coral is hermaphrodite. Sperm and eggs are liberated into the water column where fertilisation takes place. The planula larvae form part of the plankton and drift with the currents. When they settle on the sea bed, they undergo metamorphosis into polyps. These secrete calcium carbonate to form the coral skeleton and multiply by extra-tentacular budding to form a new colony.

== Status ==
Blastomussa wellsi is an uncommon species of coral with a widespread distribution. The population trend is unknown but it is probable that the number of mature colonies is decreasing as a result of destruction of its reef habitats. It is also collected for the aquarium trade, Indonesia exporting 3,800 live pieces in 2005. Its conservation status has been assessed as being "near-threatened" by the International Union for Conservation of Nature.
