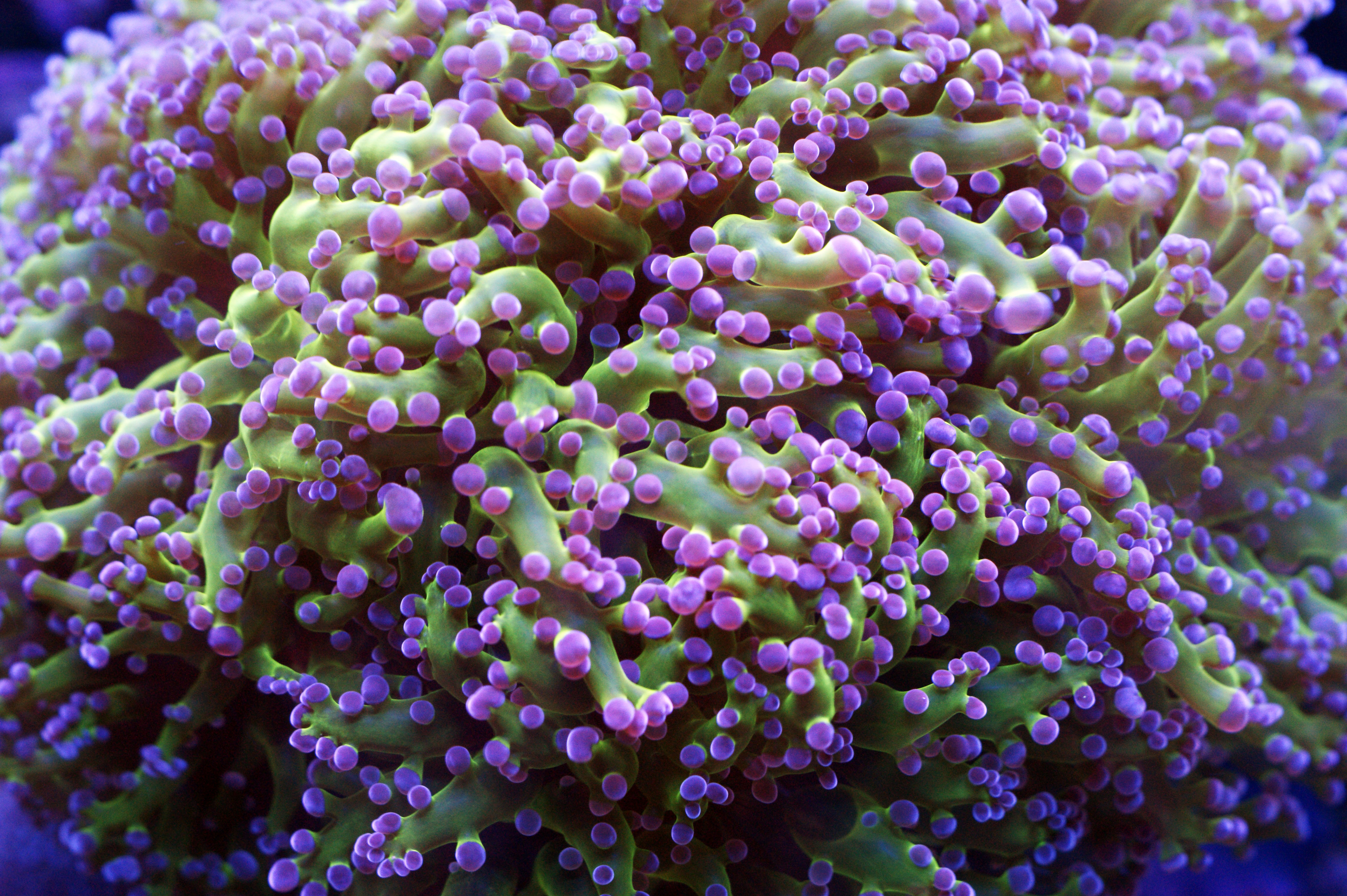

Conservation status
- Least Concern (IUCN 3.1)

Scientific classification
- Kingdom: Animalia
- Phylum: Cnidaria
- Subphylum: Anthozoa
- Class: Hexacorallia
- Order: Scleractinia
- Family: Euphylliidae
- Genus: Fimbriaphyllia
- Species: F. divisa

Binomial name
- Fimbriaphyllia divisa (Veron & Pichon, 1980)

Synonyms
- Euphyllia (Fimbriaphyllia) divisa Veron & Pichon, 1980; Euphyllia divisa Veron & Pichon, 1980

= Fimbriaphyllia divisa =

Frogspawn coral

Species of coral

Fimbriaphyllia divisa, commonly known as frogspawn coral, is a large-polyped stony coral native to the Indo-Pacific islands. It is a commonly kept species in the marine aquarium hobby. The related coral Fimbriaphyllia paradivisa is frequently misidentified as frogspawn leading to some confusion. Fimbriaphyllia divisa has a corallite skeleton with a flabello-meandroid "wall" structure whereas Fimbriaphyllia paradivisa has a tree-like branching structure with separate corallites.

== Distribution and habitat ==
It is native to the Indo-Pacific, Australia, Southeast Asia, the Ryukyu Islands and East China Sea, the Solomon Islands, Fiji, and Palau
