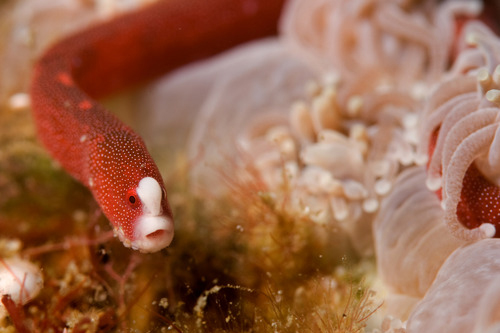

Conservation status
- Least Concern (IUCN 3.1)

Scientific classification
- Kingdom: Animalia
- Phylum: Chordata
- Class: Actinopterygii
- Order: Syngnathiformes
- Family: Syngnathidae
- Genus: Bulbonaricus
- Species: B. brauni

Binomial name
- Bulbonaricus brauni Dawson & Allen, 1978

Synonyms
- Enchelyocampus brauni Dawson & Allen, 1978

= Bulbonaricus brauni =

Braun's pughead pipefish

Species of fish

Bulbonaricus brauni (Braun's pughead pipefish) is a species of marine fish of the family Syngnathidae. It is found in the Eastern Indian Ocean, from Indonesia to Western Australia, and off the Ryukyu Islands of Japan. It lives among coral reefs at depths of 1-10m, where it commensul on Galaxea coral. It can grow to lengths of 5.5 cm. This species is ovoviviparous, with the males carrying eggs in a brood pouch until they hatch. The specific name honours "the collector" Mr. J. Braun who brought the living holotype to the Western Australia Museum.
