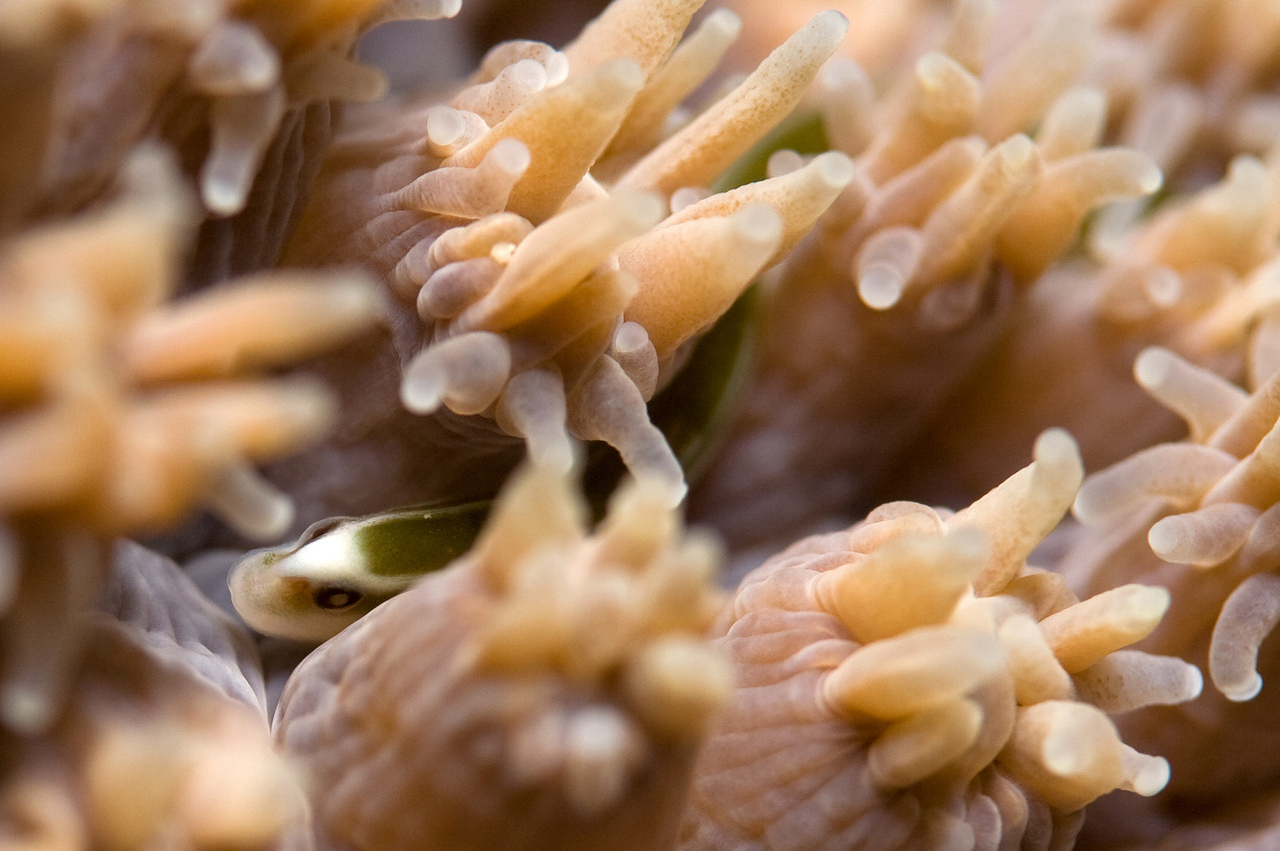

Conservation status
- Least Concern (IUCN 3.1)

Scientific classification
- Kingdom: Animalia
- Phylum: Chordata
- Class: Actinopterygii
- Order: Syngnathiformes
- Family: Syngnathidae
- Genus: Bulbonaricus
- Species: B. davaoensis

Binomial name
- Bulbonaricus davaoensis Herald, 1953

Synonyms
- Ichthyocampus davaoensis Herald, 1953

= Bulbonaricus davaoensis =

Davao pughead pipefish

Species of fish

Bulbanaricus davaoensis (Davao pughead pipefish) is a marine fish of the family Syngnathidae. It is found in the western Indian Ocean (coast of Kenya), the western Pacific Ocean from the Philippines to Fiji, and from Japan to the Great Barrier Reef, in Australia. Planktonic juveniles are found in the upper 200m of 610-7120m deep waters. The adult stage of this species is found among coral reefs to depths of 8m, and can grow to lengths of 4.3 cm. It is ovoviviparous, with the males carrying eggs in brood pouches until they are ready to hatch. It is a small secretive species which prefers to live among the galaxy coral Galaxea fascicularis.
