= Pineapple coral =

Pineapple coral may refer to two different species of corals:

- Blastomussa merleti, found in the Indo-Pacific Ocean area
- Dichocoenia stokesii, found in the Caribbean Sea and the western Atlantic Ocean
