= Gyrosmilia =

Conservation status
- Least Concern (IUCN 3.1)

Scientific classification
- Kingdom: Animalia
- Phylum: Cnidaria
- Subphylum: Anthozoa
- Class: Hexacorallia
- Order: Scleractinia
- Family: Euphylliidae
- Genus: Gyrosmilia; Milne-Edwards & Haime, 1851
- Species: G. interrupta

Binomial name
- Gyrosmilia interrupta (Ehrenberg, 1834)

Genus of corals

Gyrosmilia is a monotypic genus of large polyp stony coral. It is represented by a single species, Gyrosmilia interrupta. It was first described by Christian Gottfried Ehrenberg in 1834 as Manicina interrupta.

== Description ==
It is known to have a "distinctive uniform greenish grey-brown" color. Colonies are either submassive humps or laminar in shape with free margins up to 0.5 meters (1.6 feet) wide. Gyrosmilia interrupts has tentacles that extend only at night.

== Distribution and habitat ==
It can be found in scattered pockets throughout eastern African islands and coastline such as Madagascar, Eritrea, the Aldabran atoll, Réunion, Kenya, Mozambique, Mauritius, South Africa, and parts of the Red Sea in uncommon abundance.

It prefers shallow coral reefs that are protected from strong surface wave action.
