= Aureisphaera salina =

Scientific classification
- Domain: Bacteria
- Kingdom: Pseudomonadati
- Phylum: Bacteroidota
- Class: Flavobacteriia
- Order: Flavobacteriales
- Family: Flavobacteriaceae
- Genus: Aureisphaera
- Species: A. salina

Binomial name
- Aureisphaera salina Yoon et al. 2016

Type strain
- A6D-50

Species of bacterium

Aureisphaera salina is a Gram-negative, aerobic, chemoheterotrophic, rod-shaped and non-motile bacterium from the genus of Aureisphaera which has been isolated from an ascidian from the Kohama Island.
