= Simplastrea =

Conservation status
- Data Deficient (IUCN 3.1)

Scientific classification
- Kingdom: Animalia
- Phylum: Cnidaria
- Subphylum: Anthozoa
- Class: Hexacorallia
- Order: Scleractinia
- Family: Euphylliidae
- Genus: Simplastrea; Umbgrove, 1939
- Species: S. vesicularis

Binomial name
- Simplastrea vesicularis (Umbgrove, 1939)

Genus of corals

Simplastrea is a monotypic genus of large polyp stony coral from the Indian Ocean. It is represented by a single species, Simplastrea vesicularis.

== Description ==
Colonies of Simplastrea vesicularis are flat and encrusting with circular corallites that are spaced evenly by beaded coenosteum. It has thin walls, well-developed septae that are thin and straight with inner margins forming a columella tangle. The entire surface of Simplastrea vesicularis is covered in small tentacles displaying slight extension.

== Distribution and habitat ==
It can be found throughout the Indian Ocean and Indo-Pacific in the shallow waters of Papua New Guinea and Indonesia where it encrusts rock surfaces of coral reefs.
