= Bulbonaricus brucei =

Conservation status
- Data Deficient (IUCN 3.1)

Scientific classification
- Kingdom: Animalia
- Phylum: Chordata
- Class: Actinopterygii
- Order: Syngnathiformes
- Family: Syngnathidae
- Genus: Bulbonaricus
- Species: B. brucei

Binomial name
- Bulbonaricus brucei Dawson, 1984

Species of fish

Bulbonaricus brucei is a species of marine fish of the family Syngnathidae. It is known only for individuals found in the western Indian Ocean, at Pangani, Maziwi Island, and Tanzania. Although little is known of this species, the known specimens were collected near coral at depths of 1m, and were a maximum length of 4.5 cm. It is ovoviviparous, with males carrying eggs in brood pouches until they hatch. The specific name honours the British carcinologist Dr. Alexander (Sandy) James Bruce (born 1929).
