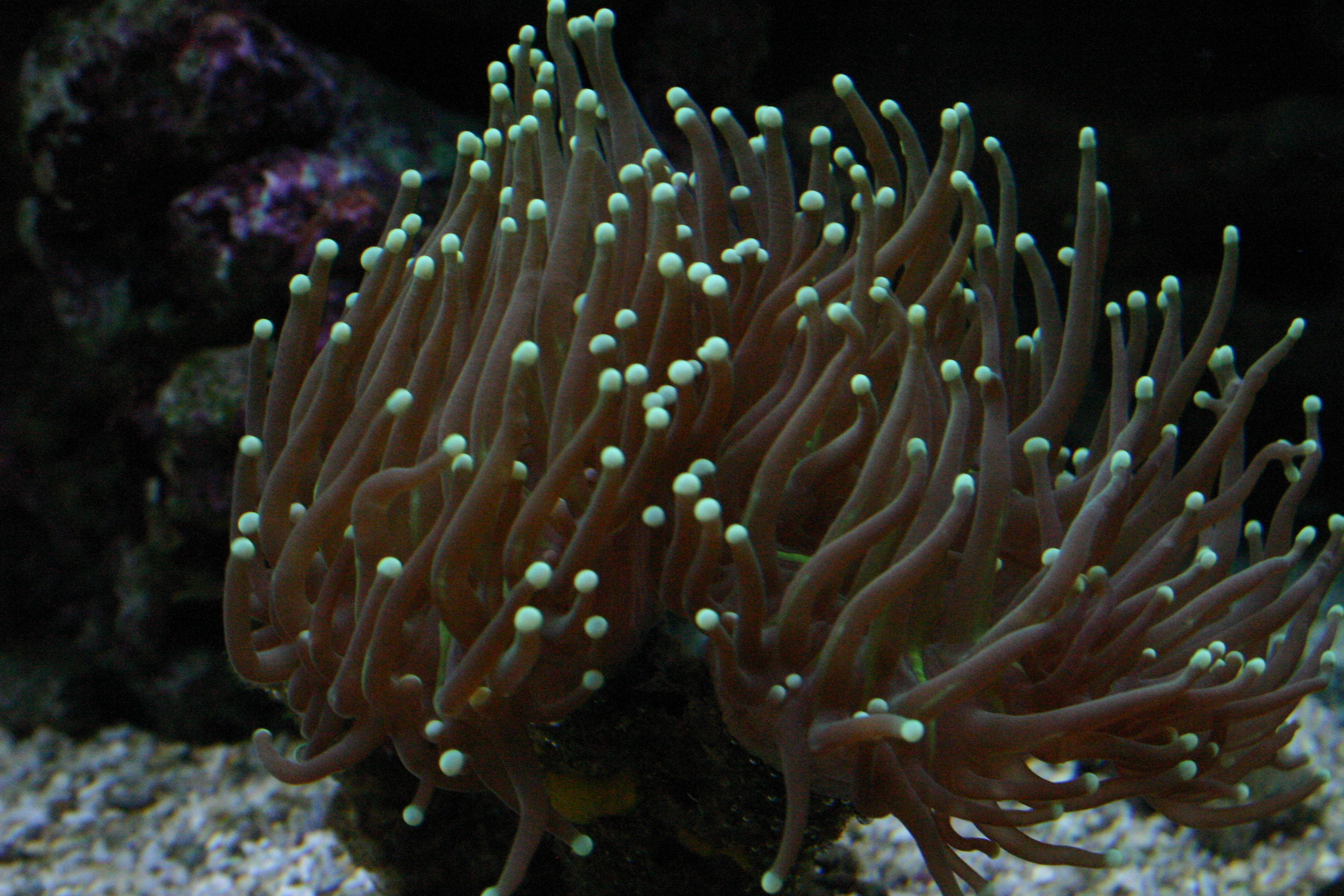

Conservation status
- Least Concern (IUCN 3.1)

Scientific classification
- Kingdom: Animalia
- Phylum: Cnidaria
- Subphylum: Anthozoa
- Class: Hexacorallia
- Order: Scleractinia
- Family: Euphylliidae
- Genus: Euphyllia
- Species: E. glabrescens

Binomial name
- Euphyllia glabrescens Chamisso & Eysenhardt, 1821

Synonyms
- List: Caryophyllia angulosa Quoy & Gaimard, 1824; Caryophyllia glabrescens Chamisso & Eysenhardt, 1821; Catalaphyllia okinawaensis Eguchi & Shirai, 1977; Euphyllia (Euphyllia) glabrescens (Chamisso & Eysenhardt, 1821); Euphyllia costulata (Milne Edwards & Haime, 1849); Euphyllia gaimardi (Milne Edwards & Haime, 1849); Euphyllia laxa Gravier, 1910; Euphyllia rugosa Dana, 1846; Euphyllia striata (Milne Edwards & Haime, 1849); Euphyllia turgida Dana, 1846; Leptosmilia costulata Milne Edwards & Haime, 1849; Leptosmilia gaimardi Milne Edwards & Haime, 1849; Leptosmilia glabrescens (Chamisso & Eysenhardt, 1821); Leptosmilia rugosa (Dana, 1846); Leptosmilia striata Milne Edwards & Haime, 1849; Lobophyllia glabrescens (Chamisso & Eysenhardt, 1821)

= Euphyllia glabrescens =

Species of coral

Euphyllia glabrescens is a species of large-polyped stony coral belonging to the family Euphylliidae. Its common name is the torch coral due to its long sweeper tentacles tipped with potent cnidocytes. It is a commonly kept species in the marine aquarium hobby, particularly specimens from Indonesia and Fiji, who fulfilled annual export quotas of 28,000 and 6,000 pieces, respectively, in 2005.

== Description ==
Euphyllia glabrescens is a colonial coral with a phaceloid formation of corallites 20–30 millimeters (0.79–1.18 inches) in diameter and spaced 15–30 millimeters (0.59–1.18 inches) apart. Walls are thin, with sharp edges. Polyps have large tubular tentacles with knob-like tips. It can be a number of colors, and is often bicolored with contrasting tentacles and polyp tips.

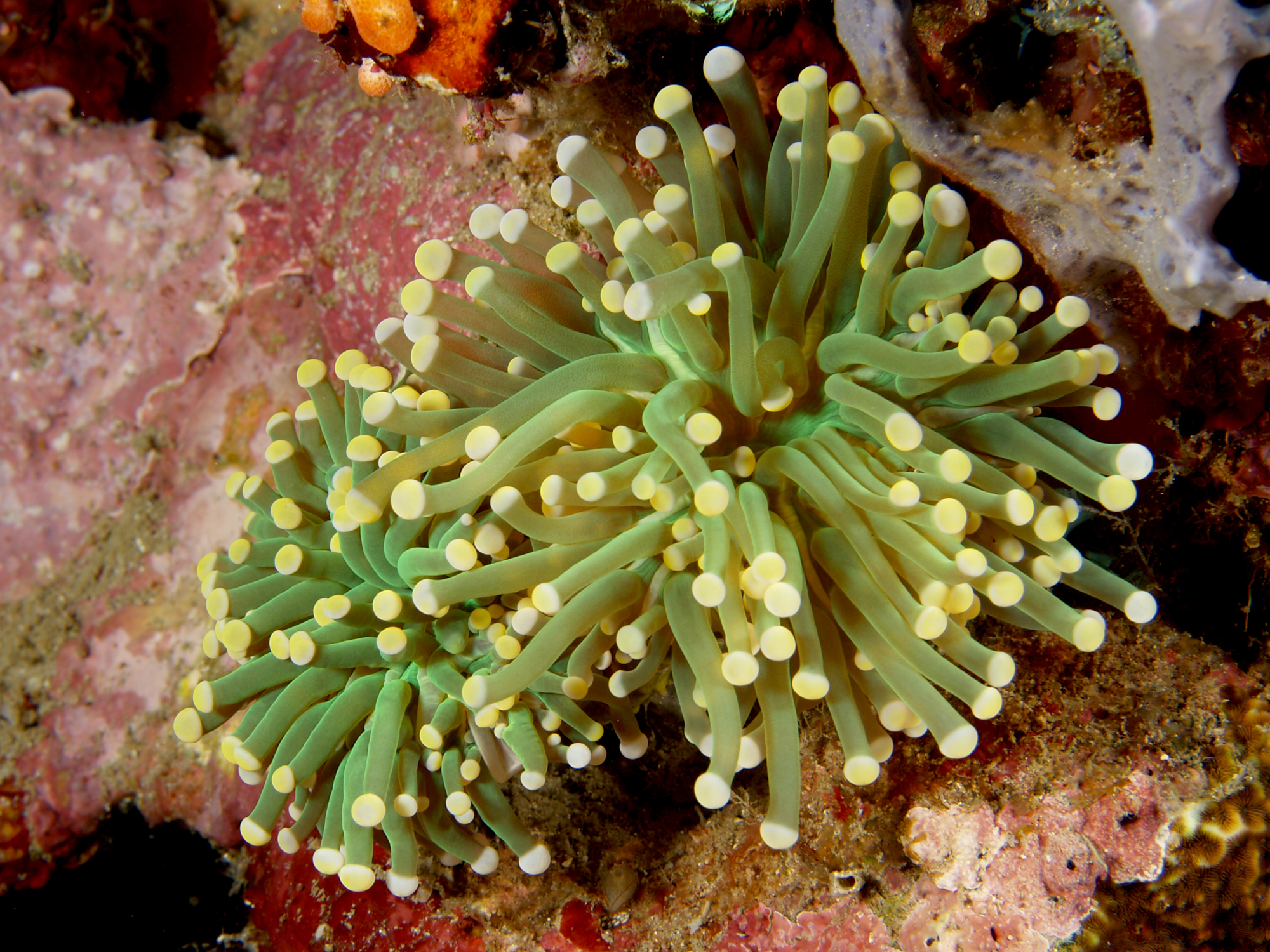
Green, yellow tipped

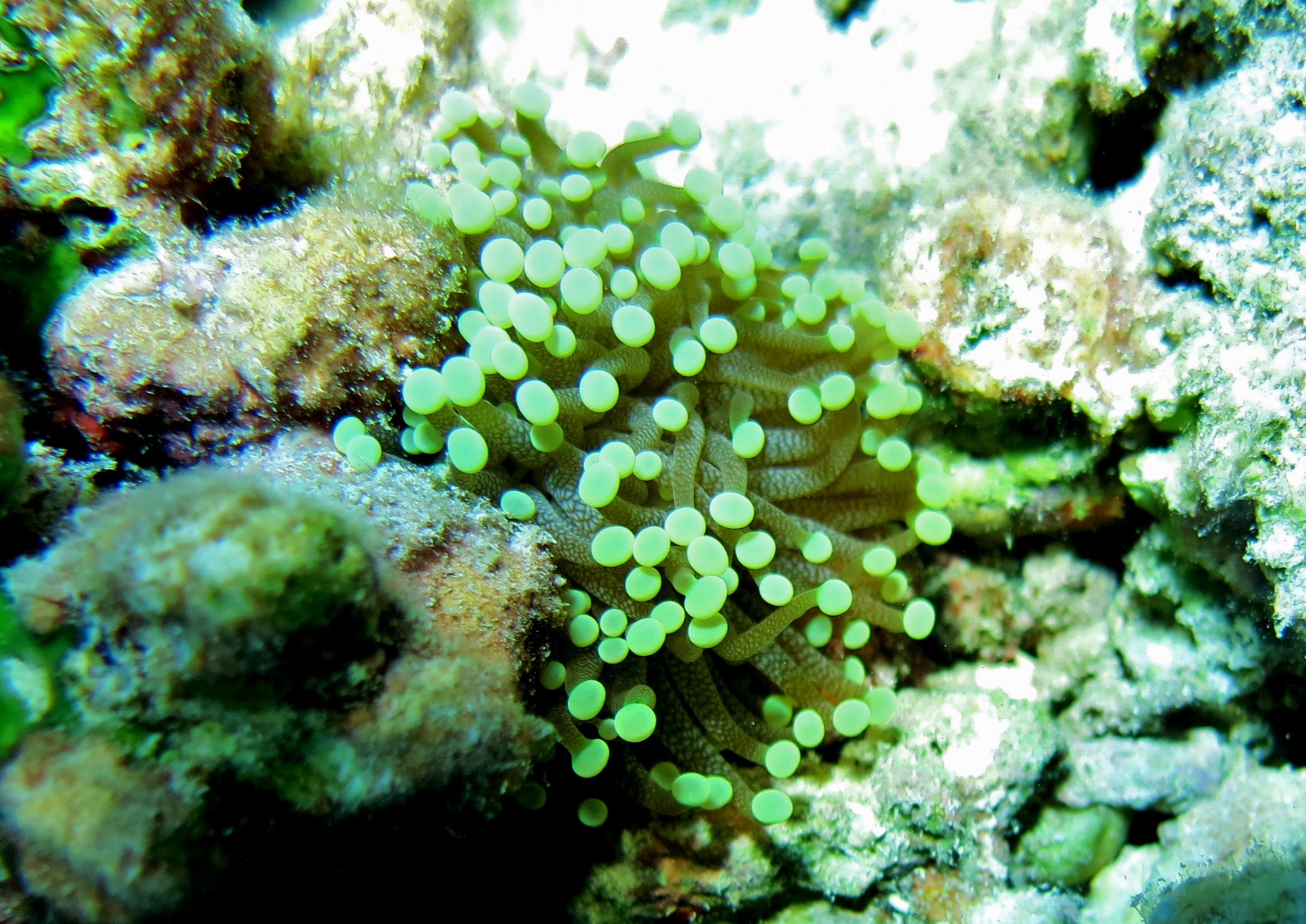
Beige, green tipped

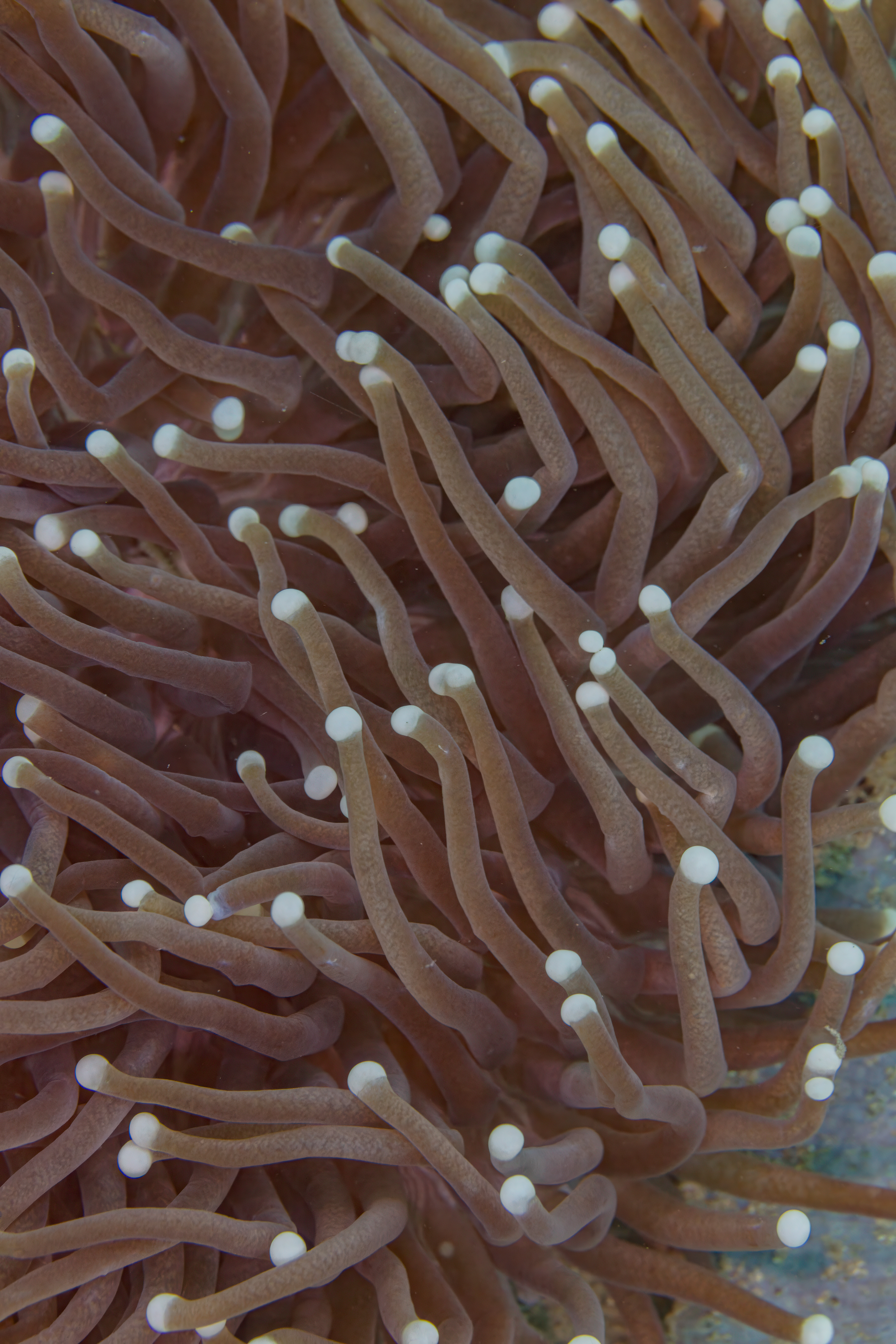
Beige, white tipped

== Distribution and habitat ==
This is a widely distributed species, rare to the Red Sea and the Gulf of Aden, while uncommon through the northern Indian Ocean, the Persian Gulf, the central Indo-Pacific, Australia, Southeast Asia, southern Japan and the East China Sea, Micronesia, and American Samoa.

Euphyllia glabrescens can be founds in depths of 1 to 35 meters (3.3 to 114.8 ft) in a wide range of reef environments
