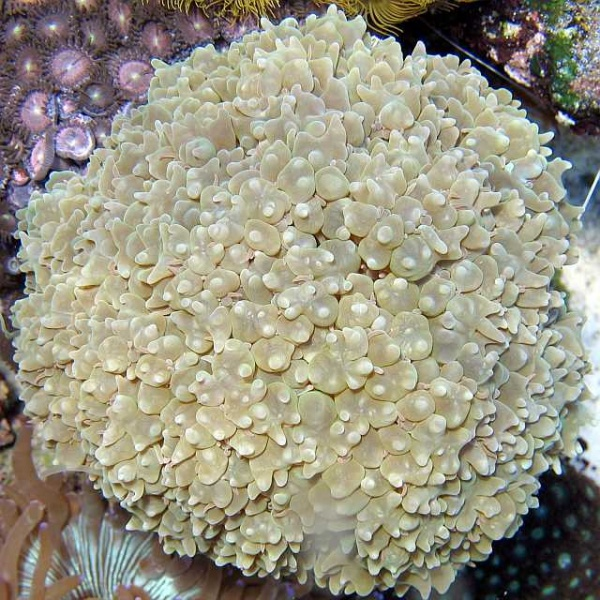
- Physogyra lichtensteini

Scientific classification
- Domain: Eukaryota
- Kingdom: Animalia
- Phylum: Cnidaria
- Subphylum: Anthozoa
- Class: Hexacorallia
- Order: Scleractinia
- Family: Plerogyridae
- Genus: Physogyra; Quelch, 1884

= Physogyra =

Genus of corals

Physogyra is a genus of cnidarians belonging to the family Plerogyridae.

The species of this genus are found in Indian and Pacific Ocean.

Species:

- Physogyra astraeiformis Umbgrove, 1940
- Physogyra exerta Nemenzo & Ferraris, 1982
- Physogyra gravieri Vaughan, 1907
- Physogyra lichtensteini (Milne Edwards & Haime, 1851)
- Physogyra somaliensis Vaughan, 1907
