= Euphyllia baliensis =

Conservation status
- Endangered (IUCN 3.1)

Scientific classification
- Kingdom: Animalia
- Phylum: Cnidaria
- Subphylum: Anthozoa
- Class: Hexacorallia
- Order: Scleractinia
- Family: Euphylliidae
- Genus: Euphyllia
- Species: E. baliensis

Binomial name
- Euphyllia baliensis Devantier & Erdman, 2012

Species of coral

Euphyllia baliensis, commonly known as Bubble coral, is a species of large-polyped stony coral belonging to the family Euphylliidae.

== Description ==
It is best distinguished from other members of the genus Euphyllia by its "comparatively very small corallites (averaging 3 mm diameter) and much shorter, thinner, lightly calcified branches."

== Distribution & habitat ==
It can be found at depths of 27 to 37 meters off the central eastern coast of Bali, Indonesia. The species has not been reported from any other locality.
