= Aureisphaera =

Scientific classification
- Domain: Bacteria
- Kingdom: Pseudomonadati
- Phylum: Bacteroidota
- Class: Flavobacteriia
- Order: Flavobacteriales
- Family: Flavobacteriaceae
- Genus: Aureisphaera; Yoon et al. 2015

Type species
- Aureisphaera galaxeae

Species
- A. galaxeae A. salina

Genus of bacteria

Aureisphaera is a genus of gram-negative bacteria from the family of Flavobacteriaceae.
