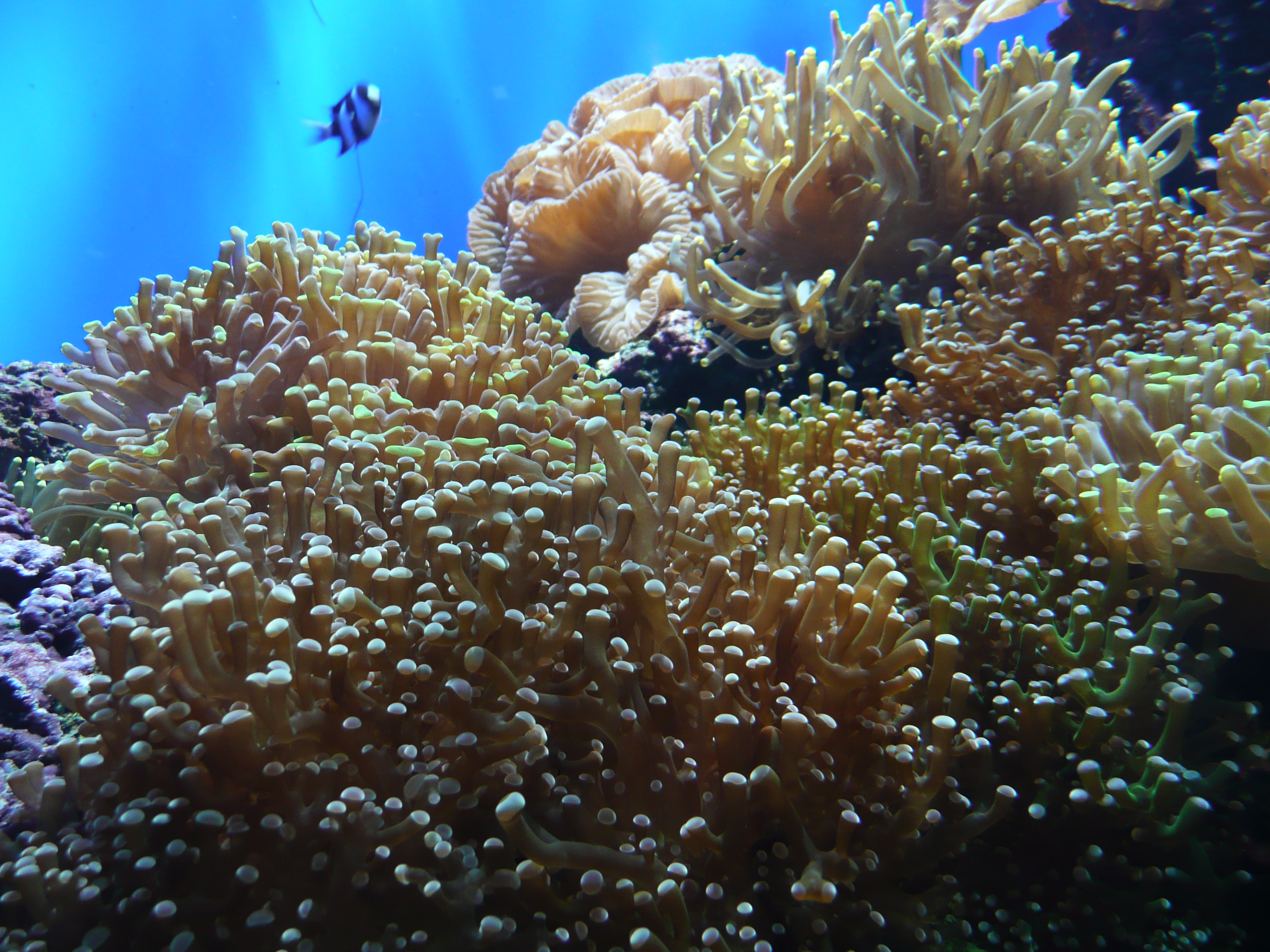
- Several Euphyllia species

Scientific classification
- Kingdom: Animalia
- Phylum: Cnidaria
- Subphylum: Anthozoa
- Class: Hexacorallia
- Order: Scleractinia
- Family: Euphylliidae
- Genus: Euphyllia; Dana, 1846

Species
- See text

Synonyms
- List: Botryphyllia Shirai, 1980; Euphyllia (Euphyllia) Dana, 1846; Euphyllia (Fimbriaphyllia) Veron & Pichon, 1980; Fimbriaphyllia Veron & Pichon, 1980; Leptosmilia Milne Edwards & Haime, 1848

= Euphyllia =

Genus of corals

Euphyllia is a genus of large-polyped stony coral. Several species are commonly found in marine aquariums. The genus includes the following species:

- Euphyllia baliensis Turak, Devantier & Erdman, 2012 – bubble coral
- Euphyllia cristata Chevalier, 1971 – grape coral
- Euphyllia glabrescens (Chamisso & Eysenhardt, 1821) – torch coral
- Euphyllia paraglabrescens Veron, 1990

The former subgenus Fimbriaphyllia was elevated to full genus status, and the 5 species were assigned to it were moved accordingly.
