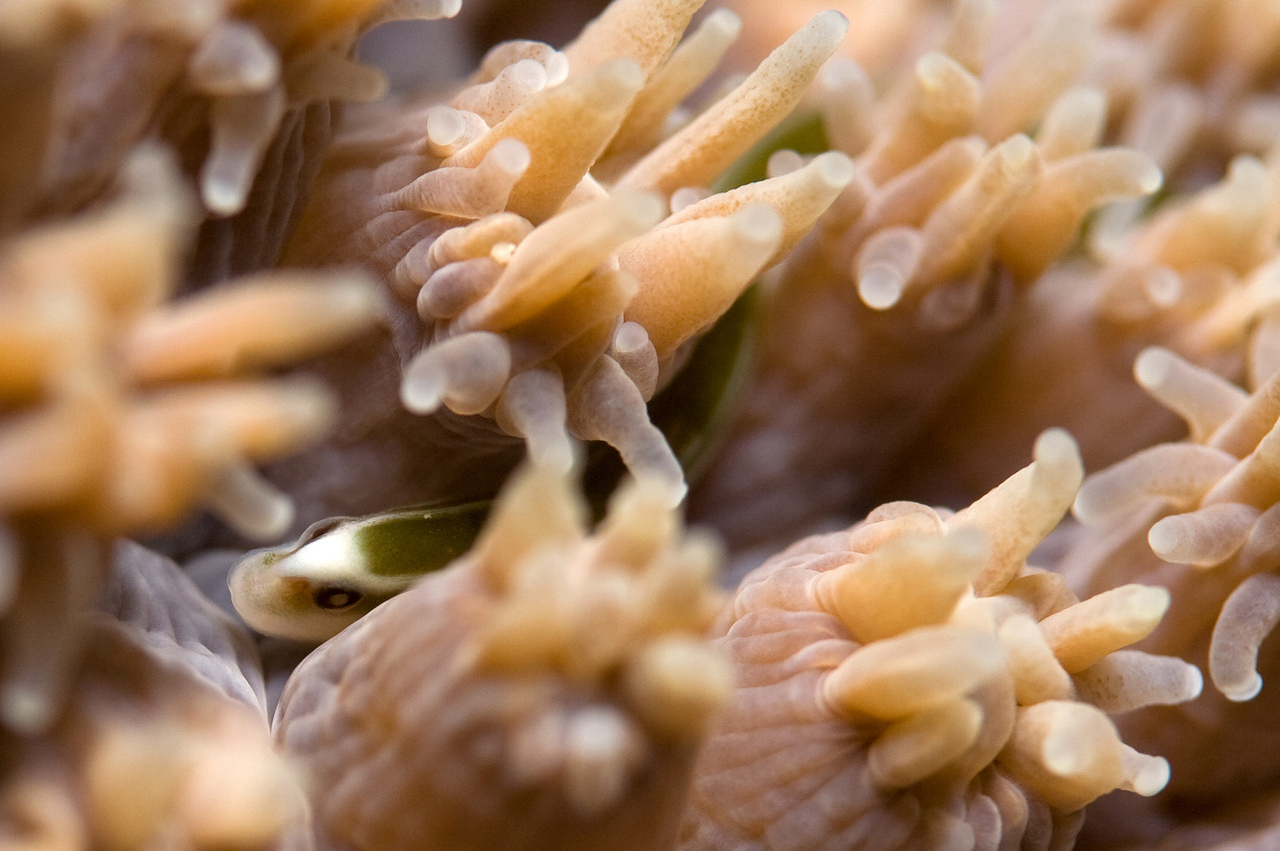
- Bulbonaricus davaoensis

Scientific classification
- Kingdom: Animalia
- Phylum: Chordata
- Class: Actinopterygii
- Order: Syngnathiformes
- Family: Syngnathidae
- Subfamily: Syngnathinae
- Genus: Bulbonaricus; Herald, 1953

Type species
- Ichthyocampus davaoensis Herald 1953

Synonyms
- Enchelyocampus Dawson & Allen, 1978

= Bulbonaricus =

Genus of fishes

Bulbonaricus is a genus of pipefishes native to the Indian and Pacific Oceans.

== Species ==
There are currently three recognized species in this genus:

- Bulbonaricus brauni (C. E. Dawson & G. R. Allen, 1978) (Pugheaded pipefish)
- Bulbonaricus brucei C. E. Dawson, 1984
- Bulbonaricus davaoensis (Herald, 1953) (Davao pughead pipefish)
