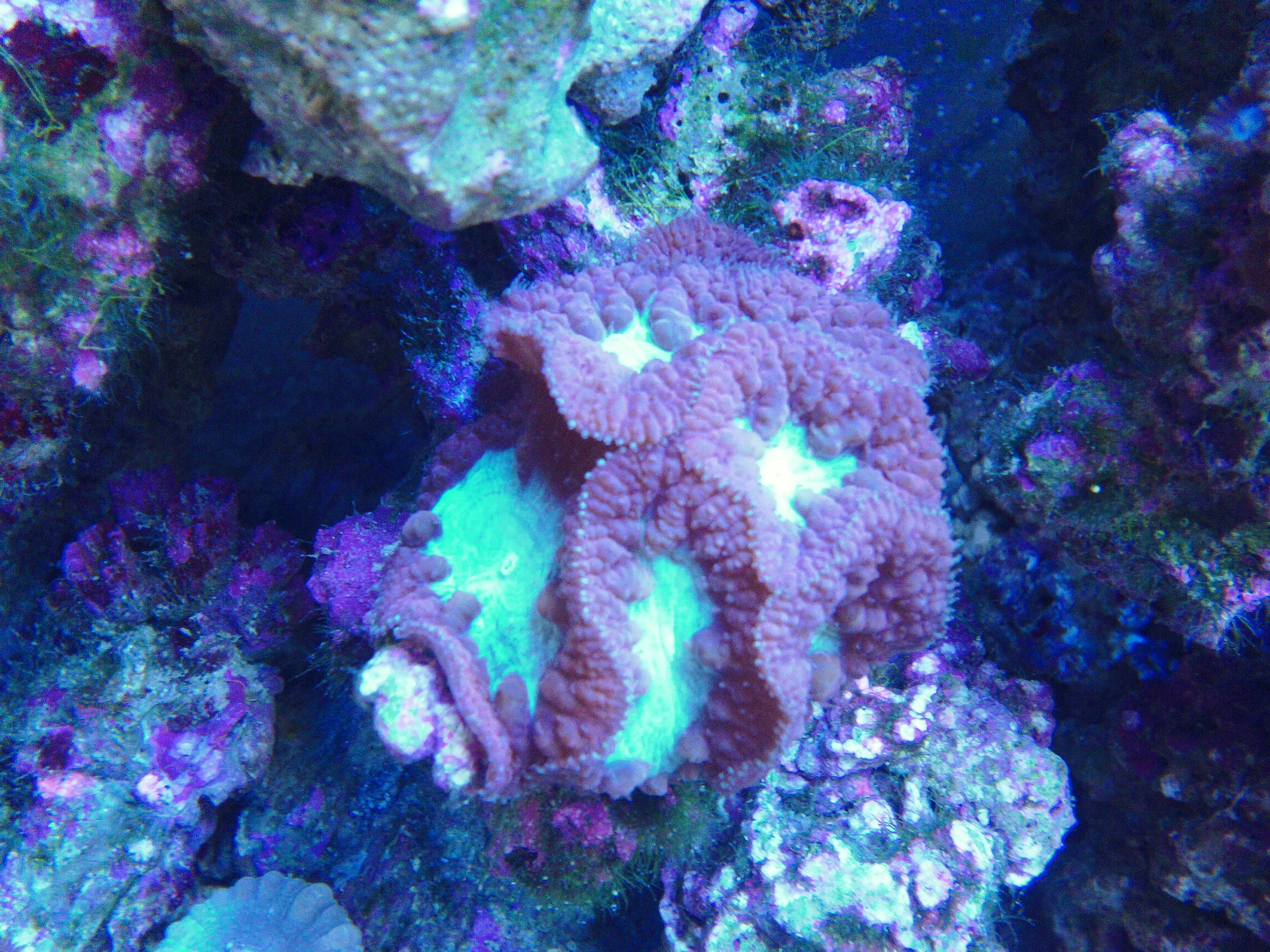
- Blastomussa wellsi

Scientific classification
- Domain: Eukaryota
- Kingdom: Animalia
- Phylum: Cnidaria
- Class: Hexacorallia
- Order: Scleractinia
- Family: Plerogyridae
- Genus: Blastomussa; Wells, 1968

Species
- See text

Synonyms
- Ceriomorpha Head, 1978; Parasimplastrea Sheppard & Sheppard, 1991

= Blastomussa =

Genus of corals

Blastomussa is a genus of large polyp stony corals belonging to the family Plerogyridae. Members of this genus are sometimes found in reef aquariums.

== Species ==
The World Register of Marine Species recognises the following species:

- Blastomussa loyae Head, 1978
- Blastomussa merleti (Wells, 1961)
- Blastomussa omanensis (Sheppard & Sheppard, 1991)
- Blastomussa simplicitexta (Umbgrove, 1942) †
- Blastomussa vivida Benzoni, Arrigoni & Hoeksema, 2014
- Blastomussa wellsi Wijsman-Best, 1973
