= Fimbriaphyllia =

- Fimbriaphyllia yaeyamaensis under special lighting at London Zoo

Scientific classification
- Kingdom: Animalia
- Phylum: Cnidaria
- Subphylum: Anthozoa
- Class: Hexacorallia
- Order: Scleractinia
- Family: Euphylliidae
- Genus: Fimbriaphyllia; Veron & Pichon, 1980

Synonyms
- Botryophyllia Shirai, 1980; Botryphyllia Shirai, 1980; Euphyllia (Fimbriaphyllia) Veron & Pichon, 1980

Genus of corals

Fimbriaphyllia is a genus of large-polyped stony coral. It was previously regarded as a subgenus of Euphyllia.

There are 5 species assigned to this genus:

- Fimbriaphyllia ancora (Veron & Pichon, 1980)
- Fimbriaphyllia divisa (Veron & Pichon, 1980)
- Fimbriaphyllia paraancora (Veron, 1990)
- Fimbriaphyllia paradivisa (Veron, 1990)
- Fimbriaphyllia yaeyamaensis (Shirai, 1980)
