= Montigyra =

Conservation status
- Data Deficient (IUCN 3.1)

Scientific classification
- Kingdom: Animalia
- Phylum: Cnidaria
- Subphylum: Anthozoa
- Class: Hexacorallia
- Order: Scleractinia
- Family: Euphylliidae
- Genus: Montigyra; Matthai, 1928
- Species: M. kenti

Binomial name
- Montigyra kenti (Matthai, 1928)

Genus of corals

Montigyra is a monotypic genus of stony coral which is a type of coral that lives on the seabed and builds a hard skeleton. It is represented by a single species, Montigyra kenti. Like all coral, this one is composed of animals called polyps, and the polyps of this species are large compared to those of other coral.

== Description ==
It has a hemispherical and submeandroid skeleton with groups of septa fused into monticules or hydnophores, a trait typically attributed to Hydnophora. Its septae are thin and compact.

== Distribution & habitat ==
Its habitat is not recorded. The genus Montigyra and species Montigyra kenti are both described from a single specimen found in northwest Australia. It was collected in turbid water.
