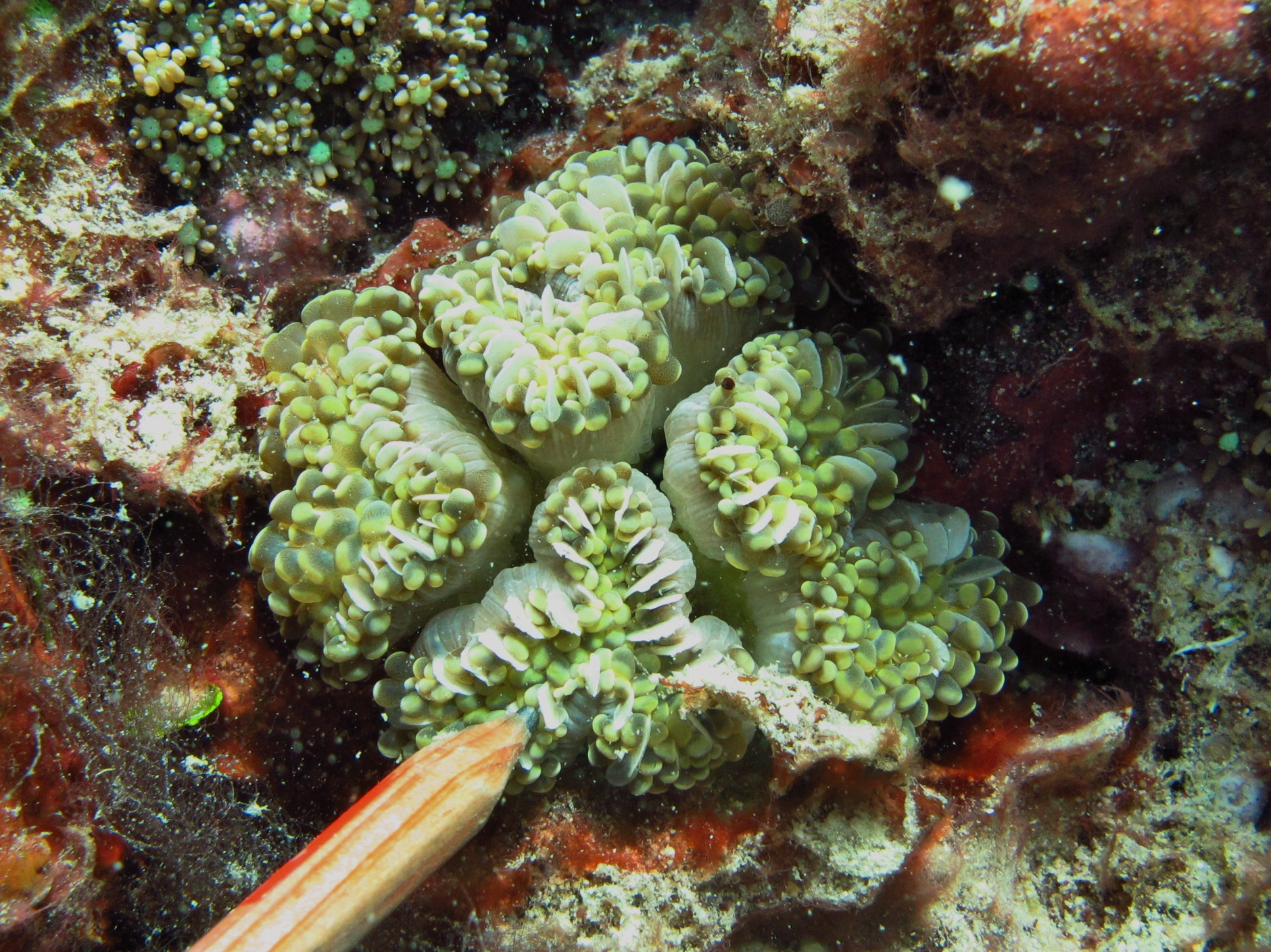

Conservation status
- Least Concern (IUCN 3.1)

Scientific classification
- Kingdom: Animalia
- Phylum: Cnidaria
- Subphylum: Anthozoa
- Class: Hexacorallia
- Order: Scleractinia
- Family: Euphylliidae
- Genus: Euphyllia
- Species: E. cristata

Binomial name
- Euphyllia cristata Chevalier, 1971

= Euphyllia cristata =

Species of coral

Euphyllia cristata is commonly called Grape coral. E. cristata is a kind of stony or hard coral in the family Euphylliidae; it also belongs to the genus Euphyllia in the order of Scleractinia. E. cristata has a wide range of distribution throughout the tropical waters of the Indo-West Pacific area with a large presence in Indonesia. However, despite this large range of distribution, E. cristata has a slightly lower abundance compared to other species, making them a little more uncommon to find. They are typically found in shallow waters from 1–35 meters deep.

== Taxonomy ==
Euphyllia cristata was first documented by Chevalier in 1971. E. cristata is a Cnidaria of the class Anthozoa and of the order of Scleractinia. Scleractinia are hard corals. E. cristata live in small sized phaceloid colonies, which is a particular type of spatial formation and organisation, where corallites are elongate, distinctive tube-like, and between 20 and 40 millimetres (1.6 in) diameter.

== Distribution and Abundance ==
E. cristata has a wide range of distribution in the Indo-Western Pacific. Their range of distribution also includes the Coral Triangle and the Great Barrier Reef. Even though E. cristata’s distribution is diverse, it is absent from the Red Sea. E. cristata is found on hard substrates. In addition, they are found in a depth of 1–35 meters below the surface.

== Threats ==
The International Union for Conservation Nature and Natural Resources (IUCN) classified the Red List status of the E. cristata as vulnerable in 2008. In addition, many of the other Euphilids have been classified as threatened by the IUCN. There are many threats to the populations of E. cristata. As a result of E. cristata being a colorful stony coral with big polyps, it has been sought after for jewelry. E. cristata is also faced with having to adapt to changes in mean tide levels, changes in wave action, increases in water temperature, ocean acidification, fisheries, exposure to pollution, and erosion. These things increase the frequencies of bleaching and increase the susceptibility of the coral to disease.
