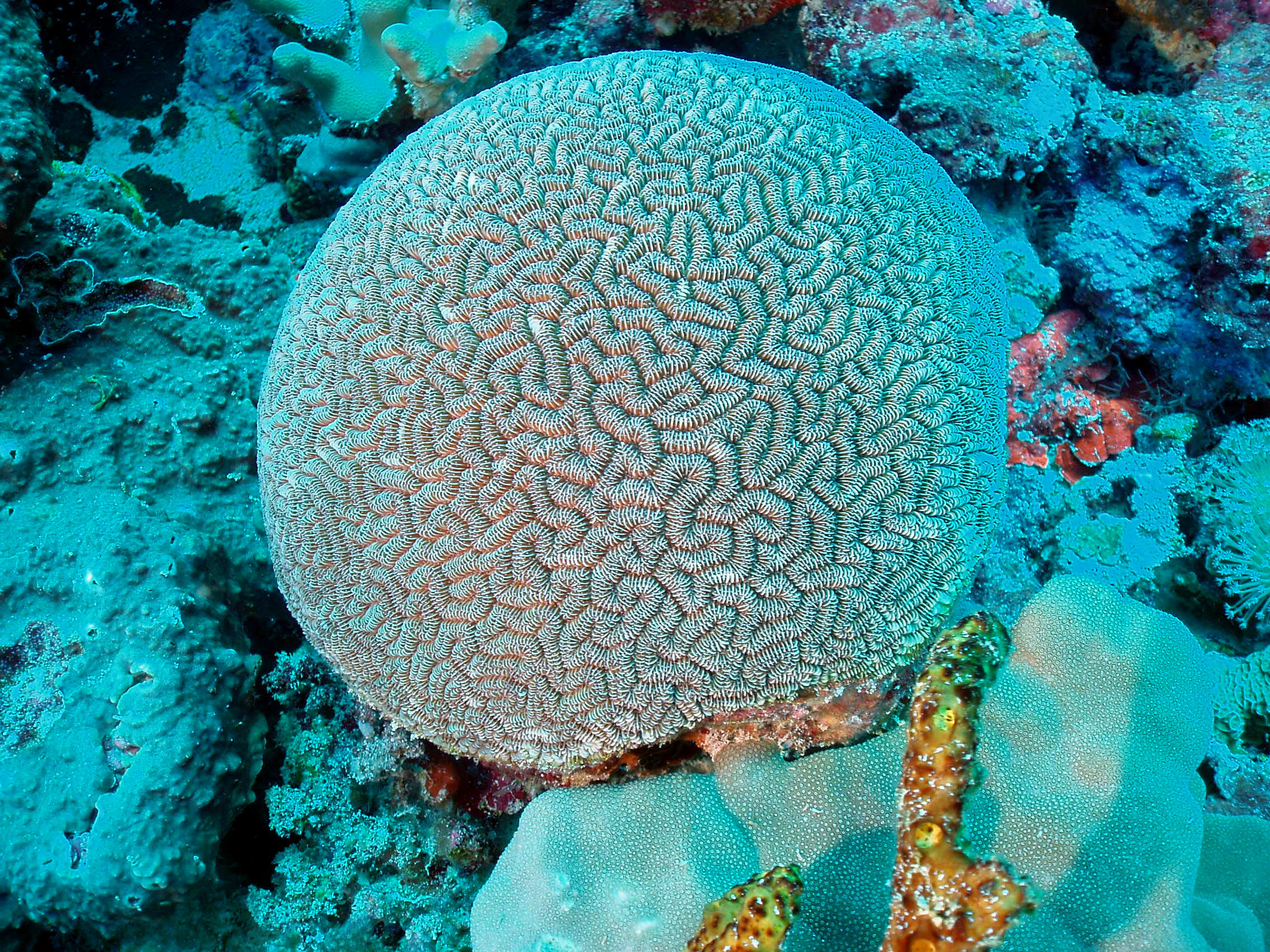
- Ctenella chagius

Conservation status
- Critically Endangered (IUCN 3.1)
- CITES Appendix II

Scientific classification
- Kingdom: Animalia
- Phylum: Cnidaria
- Subphylum: Anthozoa
- Class: Hexacorallia
- Order: Scleractinia
- Family: Euphylliidae
- Genus: Ctenella; Matthai, 1928
- Species: C. chagius

Binomial name
- Ctenella chagius Matthai, 1928

= Ctenella =

Genus of corals

Ctenella is a monotypic genus of stony coral in the family Euphylliidae. It is represented by a single species, Ctenella chagius. These corals are massive in size with meandering valleys between the calyces which have solid, non-porous walls and fine, evenly spaced, solid septae. They are found in the Indian Ocean being endemic to the Chagos Archipelago. It forms solid, smooth hemispherical domes.

== Description ==
Ctenella chagius is a massive, hemispherical, colonial coral with a fissured surface and brain-like appearance. The individual polyps that secrete the stony skeleton project from stony cups called corallites arranged in rows in long meandering valleys. The width between the solid ridges on either side is about 1.5 cm (0.6 in) with the valleys being about 1 cm (0.4 in) deep. The fine septa that radiate from the corallites are closely packed and evenly spaced, some continuing upwards and over the ridges. This coral is a pale brown colour and can grow to a metre (yard) in diameter. It is a zooxanthellate coral and has symbiotic unicellular dinoflagellate algae living within its tissues.

== Distribution ==
Ctenella chagius is found around the Chagos Islands. It is found in lagoons and on reef slopes at depths of up to 45 metres (148 ft).

== Status ==
Ctenella chagius is listed as being "critically endangered" in the IUCN Red List of Threatened Species. The size of its population is unknown but the reefs on which it lives are being degraded at a faster rate than it is likely to be able to establish new colonies. It is very susceptible to coral bleaching and coral diseases, both of which are on the increase as sea temperatures rise. There are also threats to the coral from human activities but the Chagos Islands are now part of the Chagos Marine Protected Area which should provide a measure of protection for this coral.
