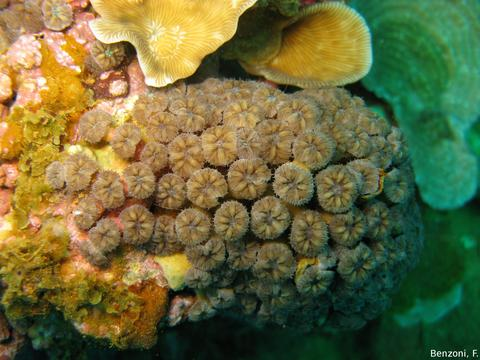
- In New Caledonia

Conservation status
- Least Concern (IUCN 3.1)

Scientific classification
- Kingdom: Animalia
- Phylum: Cnidaria
- Subphylum: Anthozoa
- Class: Hexacorallia
- Order: Scleractinia
- Family: Plerogyridae
- Genus: Blastomussa
- Species: B. merleti

Binomial name
- Blastomussa merleti (Wells, 1961)

Synonyms
- Bantamia merleti Wells, 1961; Blastomussa merletti (Wells, 1961) [lapsus]; Cladocora kabiraensis Eguchi, 1975

= Blastomussa merleti =

Species of coral

Blastomussa merleti, commonly known as pineapple coral, is a species of large polyp stony coral. It is unclear in which family the genus Blastomussa belongs. This coral is native to the west and central Indo-Pacific region and is sometimes used in reef aquaria.

== Description ==
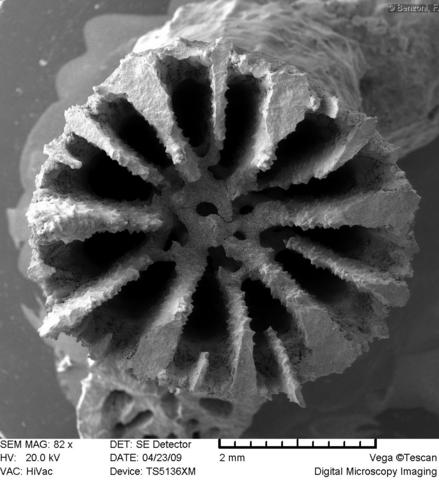
Detail of a corallite of Blastomussa merleti

Young colonies of this coral have each corallite extending out from a common, dome-shaped centre. However, over time these individual corallites become separated and the colony could be considered to be a group of cloned, solitary individuals. The corallites are less than 7 millimetres (0.3 in) in diameter. The septa have toothed margins and are arranged in two cycles, only the first of which reaches to the central columella. The polyps are only extended at night. This coral may be dark red, pink, orange, brown or dark grey, often with contrasting green oral discs.

== Distribution and habitat ==
Blastomussa merleti is native to the Indio-Pacific region. The Blastomussa merleti coexists in the Indo-Pacific region with other species in the same genus, B. wellsi and B. loyae. Its range extends from the Red Sea and the coast of East Africa, through the Indian Ocean, to northern and western Australia, Japan, the East China Sea and the islands of the oceanic West Pacific. It inhabits a range of reef habitats, including steep slopes and crevices, at depths down to about 50 metres (160 ft).

== Status ==
Blastomussa merleti is a moderately common species of coral with a widespread distribution. The population trend is unknown but it is probable that the number of mature colonies is decreasing as a result of destruction of its reef habitats. Its conservation status has been assessed as being of "least concern" by the International Union for Conservation of Nature.

== Use in aquaria ==
Because of its bright colours, this coral is sometimes kept in a reef aquarium, where it is said to be moderately easy to care for. As well as collecting food particles with their tentacles and obtaining energy from their symbiotic zooxanthellae, the polyps can extract organic carbon from the water.
