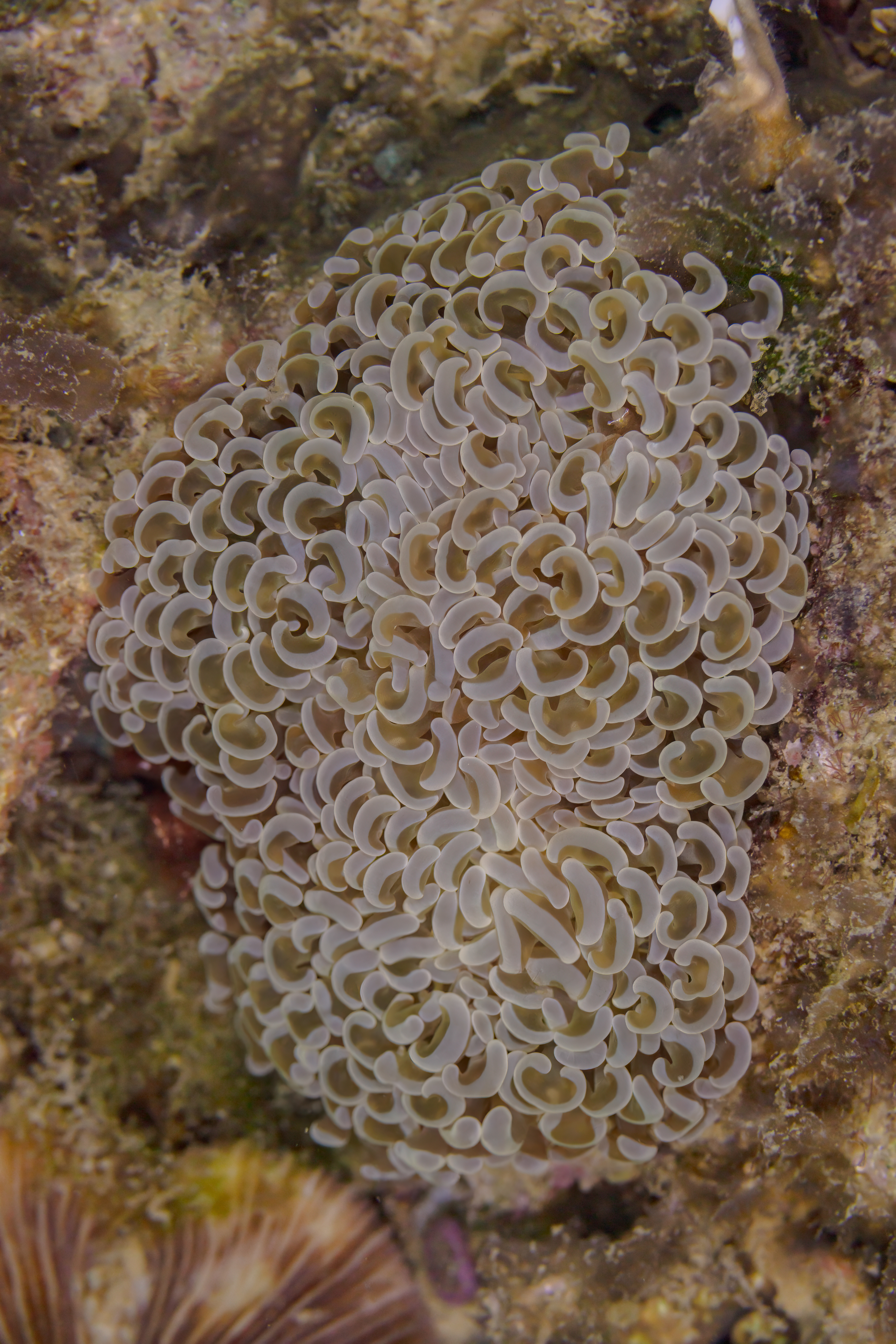

Conservation status
- Least Concern (IUCN 3.1)

Scientific classification
- Kingdom: Animalia
- Phylum: Cnidaria
- Subphylum: Anthozoa
- Class: Hexacorallia
- Order: Scleractinia
- Family: Euphylliidae
- Genus: Fimbriaphyllia
- Species: F. ancora

Binomial name
- Fimbriaphyllia ancora (Veron & Pichon, 1980)

Synonyms
- Euphyllia (Fimbriaphyllia) ancora Veron & Pichon, 1980; Euphyllia anacora Veron & Pichon, 1980; Euphyllia ancora Veron & Pichon, 1980; Fimbriaphyllia (Euphyllia) ancora (Veron & Pichon, 1980)

= Fimbriaphyllia ancora =

Species of coral

Fimbriaphyllia ancora is a species of hard coral in the family Euphylliidae. It is known by several common names, including anchor coral and hammer coral, or less frequently as sausage coral, ridge coral, or bubble honeycomb coral.

== Description ==
This type of madreporal colony is easy to identify because of its puffy tubular tentacles with T-shaped tips. The coral is blue-gray to orange in color, sometimes with green on the tentacles. It can demonstrate full or partial viral infection of green fluorescent protein, a trait highly sought for aquarium specimens. Colonies are flabelloid, phaceloid or flabello-meandroid. Walls are thin and soil. Columellae are mostly absent. Septa are exsert, smooth edged and solid. Tentacles are extended day and night and are large and fleshy. They vary in shape among species. Fimbriaphyllia ancora have a "T" or boomerang shape to them. Colonies are usually no more than a meter across, but at times can reach several meters. They are all symmetrically about a central axis and have a sac-like body cavity with only one opening, which serves as both mouth and anus. This opening is surrounded by tentacles which have stinging cells. The body wall, unlike that is any other group of animals except comb-jellies, consist of two cell layers, the ectodermis and gastrodermis, separated by a jelly-like layer, mesoglea.

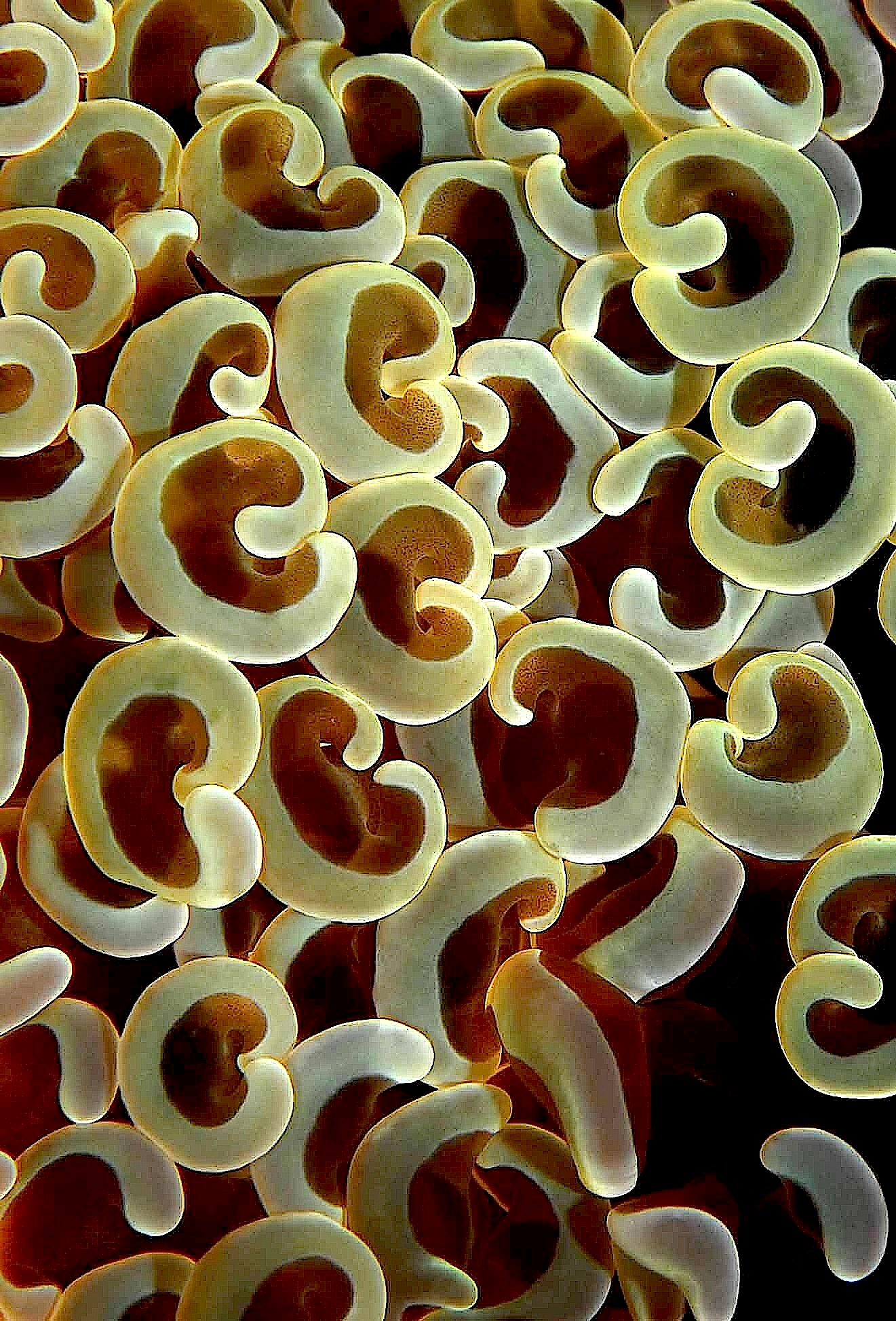
Gold

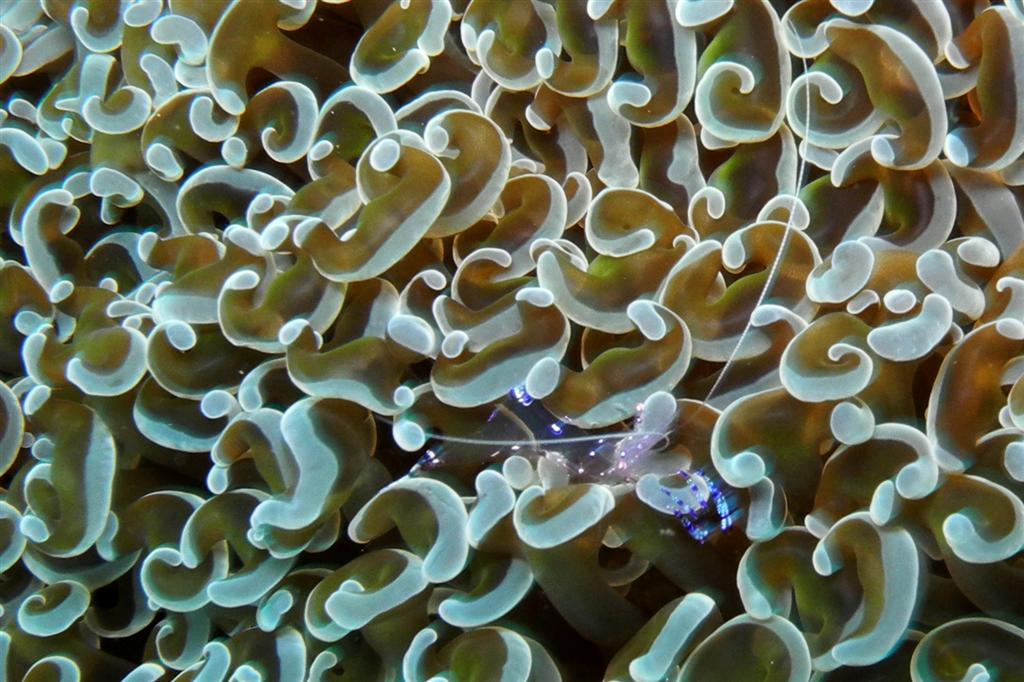
Green

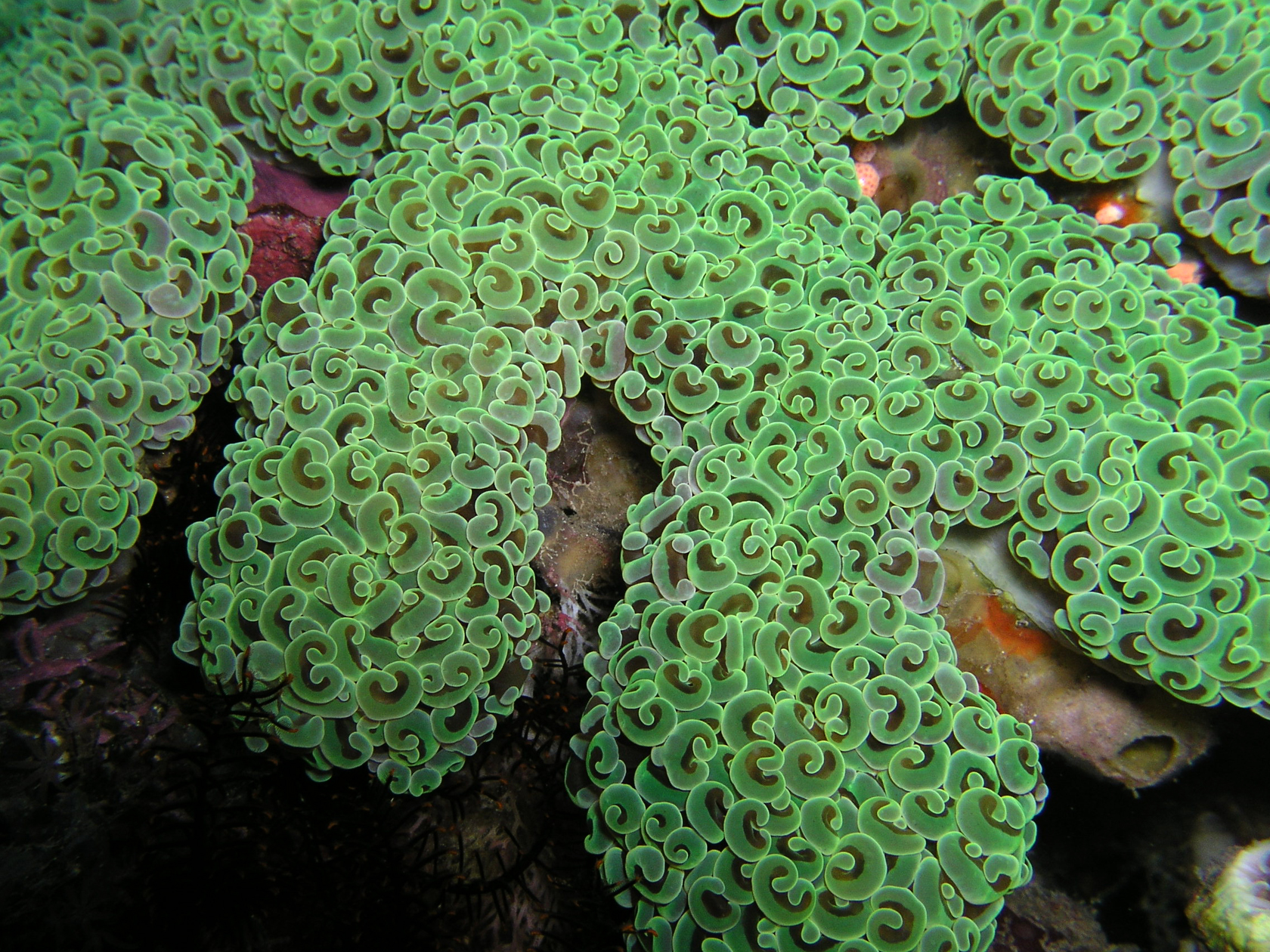
Neon green

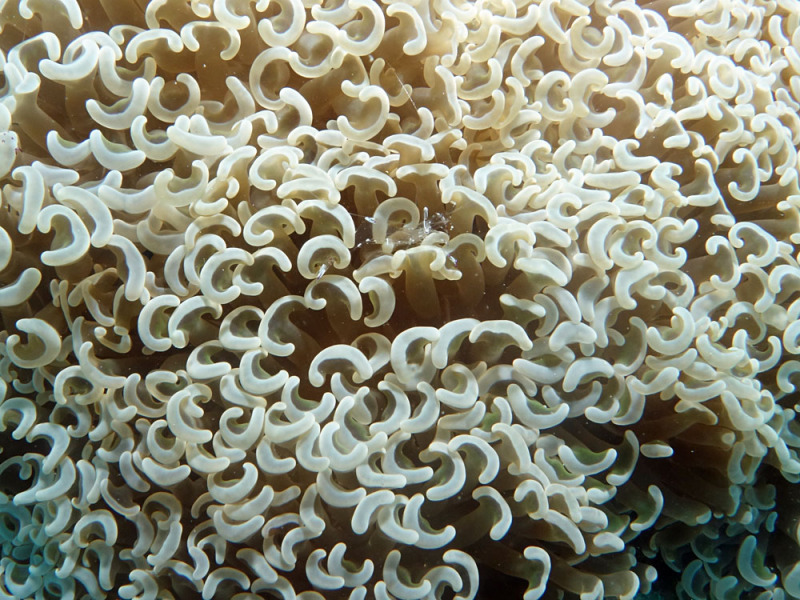
Grey

== Distribution and habitat ==
The anchor coral is widespread throughout the tropical waters of the Indo-West Pacific area from the Maldives to the Salomon Islands with a large presence in Indonesia. It is common in some areas, but it faces several threats that have reduced its overall population. Its coral reef habitat is also degraded and destroyed in many areas.

== Reproduction ==
Fimbriaphyllia ancora is a gonochoristic, and spawns in late spring in Taiwan via external fertilization. As Twan has stated, E. ancora has been found to mass spawn under the definition of Harrison and Wallace which states "the synchronous release of gametes by many species of corals in one evening between dusk and midnight". They form new colonies from tentacle tips which have broken free of parent colonies. Major nights of spawning occur on the 3rd and 6th nights after a full moon during a period of neap tides.

== Development ==
As mentioned before, Fimbriaphyllia ancora is gonochoristic. Prior to spawning, the gametes of are released from the gonads into the polyp coelenteron and has been seen aggregating beneath the oral disk of the polyp. Cleavage begins at the site of the polar body release within 1 or 2 hours after fertilization. The first cell division happens soon after which results in equal or unequal sized blastomeres. Embryos soon after develop into a hollow blastula which flattens out to form a concave dish which then thickens, and redevelops into a spheroidal form. Embryogenesis involves partial differentiation of the outer epidermis and the formation of cilia leading to the development of an early planula stage.

Ciliated larvae form 14 to 24 hours after fertilization. The planulae is now formed. An oral pore and pharynx form by invagination of the ectoderm 24 hours after fertilization. Between 24 and 36 hours, a coelenteron forms and the partially differentiated endoderm is separated from ectoderm by a layer of mesoglea . The planula become elongated and increasingly active with time free swimming around the water column. Benthic searching behavior has been seen 3 to 7 days after fertilization. Planulae have been found to contain an outer ectodermal layer and an interior region that has a large yolk reserve. Vitellogenin (Vg [a major egg yolk protein precursor]) has been identified in Fimbriaphyllia ancora. Ep (another novel yolk protein) was also found in to be E. ancora. Vg and Ep were found to be produced in the ovarian somatic cells adjacent to oocytes. To this date, no other yolk proteins have been found in cnidarians. Zooxanthellae are first incorporated in the planula tissues during development and may enter through the ectoderm near the oral pore. Once the planula had become larger, more developed and successfully attached to settle permanently on a hard substratum, it metamorphoses from the larval form into a juvenile polyp which then initiated the formation of the calcium carbonate exoskeleton.

== Conservation ==
Sea temperature in the tropics have increased by almost 1 °C over the past 100 years and are currently increasing at the rate of 1–2 °C per century. Zooxanthelle corals live close to the upper limit of thermal tolerance and become stressed if exposed to temperatures 1–2 °C above normal. If stressed, corals expel their zoothanthellae and turn white - they 'bleach'. Conservation is a beneficial way to save coral reefs. Coral reefs are sometimes surrounded around poor countries/islands. Scuba and snorkeling activities for tourists are a great way to earn revenue. Like well managed tourist industries, these activities have little or no environmental impact and as they represent an eternally renewable source of income, they are likely to be important in the quest for effective management practices that lead to long-term conservation.
