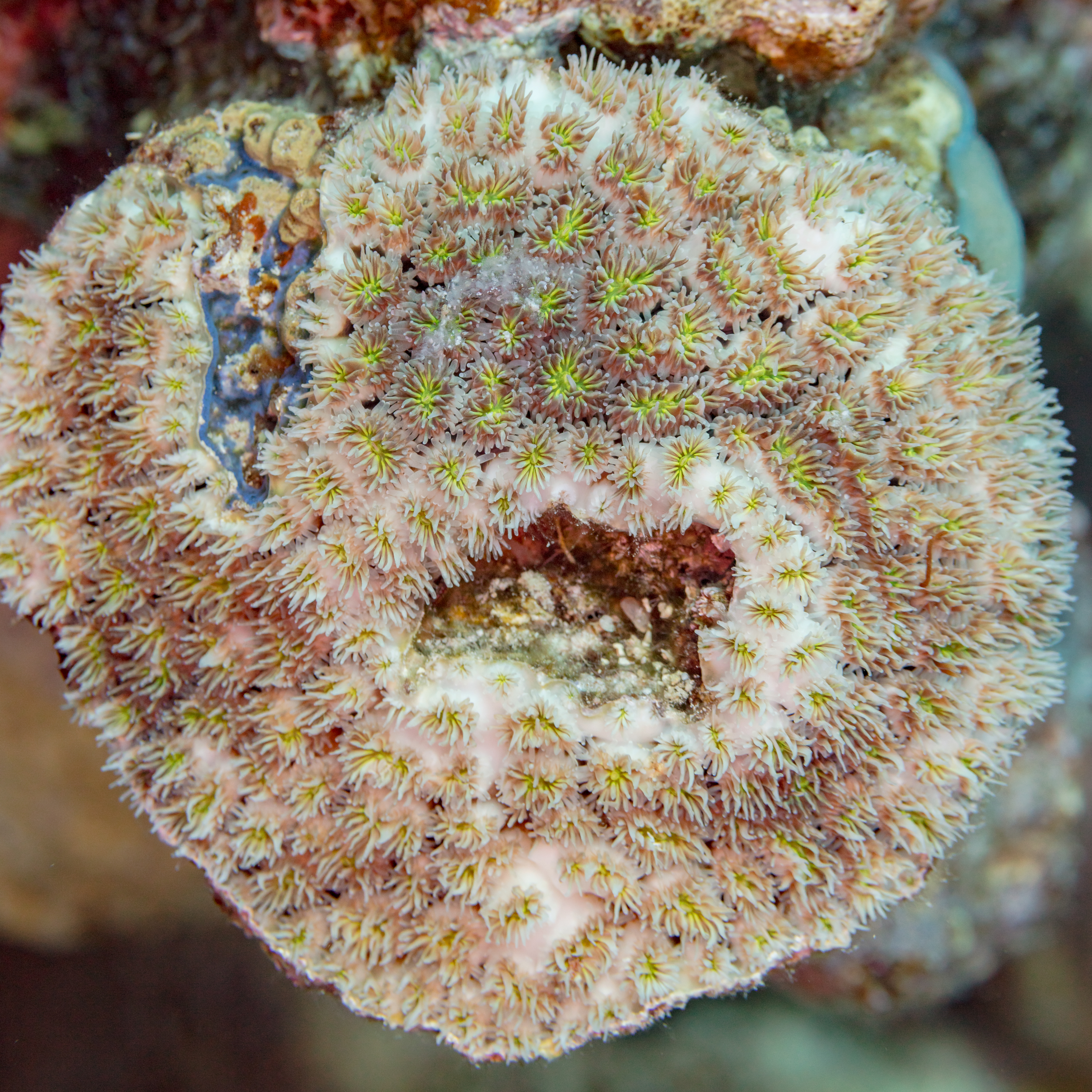
- Galaxea fascicularis

Scientific classification
- Domain: Eukaryota
- Kingdom: Animalia
- Phylum: Cnidaria
- Subphylum: Anthozoa
- Class: Hexacorallia
- Order: Scleractinia
- Family: Euphylliidae
- Genus: Galaxea; Oken, 1815

Species
- See text

Synonyms
- List: Acrhelia Edwards & Haime, 1849; Acrohelia Milne Edwards, 1857; Galaxea Milne Edwards, 1857

= Galaxea =

Genus of corals

Galaxea is a genus of colonial stony corals in the family Euphylliidae. Common names include crystal, galaxy, starburst and tooth coral. They are abundant on reefs in the Indo-Pacific region and the Red Sea. They are found in water less than 20 metres (66 ft) deep and favour turbid sites. They are sometimes kept in reef aquaria.

== Description ==
The colonies of Galaxea have various forms according to species. G. fascicularis forms long, thin columns and is one of the largest corals known. G. paucisepta and G. longisepta form flat plates, G. acrhelia is arborescent and other species form domes and rounded mounds. Their colours are mostly olives or browns but they are often tinged with purple. The corallites in which the individual polyps sit are small and crowded and have raised edges or may even be stalked. There are a large number of fine septa on the edge of the corallites, arranged in whorls and protruding as sharp ridges. The polyps contain symbiotic protists called zooxanthellae and grow in shallow water to maximise the uptake of sunlight. They often feed in the day, extending yellowish or greenish, often white tipped tentacles. They have certain specialised sweeper tentacles, long defensive organs, tipped with powerful cnidocytes which discourage other corals from living close by.

== Species ==
The World Register of Marine Species lists the following species:

- Galaxea acrhelia Veron, 2000
- Galaxea alta Nemenzo, 1979
- Galaxea astreata (Lamarck, 1816)
- Galaxea cryptoramosa Fenner & Veron, 2002
- Galaxea fascicularis (Linnaeus, 1767)
- Galaxea horrescens (Dana, 1846)
- Galaxea lauensis Hoffmeister, 1945 †
- Galaxea longisepta Fenner & Veron, 2000
- Galaxea pauciradiata (Blainville, 1830)
- Galaxea paucisepta Claereboudt, 1990
