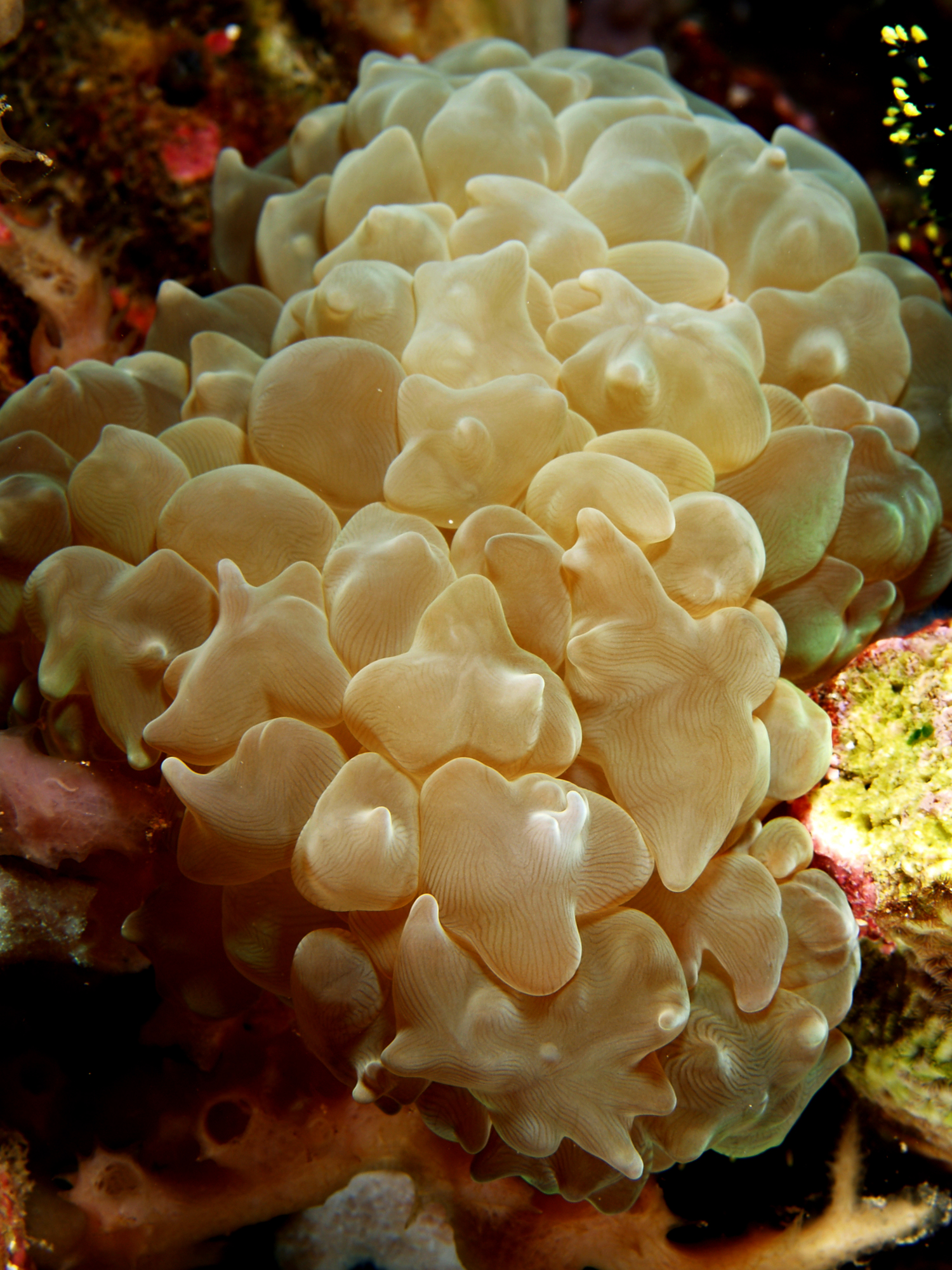
- Plerogyra sinuosa (Bubble coral)

Scientific classification
- Kingdom: Animalia
- Phylum: Cnidaria
- Subphylum: Anthozoa
- Class: Hexacorallia
- Order: Scleractinia
- Family: Plerogyridae
- Genus: Plerogyra; Milne Edwards & Haime, 1848

Species
- See below

= Plerogyra =

Genus of aquatic animals

Plerogyra is a genus of cnidarians belonging to the order Scleractinia.

The species of this genus are found in the Indian and the Atlantic Ocean, as well as in the Suez Canal.

Species:

- Plerogyra cauliformis Ditlev, 2003
- Plerogyra diabolotus Ditlev, 2003 - Devil's Bubble Coral
- Plerogyra discus Veron & Fenner, 2000
- Plerogyra eurysepta Nemenzo, 1960
- Plerogyra multilobata Ditlev, 2003
- Plerogyra simplex Rehberg, 1892 - Branching Bubble Coral
- Plerogyra sinuosa (Dana, 1846) - Bubble Coral
