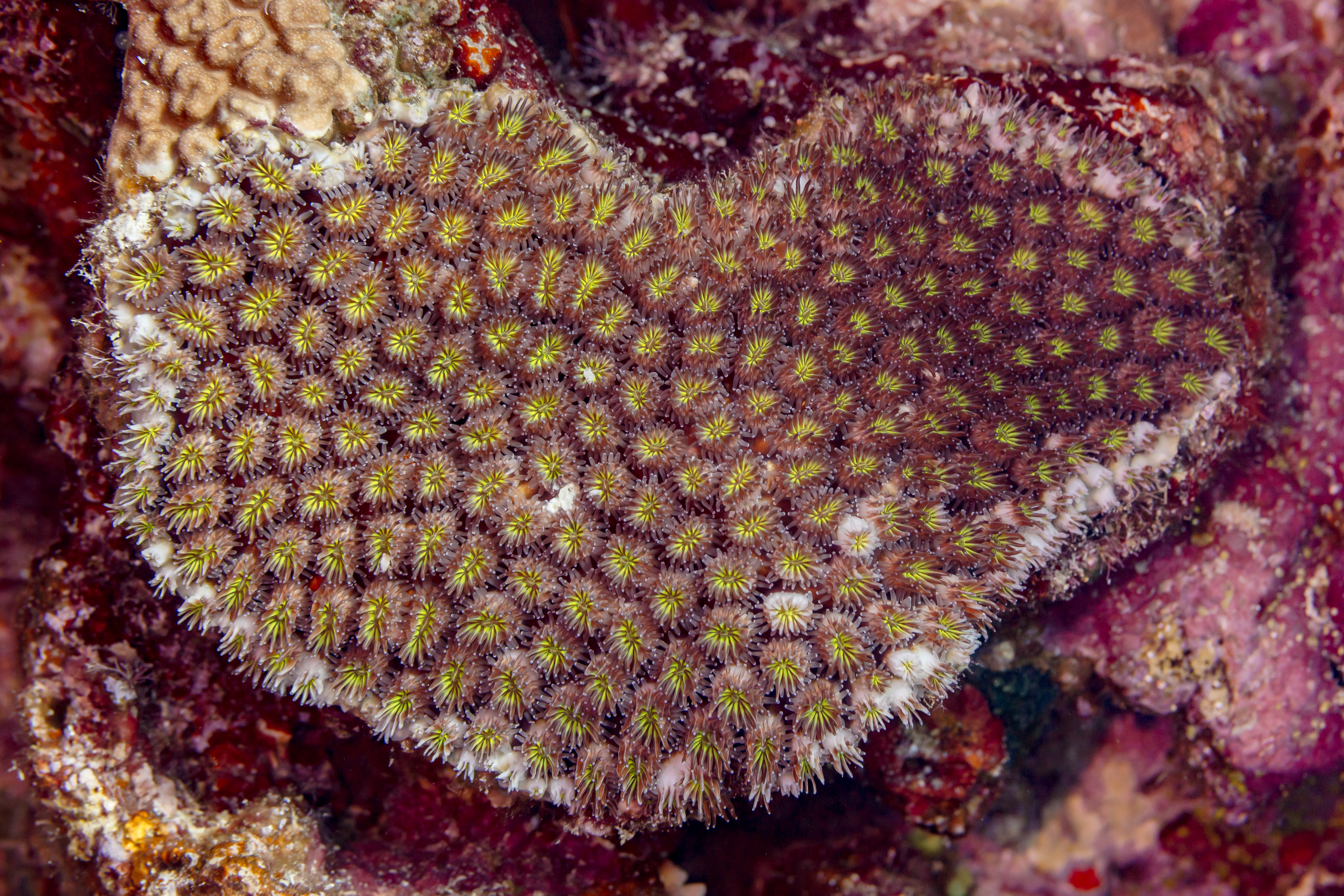

Conservation status
- Least Concern (IUCN 3.1)

Scientific classification
- Kingdom: Animalia
- Phylum: Cnidaria
- Subphylum: Anthozoa
- Class: Hexacorallia
- Order: Scleractinia
- Family: Euphylliidae
- Genus: Galaxea
- Species: G. fascicularis

Binomial name
- Galaxea fascicularis (Linnaeus, 1767)

Synonyms
- List: Galaxea anthophyllites Faurot, 1894; Galaxea aspera Quelch, 1886; Galaxea colamnaris Eguchi & Shirai, 1977 [lapsus]; Galaxea columnaris Eguchi & Shirai, 1977; Galaxea ellisi (Milne Edwards & Haime, 1848); Galaxea esperi (Schweigger, 1820); Galaxea fragilis Quelch, 1886; Galaxea heterocyathus Ortmann, 1889; Galaxea hexagonalis (Milne Edwards & Haime, 1848); Galaxea hystrix Dana, 1846; Galaxea irregularis (Milne Edwards & Haime); Galaxea lawisiana Nemenzo, 1959; Galaxea prolifera Nemenzo & Ferraris, 1982; Galaxea quoyi (Milne Edwards & Haime); Galaxea tenella Brüggemann, 1879; Madrepora fascicularis Linnaeus, 1767; Sarcinula hexagonalis Milne Edwards & Haime, 1848

= Galaxea fascicularis =

Species of coral

Galaxea fascicularis is a species of colonial stony coral in the family Euphylliidae, commonly known as octopus coral, fluorescence grass coral, and galaxy coral among various vernacular names.

It is a common species on reef slopes in the Indo-Pacific region and is kept by enthusiasts in reef aquaria.

== Description ==
Small colonies of Galaxea fascicularis often form low domes but as they grow, the colonies become more irregular, massively hummocky or columnar and may eventually reach 5 metres (16 ft) across. The corals are the calcareous skeletons of polyps and the variability in shape is at least partly caused by the activities of horse mussels (Lithophaga spp.) which bore into the skeletons. The individual polyps are embedded in circular, tube-shaped corallites less than 1 centimetre (0.39 in) across, made of a limy material extruded by the polyps. Lining the corallites are a large number of ridge-like septa radiating from the centre. The polyps often feed in the daytime, and when their tentacles are extended the basic skeleton of the coral is hidden. The general colour of the coral ranges from green and grey to reddish brown. The tentacles are often a contrasting colour and are usually tipped with white. A few of the tentacles are modified into sweeper tentacles which can be extended to 30 centimetres (12 in) in length and serve to deter other organisms from settling close by.

It has been found that the size and proximity of the corallites varies depending on the amount of light incident on the coral, even over different areas of the same colony. In bright positions, small, closely packed corallites maximise the photosynthetic potential of the zooxanthellae. In less well lit positions, there are larger corallites and polyps with longer tentacles with greater food capturing ability.

== Distribution and habitat ==
Galaxea fascicularis is found in the Red Sea, the Gulf of Aden and in large areas of the Indo-Pacific. It occurs on coral reef slopes, particularly where the wave action is weak. Its depth range is between 2 metres (6 ft 7 in) and 15 metres (49 ft).

== Biology ==
Galaxea fascicularis gets its food from two sources. The polyps contain symbiotic photosynthetic microalgae called zooxanthellae which, under good conditions, can obtain almost sufficient energy from sunlight for the coral's needs. It is also heterotrophic; the polyps extend their tentacles and catch and ingest organic particles, sediment, zooplankton, bacteria and even dissolved organic matter. This supplies the rest of the coral's needs.

Galaxea fascicularis can reproduce asexually by budding. It also reproduces sexually, with both sperm and eggs being released into the water table in synchronized spawnings for external fertilisation. The planula larvae that develop from the eggs drift as part of the zooplankton. After heavy attrition by predation, the few that survive settle on the seabed, undergo metamorphosis and develop into a polyp. This starts extruding a skeleton, budding and growing into a new colony.

== Threats ==
In common with other corals that contain zooxanthella, Galaxea fascicularis is likely to be stressed by climate change and the warmer waters it may cause. Adverse effects of a rise in sea temperature may be more severe storms, a greater incidence of the El Niño-Southern Oscillation and more frequent outbreaks of coral disease. Higher water temperatures tend to kill the symbiotic microalgae causing bleaching of the coral. Without their symbionts, the coral fails to thrive and the polyps may die. However, compared to some other reef corals, this species is relatively resistant to bleaching and to being buried by increased sedimentation.

Galaxea fascicularis is a common species but takes about 8 years to reach maturity, making it difficult to assess its status except over long time scales. It is popular in the aquarium trade. In 2005, Indonesia exported 17,550 live pieces and Fiji and other countries exported lesser amounts. Other threats include trawling and consequent reef destruction, pollution and tourism.

== Use in aquaria ==
Galaxy coral is widely available for use in reef aquaria. It has a fragile skeleton and should be handled carefully. The temperature in the tank needs to be maintained between 23 and 27 °C (73 and 81 °F). The coral needs to be in a well lit area with a low or moderate water flow. It should not be placed within 30 centimetres (12 in) of any other coral or sessile invertebrate because it uses its sweeper tentacles to sting intruders and defend its territory. Cultivated corals can be propagated by sawing the skeleton into lengths and suspending the pieces on threads.

Feeding can be conveniently done using the nauplius larvae of the brine shrimp, Artemia salina. These are commercially available for live feeding in the form of cysts which hatch within 24 hours, or as a dead, pasteurized product known as "Instant baby brine shrimp" (IBBS) with a long shelf life. The nutritional value of the larvae can be enhanced by feeding them with special lipid concentrates or other products which accumulate in the tissues. IBBS can in this way be enriched with probiotics or used as a carrier of specific antibiotics to treat coral diseases.
