= Plerogyridae =

Scientific classification
- Domain: Eukaryota
- Kingdom: Animalia
- Phylum: Cnidaria
- Subphylum: Anthozoa
- Class: Hexacorallia
- Order: Scleractinia
- Family: Plerogyridae; Rowlett, 2020

Family of corals

Plerogyridae is a family of cnidarians belonging to the order Scleractinia.

Genera:

- Blastomussa Wells, 1968
- Nemenzophyllia Hodgson & Ross, 1982
- Physogyra Quelch, 1884
- Plerogyra Milne Edwards & Haime, 1848
