= List of corals of the Houtman Abrolhos =

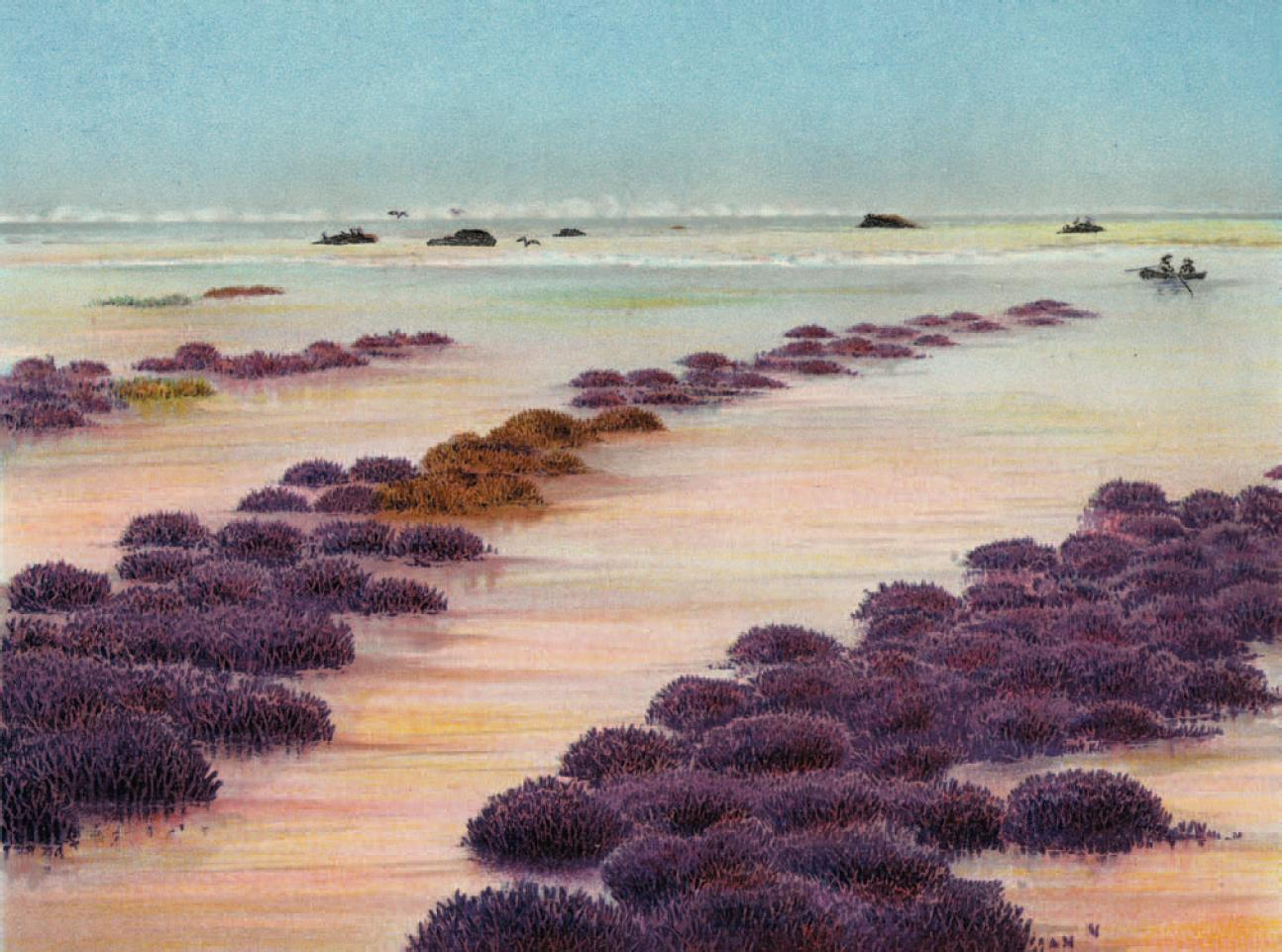
William Saville-Kent painted these corals while visiting the Houtman Abrolhos in 1894. He referred to them as Madrepora, but that name was then applied to virtually any hard coral, and the genus as now circumscribed does not occur in the Abrolhos.

The marine waters of the Houtman Abrolhos, an island chain off the coast of Western Australia, have been recorded as containing 194 species of coral in 50 genera. This is a surprisingly high coral diversity, considering the high latitude of the reef, and the relatively low diversity of other biota. This is a list of corals of the Houtman Abrolhos:

== Hermatypic coral ==
184 species in 42 genera of hermatypic corals have been recorded from the Houtman Abrolhos:

- Acanthastrea echinata
- Acanthastrea hillae
- Acropora abrolhosensis
- Acropora aculeus
- Acropora acuminata
- Acropora anthocercis
- Acropora aspera
- Acropora cerealis
- Acropora dendrum
- Acropora digitifera
- Acropora donei
- Acropora florida
- Acropora formosa
- Acropora glauca
- Acropora grandis
- Acropora granulosa
- Acropora horrida
- Acropora hyacinthus
- Acropora latistella
- Acropora lovelli
- Acropora microphthalma
- Acropora millepora
- Acropora nasuta
- Acropora nobilis
- Acropora pulchra
- Acropora robusta
- Acropora sarmentosa
- Acropora selago
- Acropora solitaryensis
- Acropora spicifera
- Acropora stoddarti
- Acropora subulata
- Acropora tenuis
- Acropora tortuosa
- Acropora valenciennesi
- Acropora valida
- Acropora vaughani
- Acropora verweyi
- Acropora willisae
- Acropora yongei
- Acropora sp. 1
- Alveopora allingi
- Alveopora fenestrata
- Alveopora gigas
- Alveopora spongiosa
- Alveopora tizardi
- Alveopora verrilliana
- Astreopora explanata
- Astreopora gracilis
- Astreopora myriophthalma
- Astreopora ocellata
- Australomussa rowleyensis
- Barabattoia amicorum
- Blastomussa merleti
- Blastomussa wellsi
- Coscinaraea columna
- Coscinaraea exesa
- Coscinaraea marshae
- Cycloseris patelliformis
- Cyphastrea microphthalma
- Cyphastrea serailia
- Diaseris distorta
- Diaseris fragilis
- Echinophyllia aspera
- Echinophyllia orpheensis
- Euphyllia cristata
- Euphyllia divisa
- Euphyllia glabrescens
- Favia favus
- Favia laxa
- Favia lizardensis
- Favia matthaii
- Favia maxima
- Favia pallida
- Favia rotundata
- Favia verona
- Favites abdita
- Favites chinensis
- Favites complanata
- Favites flexuosa
- Favites halicora
- Favites pentagona
- Favites russelli
- Favites sp. 1
- Fungea repanda
- Galaxea fascicularis
- Goniastrea aspera
- Goniastrea australensis
- Goniastrea edwardsi
- Goniastrea favulus
- Goniastrea palauensis
- Goniastrea pectinata
- Goniastrea sp. 1
- Goniopora columna
- Goniopora djiboutiensis
- Goniopora pendulus
- Goniopora stokesi
- Goniopora stutchburyi
- Goniopora tenuidens
- Heteropsammia cochlea
- Hydnophora exesa
- Hydnophora pilosa
- Leptastrea pruinosa
- Leptastrea purpurea
- Leptoseris explanata
- Leptoseris foliosa
- Leptoseris hawaiiensis
- Leptoseris mycetoseroides
- Leptoseris scabra
- Lobophyllia corymbosa
- Lobophyllia hataii
- Lobophyllia hemprichii
- Merulina ampliata
- Montastrea curta
- Montastrea magnistellata
- Montastrea valenciennesi
- Montipora aequituberculata
- Montipora angulata
- Montipora australiensis
- Montipora caliculata
- Montipora capricornis
- Montipora crassituberculata
- Montipora danae
- Montipora digitata
- Montipora efflorescens
- Montipora foliosa
- Montipora grisea
- Montipora hispida
- Montipora hoffmeisteri
- Montipora incrassata
- Montipora informis
- Montipora mollis
- Montipora nodosa
- Montipora peltiformis
- Montipora spongodes
- Montipora spumosa
- Montipora stellata
- Montipora turgescens
- Montipora turtlensis
- Montipora sp. 1
- Montipora sp. 2
- Montipora sp. 3
- Moselaya latistellata
- Mycedium elephantotus
- Oxypora glabra
- Oxypora lacera
- Pachyseris speciosa
- Palauastrea ramosa
- Pavona decussata
- Pavona explanulata
- Pavona maldivensis
- Pavona minuta
- Pavona varians
- Platygyra daedalea
- Platygyra lamellina
- Plesiastrea versipora
- Pocillopora damicornis
- Pocillopora meandrina
- Pocillopora verrucosa
- Porites heronensis
- Porites lichen
- Porites lobata
- Porites lutea
- Porites solida
- Porites sp. 1
- Porites sp. 2
- Porites sp. 3
- Psammocora contigua
- Psammocora digitata
- Psammocora explanulata
- Psammocora haimeana
- Psammocora profundacella
- Psammocora superficialis
- Scapophyllia cylindrica
- Stylocoeniella guentheri
- Symphyllia wilsoni
- Turbinaria bifrons
- Turbinaria conspicua
- Turbinaria frondens
- Turbinaria mesenterina
- Turbinaria peltata
- Turbinaria radiculis
- Turbinaria reniformis
- Turbinaria stellulata

== Ahermatypic coral ==
In addition to the hermatypic corals, the Houtman Abrolhos contains ten species in eight genera of ahermatypic coral.
