= List of endangered species in Pakistan =

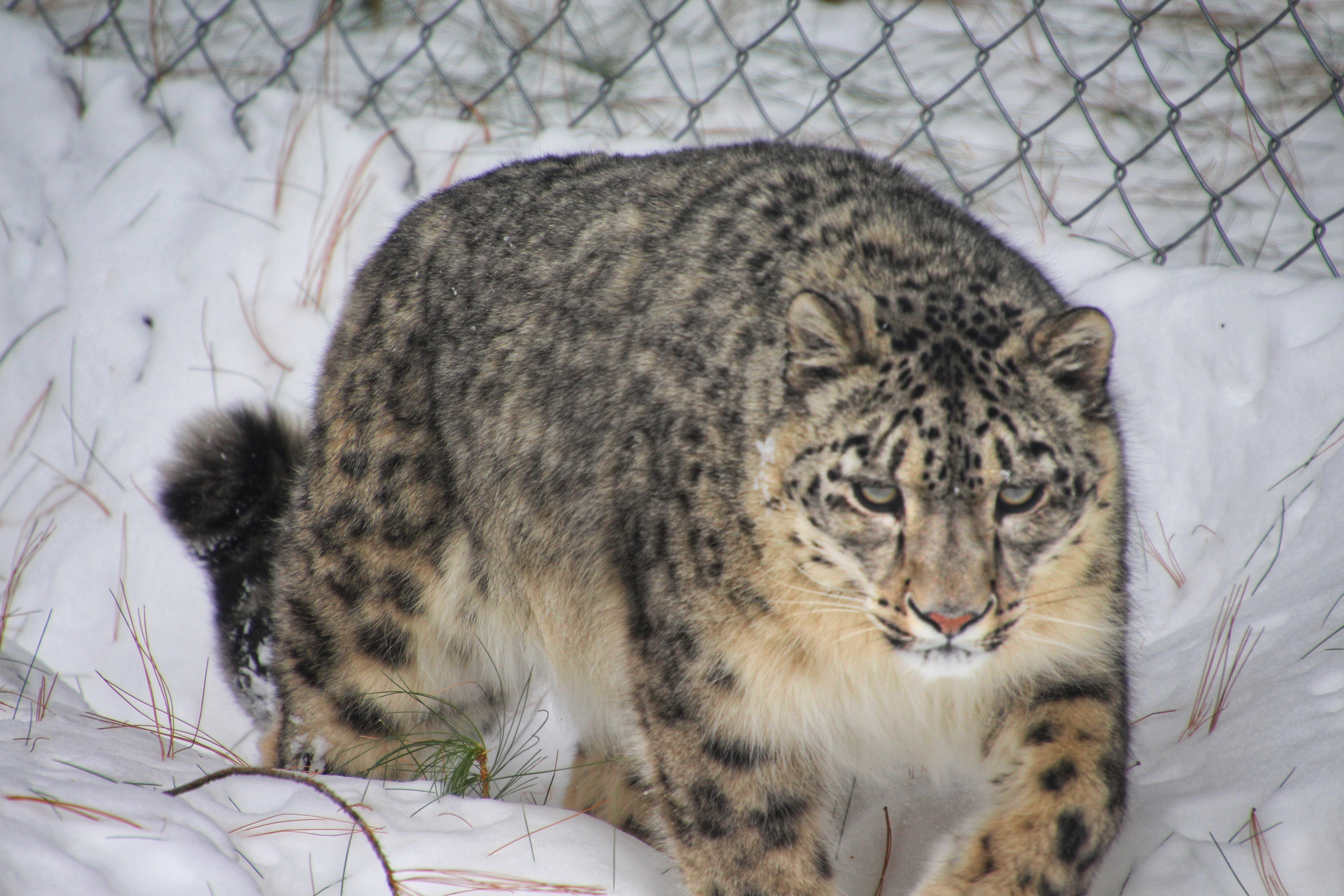
Rescued snow leopard in Naltar Valley

Following is the list of endangered species in Pakistan.

== Mammals ==
Endemic to Pakistan

Common name	Scientific name	Image	Description	Notes
Mountain weasel	Mustela altaica			
Mountain sheep	Ovis ammon			
Asian black bear	Ursus thibetanus			
Balochistan forest dormouse	Dryomys niethammeri		Endemic. The species is only found in juniper forests near Ziarat in Baluchistan. The major threats to this animal are deforestation and degradation of its habitat.	
Black finless porpoise	Neophocaena phocaenoides		The finless porpoise is often caught in fishing nets across the coasts of Pakistan. Other threats to the species include habitat loss, boat traffic, and pollution.	
Burrowing vole	Hyperacrius fertilis		The species is endemic to Kashmir and Khyber Pakhtunkhwa regions. Depletion of habitat due to livestock grazing and human activities are the major threats to this species.	
Kashmir vole	Alticola montosus		The Kashmir vole is found in a few places in Khyber Pakhtunkhwa and Azad Kashmir. Habitat loss due to human activities is the main threat to this species.	
European otter	Lutra lutra		The species is found in the Himalayan river systems of Pakistan where it is listed as an endangered species.	
Marbled polecat	Vormela peregusna		The species is mostly found in desert areas and is facing major threat in the form of habitat destruction.	
Fishing cat	Prionailurus viverrinus			
Himalayan goral	Naemorhedus goral			
Himalayan musk deer	Moschus leucogaster			
Indian pangolin	Manis crassicaudata			
Chinese white dolphin	Sousa chinensis			
Indus river dolphin	Platanista minor		Endemic	
Kashmir muskdeer	Moschus cupreus			
Hairy-footed gerbil	Gerbillus gleadowi			
Markhor	Capra falconeri			
Pallas's cat	Otocolobus manul			
Red deer	Cervus elaphus			
Sand cat	Felis margarita		Endemic. The subspecies Felis margarita scheffeli is endemic to Pakistan.	
Smooth-coated otter	Lutrogale perspicillata			
Wild goat	Capra aegagrus		The subspecies Capra aegagrus blythi and Capra aegagrus chialtanensis are endemic to Pakistan.	
Brown bear	Ursus arctos isabellinus		National status: critically endangered	
Honey badger	Melivora capensis		National status: critically endangered	
Striped hyena	Hyaena hyaena		National status: critically endangered	
Caracal	Caracal caracal		National status: critically endangered	
Leopard	Panthera pardus		National status: critically endangered	
Snow leopard	Panthera uncia		National status: critically endangered	
Indian wild ass	Equus hemionus khur		National status: critically endangered	
Goitered gazelle	Gazella subgutturosa		National status: critically endangered	
Himalayan marmot	Marmota himalayana		National status: critically endangered	

== Reptiles ==
- Testudo horsfieldii

== Birds ==
- Aythya baeri
- Sterna acuticauda
- Threskiornis melanocephalus
- Limosa limosa
- Chaetornis striata
- Catreus wallichii
- Aegypius monachus
- Pelecanus crispus
- Neophron percnopterus
- Numenius arquata
- Falco peregrinus peregrinus
- Coracias garrulus
- Aythya nyroca
- Ardeotis nigriceps
- Clanga clanga
- Chlamydotis undulata
- Rynchops albicollis
- Clanga hastata
- Gyps indicus
- Ficedula subrubra
- Falco jugger
- Phoeniconaias minor
- Falco naumanni
- Anser erythropus
- Tetrax tetrax
- Locustella major
- Marmaronetta angustirostris
- Anhinga melanogaster
- Mycteria leucocephala
- Columba eversmanni
- Haliaeetus leucoryphus
- Circus macrourus
- Prinia burnesii
- Falco cherrug
- Grus antigone
- Grus leucogeranus
- Vanellus gregarius
- Phylloscopus tytleri
- Tragopan melanocephalus
- Oxyura leucocephala
- Gyps bengalensis
- Indicator xanthonotus

== Fishes ==
- Aetomylaeus nichofii
- Thunnus obesus

== Marine animals ==
=== Corals ===
- Acropora: Acropora formosa, Acropora pharaonis, Acropora hyacinthus, Acropora horrida, Acropora granulosa
- Birdsnest coral: Seriatopora caliendrum
- Blue coral: Heliopora coerulea
- Closed brain coral: Leptoria phrygia
- Crisp pillow coral: Anomastraea irregularis
- Erythrastrea flabellata
- Pseudosiderastrea tayami
- Fungia curvata
- Goniastrea peresi, Goniopora stokesi, Goniopora lobata, Goniopora columna
- Hydnophora microconos, Hydnophora exesa
- Montastrea annuligera
- Montipora venosa, Montipora stilosa, Montipora foliosa
- Favites flexuosa, Favites flexuosa, Favites chinensis, Favites micropentagona, Favites halicora
- Galaxea astreata
- Tubipora musica
- Parasimplastrea sheppardi
- Pavona venosa, Pavona diffluens, Pavona decussata, Pavona cactus
- Physogyra lichtensteini
- Platygyra: Platygyra lamellina
- Porites: Porites harrisoni, Porites echinulata
- Psammocora contigua
- Acanthastrea: Acanthastrea hillae
- Turbinaria: Turbinaria reniformis, Turbinaria peltata

== See also ==
- List of mammals of Pakistan
- List of birds of Pakistan
