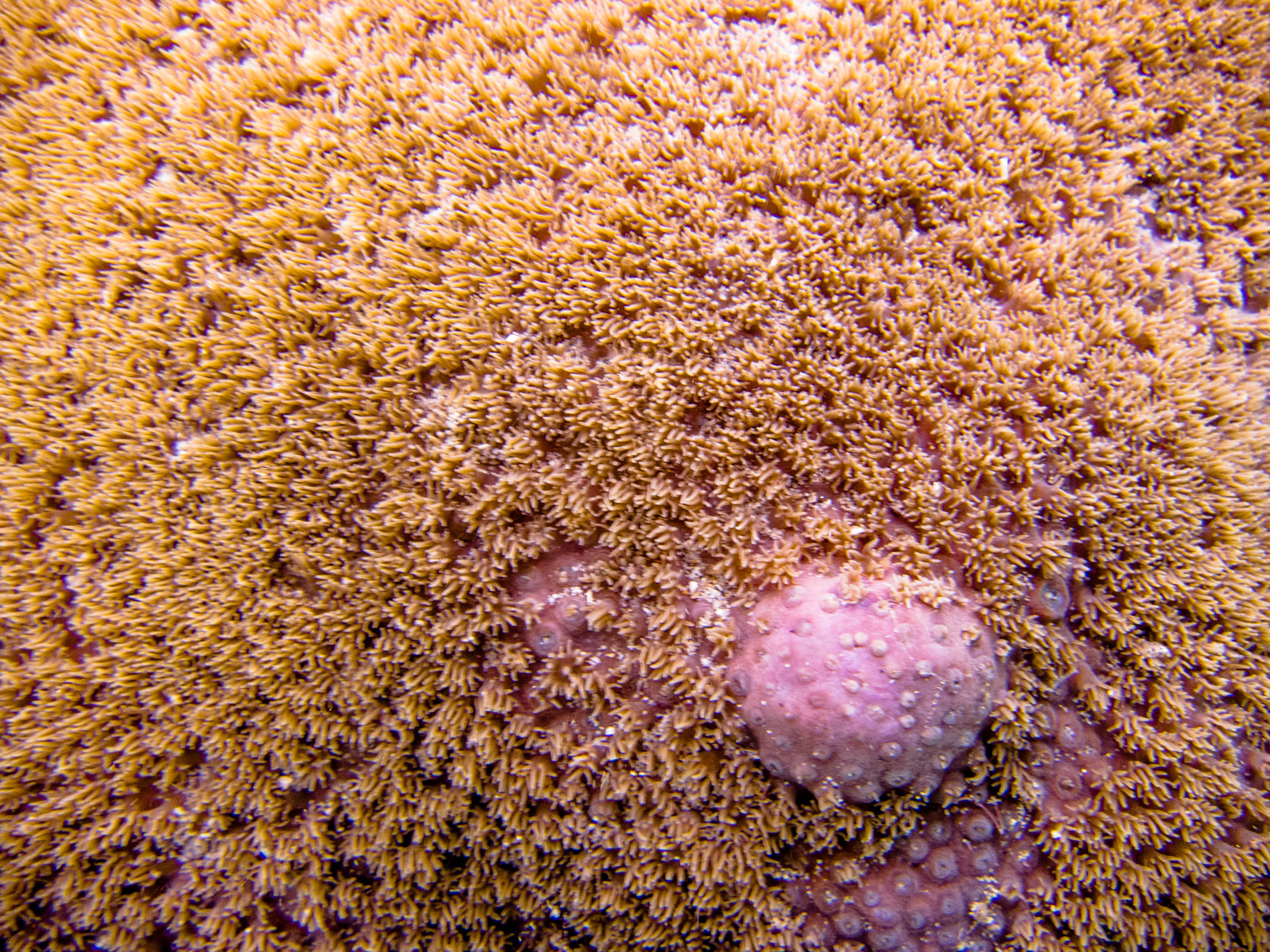

Conservation status
- Least Concern (IUCN 3.1)

Scientific classification
- Kingdom: Animalia
- Phylum: Cnidaria
- Subphylum: Anthozoa
- Class: Hexacorallia
- Order: Scleractinia
- Family: Dendrophylliidae
- Genus: Turbinaria
- Species: T. irregularis

Binomial name
- Turbinaria irregularis Bernard, 1896

Synonyms
- Turbinaria diversa Nemenzo, 1960; Turbinaria eminens Nemenzo, 1971

= Turbinaria irregularis =

Species of coral

Turbinaria irregularis, commonly known as disc coral, is a species of colonial stony coral in the family Dendrophylliidae. It is native to the Indo-Pacific region and is rated as a least-concern species. It is a zooxanthellate coral that houses symbiont dinoflagellates in its tissues. It was described by Bernard in 1896 and is found at depths of 5 to 20 metres (16 to 66 ft) in shallow rocky areas and reefs.

== Description ==
This colonial species is found as irregular encrusting plates and has non-uniform corllites. Its uniform coenosteum is smooth, and the species is mainly dark brown in colour; the colour can be blotched. It has a similar appearance to Turbinaria stellulata. T. irregularis is a zooxanthellate coral that houses symbiont dinoflagellates in its tissues.

== Distribution ==
This species has a very wide range and is common in all parts of the range except the Indian Ocean. It seems to be more resilient to some of the threats facing corals and the International Union for Conservation of Nature has rated its conservation status as being of "least concern". Figures of its population are unknown and its population is considered to be decreasing, but is likely to be threatened by the global reduction of coral reefs, the increase of temperature causing coral bleaching, climate change, human activity, parasites, and disease. It occurs in the eastern and western Indian Ocean, and the northwestern, western central, and eastern central Pacific Ocean. It is found at depths of between 5 and 20 metres (16 and 66 ft) in rocky areas and reefs.

== Taxonomy ==
It was described by H. Bernard in 1896 as Turbinaria irregularis.
