= Turbinaria radicalis =

Conservation status
- Least Concern (IUCN 3.1)

Scientific classification
- Kingdom: Animalia
- Phylum: Cnidaria
- Subphylum: Anthozoa
- Class: Hexacorallia
- Order: Scleractinia
- Family: Dendrophylliidae
- Genus: Turbinaria
- Species: T. radicalis

Binomial name
- Turbinaria radicalis Bernard, 1896

Species of coral

Turbinaria radicalis, also known as disc coral, is a species of colonial stony coral in the family Dendrophylliidae. It is native to the central Indo-Pacific, tropical and sub-tropical Australia, the South China Sea, northern Australia and the West Pacific. It is a zooxanthellate coral that houses symbiont dinoflagellates in its tissues. It is a rare coral throughout its range and the International Union for Conservation of Nature has rated its conservation status as being "least concern".

== Description ==
Colonies of Turbinaria radicalis are encrusting and spread over rocks or have rootlets growing down into the substrate. The surface of the coral is smooth, and the corallites may be sunken or raised on shallow cones. They tend to be aligned in irregular rows. This coral is usually greenish-brown, pale or dark brown with contrasting pale corallites.

== Biology ==
Acanthastrea brevis is a zooxanthellate species of coral. It obtains most of its nutritional needs from the symbiotic dinoflagellates that live inside its soft tissues. These photosynthetic organisms provide the coral with organic carbon and nitrogen, sometimes providing up to 90% of their host's energy needs for metabolism and growth. Its remaining needs are met by the planktonic organisms caught by the tentacles of the polyps.

== Status ==
This coral has a wide range but is rare except in a few subtropical localities. The main threats faced by this and other corals are related to climate change and the mechanical destruction of their coral reef habitats; increasing damage from extreme weather events, rising sea water temperatures and ocean acidification. The International Union for Conservation of Nature has assessed the conservation status of this species as being "vulnerable". All corals receive protection by being listed on CITES Appendix II.
