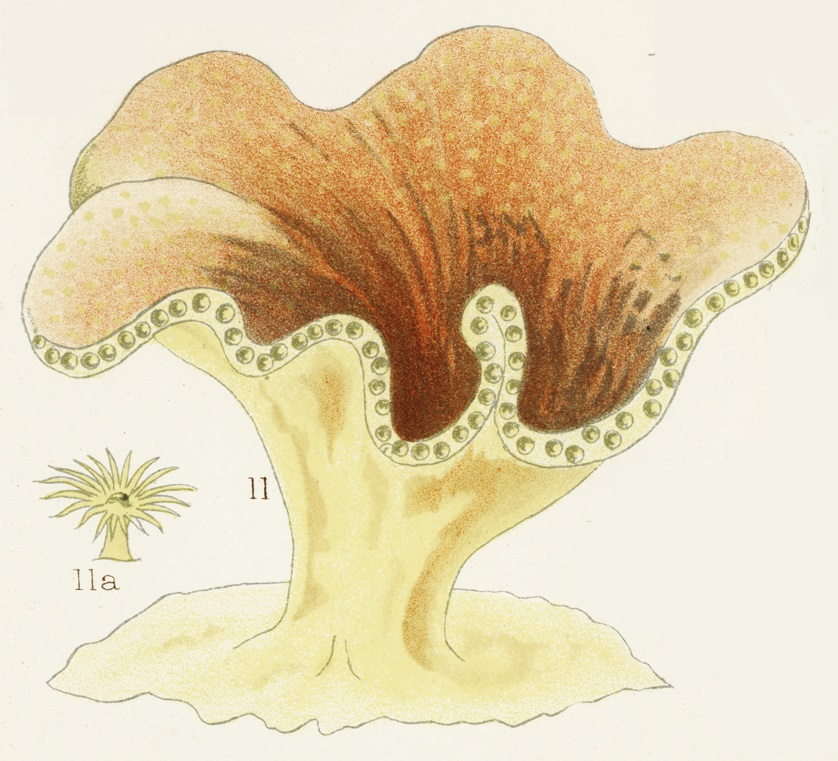

Conservation status
- Least Concern (IUCN 3.1)

Scientific classification
- Kingdom: Animalia
- Phylum: Cnidaria
- Subphylum: Anthozoa
- Class: Hexacorallia
- Order: Scleractinia
- Family: Dendrophylliidae
- Genus: Turbinaria
- Species: T. patula

Binomial name
- Turbinaria patula (Dana, 1846)

Synonyms
- List: Gemmipora patula Dana, 1846; Turbinaria bankae Giebel, 1861; Turbinaria cupula Ehrenberg, 1834; Turbinaria fungiformis Michelin, 1841; Turbinaria robusta Bernard, 1896

= Turbinaria patula =

Species of coral

Turbinaria patula, commonly known as disc coral, is a species of colonial stony coral in the family Dendrophylliidae. It is native to the Indo-Pacific region, being found in the eastern Indian Ocean, northern Australia, the South China Sea and the western Pacific Ocean. It is a zooxanthellate coral that houses symbiont dinoflagellates in its tissues. It is an uncommon species and the International Union for Conservation of Nature (IUCN) has rated it as a "least concern" species.

== Description ==
Its colonies contain upright fronds that are not folded uniformly and contain inclined tube-shaped corallites. Its corallites have 5 millimetres (0.20 in) openings of elliptical shapes. It is green, grey or brown in colour. T. patula is a zooxanthellate coral and houses symbiont dinoflagellates in its tissues.

== Distribution ==
Figures of its population are unknown but are considered to be decreasing, but is likely to be threatened by the global reduction of coral reefs, the increase of temperature causing coral bleaching, climate change, human activity, parasites, and disease. It is an uncommon species throughout most of its range and the International Union for Conservation of Nature has assessed its conservation status as being "least concern". The species is common in some subtropical areas and is found at depths of between 7 and 20 metres (23 and 66 ft) in shallow rocky regions and inshore reefs. It occurs in the eastern Indian Ocean, northern Australia, the South China Sea and the northwestern, western, and western central Pacific Ocean. Ten species were exported in 2005 for aquariums.

== Taxonomy ==
It was described as Gemmipora patula by James Dwight Dana in 1846. Synonyms include Gemmipora patula, Turbinaria bankae, Turbinaria cupula, Turbinaria fungiformis, and Turbinaria robusta.
