= Acropora loisetteae =

Conservation status
- Endangered (IUCN 3.1)

Scientific classification
- Kingdom: Animalia
- Phylum: Cnidaria
- Subphylum: Anthozoa
- Class: Hexacorallia
- Order: Scleractinia
- Family: Acroporidae
- Genus: Acropora
- Species: A. loisetteae

Binomial name
- Acropora loisetteae Wallace, 1994

Species of coral

Acropora loisetteae is a species of acroporid coral that was first described by C. C. Wallace in 1994. Found in marine, tropical, shallow reefs in sheltered lagoons, it is found at depths between 1 and 30 m (3.3 and 98.4 ft). It is listed as vulnerable on the IUCN Red List, and it is thought to have a decreasing population. It is not common but found over a large area, and is listed under CITES Appendix II.

== Description ==
Acropora loisetteae is found in colonies of tree-like structures, and is blue or pink in colour. Branches are circular, straight, thin and up to 110 millimetres (4.3 in) long and between 5 and 12 millimetres (0.20 and 0.47 in) wide. Branchlets contain axial corallites on the end, which are obvious and tube-shaped. The sides of the branchlets contain radial corallites up to 2.8mm wide, which are uniform in size and small. It is similar to Acropora abrolhosensis, Acropora parilis, and Acropora pulchra. It is found in a marine environment in tropical, shallow reefs, located in lagoons sheltered from wave action. It occurs at depths between 1 and 30 m (3.3 and 98.4 ft), and is composed of aragonite (calcium carbonate).

== Distribution ==
Acropora loisetteae is often uncommon and is found over a large area; the Indo-Pacific, Australia, Malaysia, Micronesia, the Philippines, the Adamans, and Banggai. It occurs in two regions of Indonesia, and in four locations in the Marshall Islands. Despite this, it is believed that this species may dominate others in some locations. There is no exact population for the coral, but numbers are known to be declining. It is threatened by climate change, rising sea temperatures causing bleaching, coral disease (cases increasing in the range of the species), reef destruction, being prey to starfish Acanthaster planci, and human activity. It is listed as a vulnerable species on the IUCN Red List, is under CITES Appendix II, and may occur within Marine Protected Areas.

== Taxonomy ==
It was described by C. C. Wallace in 1994 in the Indian Ocean as Acropora loisetteae.
