= Turbinaria heronensis =

Conservation status
- Least Concern (IUCN 3.1)

Scientific classification
- Kingdom: Animalia
- Phylum: Cnidaria
- Subphylum: Anthozoa
- Class: Hexacorallia
- Order: Scleractinia
- Family: Dendrophylliidae
- Genus: Turbinaria
- Species: T. heronensis

Binomial name
- Turbinaria heronensis Wells, 1958

Species of coral

Turbinaria heronensis, commonly known as disc coral, is a species of colonial stony coral in the family Dendrophylliidae. It is native to the Indo-Pacific region where it occurs in shallow water in Indonesia, Malaysia, Papua New Guinea, Fiji, the Philippines and Australia. It is a zooxanthellate coral that houses symbiont dinoflagellates in its tissues. It is an uncommon species and the International Union for Conservation of Nature (IUCN) has rated it as "least concern". It was described by Wells in 1958.

== Description ==
This colonial species reaches diameters of up to 50 centimetres (20 in) and its colonies frequently divide. The species is green, yellow or brown in colour and its corallites are tube-shaped and long. This zooxanthellate stony coral houses symbiont dinoflagellates in its tissues.

== Distribution ==
This rare coral has unknown population figures but the population is considered to be decreasing; the species is likely to be threatened by the global reduction of coral reefs, the increase of temperature causing coral bleaching, climate change, human activity, parasites, and disease. It is found in the eastern Indian Ocean and western central, northwestern and southwestern Pacific Ocean, in the countries of Fiji, Australia, Malaysia, Indonesia, Papua New Guinea, and the Philippines. It is found at depths of between 5 and 15 metres (16 and 49 ft) in subtropical reefs on slopes and flats. The IUCN has rated the conservation status of this species as being of "least concern". It is a rare species but it has a large range. T. conspicua is listed under CITES Appendix II.

== Taxonomy ==
It was described as Turbinaria heronensis by Wells in 1958.
