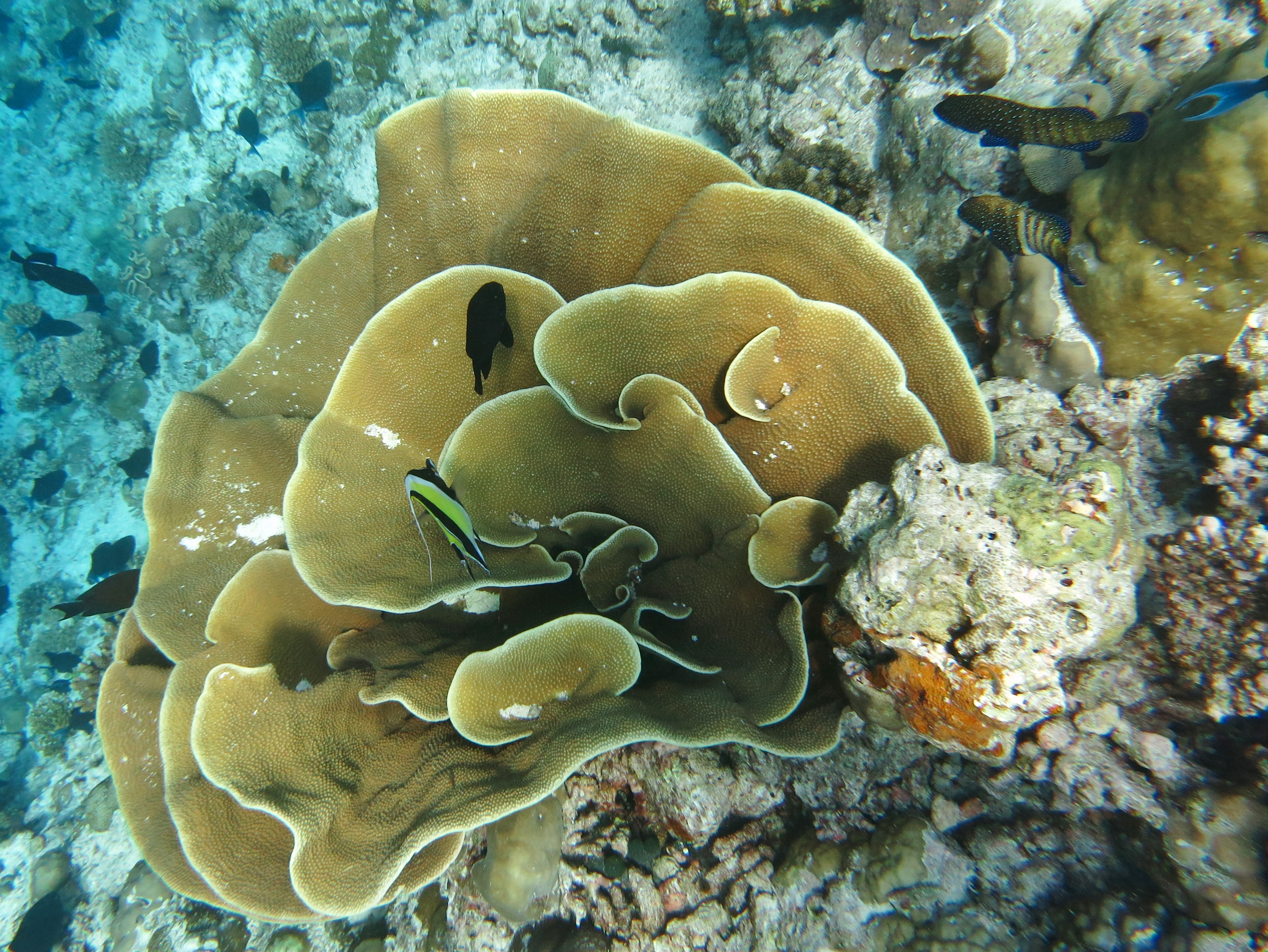

Conservation status
- Least Concern (IUCN 3.1)

Scientific classification
- Kingdom: Animalia
- Phylum: Cnidaria
- Subphylum: Anthozoa
- Class: Hexacorallia
- Order: Scleractinia
- Family: Dendrophylliidae
- Genus: Turbinaria
- Species: T. mesenterina

Binomial name
- Turbinaria mesenterina (Lamarck, 1816)

Synonyms
- List: Explanaria mesenterina Lamarck, 1816; Gemmipora mesenterina (Lamarck, 1816); Turbinaria crassa Bernard, 1896; Turbinaria speciosa Bernard, 1896; Turbinaria tubifera Bernard, 1896; Turbinaria venusta Bernard, 1896

= Turbinaria mesenterina =

Species of coral

Turbinaria mesenterina, commonly known as disc coral, is a species of colonial stony coral in the family Dendrophylliidae. It is native to the Indo-Pacific region. The International Union for Conservation of Nature has rated its conservation status as being "least concern".

== Description ==
Turbinaria mesenterina is encrusting or forms flat or vase-shaped plates with corallites only on one side. The corallites are conical and about 2 mm (0.08 in) in diameter. This coral is quite variable in form, depending on depth and water conditions. It is very common in the Arabian area on sand and other sediments, and there it forms groups of vertical, interlocking plates which are usually greenish yellow, greenish grey or greyish brown. On upper reef slopes, colonies consist of upright or tiered plates, and in deeper water the plates are horizontal.

== Distribution and habitat ==
Turbinaria mesenterina is present in the Indo-Pacific region, its range extending from East Africa and the Red Sea to Taiwan, French Polynesia and eastern Australia. It is common in most reef environments and may be the dominant coral species in turbid habitats.

== Ecology ==
Turbinaria mesenterina is a zooxanthellate species of coral, housing symbiotic dinoflagellates in its tissues. It thrives in turbid water, and is tolerant of high levels of sedimentation. It can clear sediment off its surface within a few hours and may benefit from feeding on organic matter present in the sediment. It has been suggested that higher levels of sedimentation on the Great Barrier Reef of Australia may result in dominance of the reef community by a small number of tolerant species of coral such as T. mesenterina.

== Status ==
Turbinaria mesenterina has a very wide distribution and is common throughout its range. It is collected for the aquarium trade, with Indonesia being the largest exporter. The reefs where it lives are being progressively damaged and rising sea water temperatures causes stress to corals. It is susceptible to coral diseases and bleaching, and although no particular population trend is apparent, the International Union for Conservation of Nature has assessed its conservation status as being "least concern".
