= Turbinaria conspicua =

Conservation status
- Least Concern (IUCN 3.1)

Scientific classification
- Kingdom: Animalia
- Phylum: Cnidaria
- Subphylum: Anthozoa
- Class: Hexacorallia
- Order: Scleractinia
- Family: Dendrophylliidae
- Genus: Turbinaria
- Species: T. conspicua

Binomial name
- Turbinaria conspicua Bernard, 1896

Species of coral

Turbinaria conspicua, commonly known as Disc coral, is a species of colonial stony coral in the family Dendrophylliidae. It is found abundant in the eastern Indian Ocean and the western Pacific region, including Indonesia, Papua New Guinea and northern Australia. It is a zooxanthellaa coral that houses symbiont dinoflagellates in its tissues. It was studied by Bernard in 1896, and he rated it as a least concern species by the International Union for Conservation of Nature (IUCN).

== Description ==
It is a colonial stony coral where its colonies contain bifacial fronds in small diameters. Immersed in them are small corallites and its colour is commonly cream or pale brown. It is a zooxanthellate rare coral that houses symbiont dinoflagellates in its tissues.

== Distribution and conservation ==
Actual population of the species is unknown but is considered to be decreasing, this is likely due to the rapid global reduction of coral reefs, the increase of temperature causing coral bleaching, climate change, human activity, parasites and diseases. It is found in the eastern Indian Ocean and western central Pacific Ocean, in the countries of Australia, Papua New Guinea and Indonesia. It is found at depths of between 2 and 20 metres (6 ft 7 in and 65 ft 7 in) in shallow reefs. The IUCN has rated the conservation status of this species as being of "least concern". It is an uncommon species, but the areas in which it is found in northern Australia have been less affected by the damage to the reefs compared to other regions. T. conspicua is listed under CITES Appendix II.

== Taxonomy ==
The disc coral was described as Turbinaria conspicua by H. Bernard in 1896.
