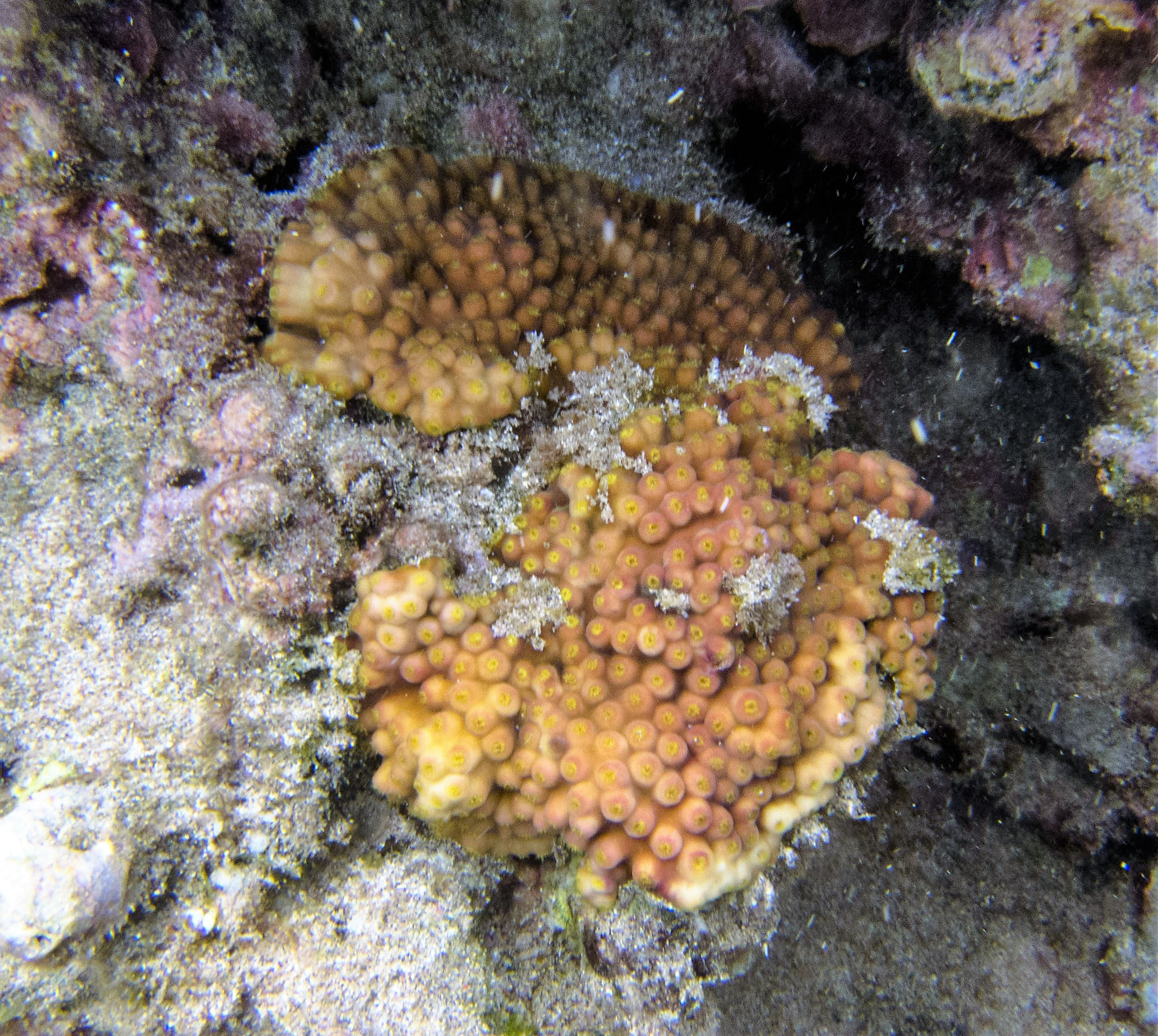

Conservation status
- Least Concern (IUCN 3.1)

Scientific classification
- Kingdom: Animalia
- Phylum: Cnidaria
- Subphylum: Anthozoa
- Class: Hexacorallia
- Order: Scleractinia
- Family: Dendrophylliidae
- Genus: Turbinaria
- Species: T. frondens

Binomial name
- Turbinaria frondens (Dana, 1846)

Synonyms
- List: Gemmipora frondens Dana, 1846; Turbinaria abnormalis Bernard, 1896; Turbinaria aurantiaca Bernard, 1896; Turbinaria contorta Bernard, 1896; Turbinaria danae Bernard, 1896; Turbinaria edwardsi Bernard, 1896; Turbinaria foliosa Bernard, 1896; Turbinaria frondescens Milne Edwards, 1860; Turbinaria magna Bernard, 1896; Turbinaria pustulosa Bernard, 1896; Turbinaria ramosa Yabe & Sugiyama, 1941; Turbinaria rugosa Bernard, 1896

= Turbinaria frondens =

Species of coral

Turbinaria frondens, commonly known as disc coral, is a species of colonial stony coral in the family Dendrophylliidae. It is native to the Indo-Pacific region. It is a zooxanthellate coral that houses symbiont dinoflagellates in its tissues.

This is a common species throughout its wide range and the International Union for Conservation of Nature has rated its conservation status as being of "least concern".

== Description ==
Colonies of Turbinaria frondens are variable and may be massive, encrusting, cup-shaped, foliaceous or columnar. They are initially cup-shaped and develop lobes and fronds, either upright or horizontal, often irregularly contorted. The lobes are one-sided with corallites only on one surface. The corallites are cone-shaped, about 2 mm (0.08 in) in diameter. They protrude on convex surfaces but are immersed and crowded close together on concave surfaces. This coral is usually dark brown, greenish-brown or grey. The colonies can grow to a width of about one metre.

== Distribution and habitat ==
Turbinaria frondens is native to the Indo-Pacific region. Its range extends from East Africa and the Red Sea to Japan, Taiwan, the Philippines, Indonesia and northern Australia. It is found on shallow-water reefs and rocky foreshores at depths from about 7 to 20 m (23 to 66 ft).

== Ecology ==
Turbinaria frondens is gonochoristic, with colonies being either male or female. Breeding takes place synchronously with all the colonies in an area liberating their gametes into the sea shortly after the full moon in October.

== Status ==
Turbinaria frondens is a common species throughout its wide range and is likely to be more resistant than other species to some of the problems facing corals which include ocean acidification, global climate change, coral diseases and coral bleaching. The chief threat it faces is the destruction of its reef habitats. The International Union for Conservation of Nature has assessed its conservation status as being of "least concern".
