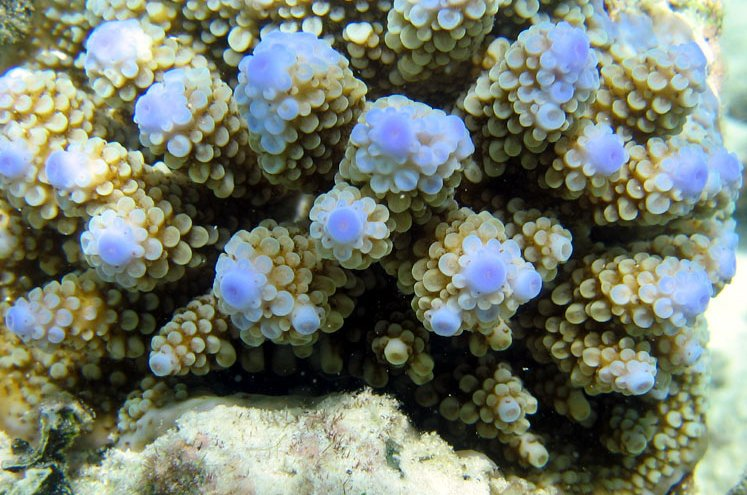

Conservation status
- Endangered (IUCN 3.1)

Scientific classification
- Kingdom: Animalia
- Phylum: Cnidaria
- Subphylum: Anthozoa
- Class: Hexacorallia
- Order: Scleractinia
- Family: Acroporidae
- Genus: Acropora
- Species: A. nasuta

Binomial name
- Acropora nasuta (Dana, 1846)

Synonyms
- Acropora diomedeae Vaughan, 1906; Madrepora canaliculata Klunzinger, 1879; Madrepora effusa Dana, 1846; Madrepora nasuta Dana, 1846

= Acropora nasuta =

Species of coral

Acropora nasuta is a species of branching stony coral in the family Acroporidae. It is native to the western and central Indo-Pacific where it is found in shallow reef habitats. Like other corals of the genus Acropora, it is susceptible to coral bleaching and coral diseases and the IUCN has listed it as being "Endangered".

== Description ==
Acropora nasuta is a small colonial coral that grows in clumps which tend to develop flat tops. The branches are tapering and up to 12 mm (0.5 in) wide. The radial corallites usually form neat rows, sometimes being long and slender and sometimes appressed. The axial corallites may be larger or the same size as the radial corallites. The colour of this coral is creamy-white or pale brown and the branch tips are sometimes bluish.

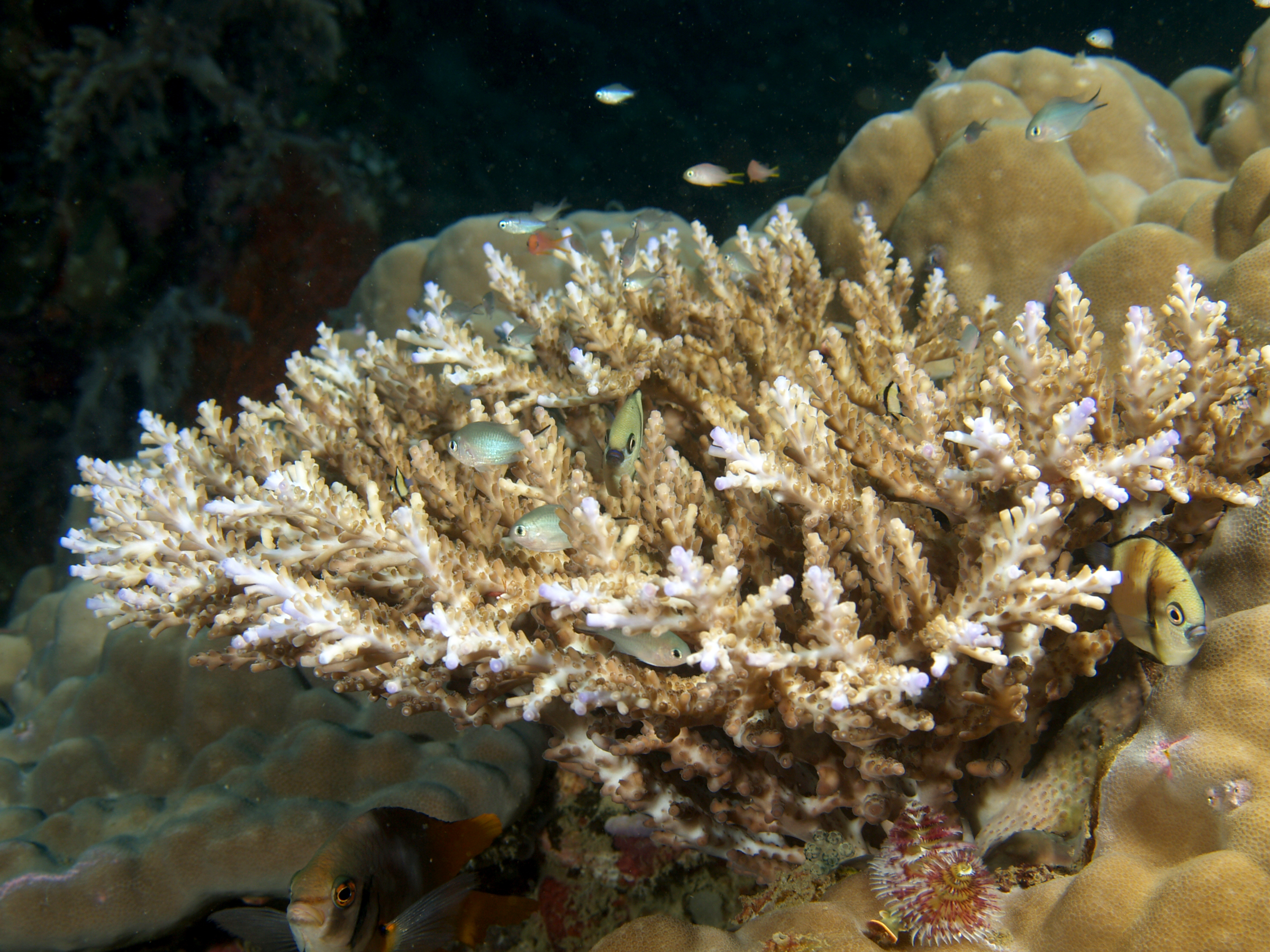
Fish often hide among the branches

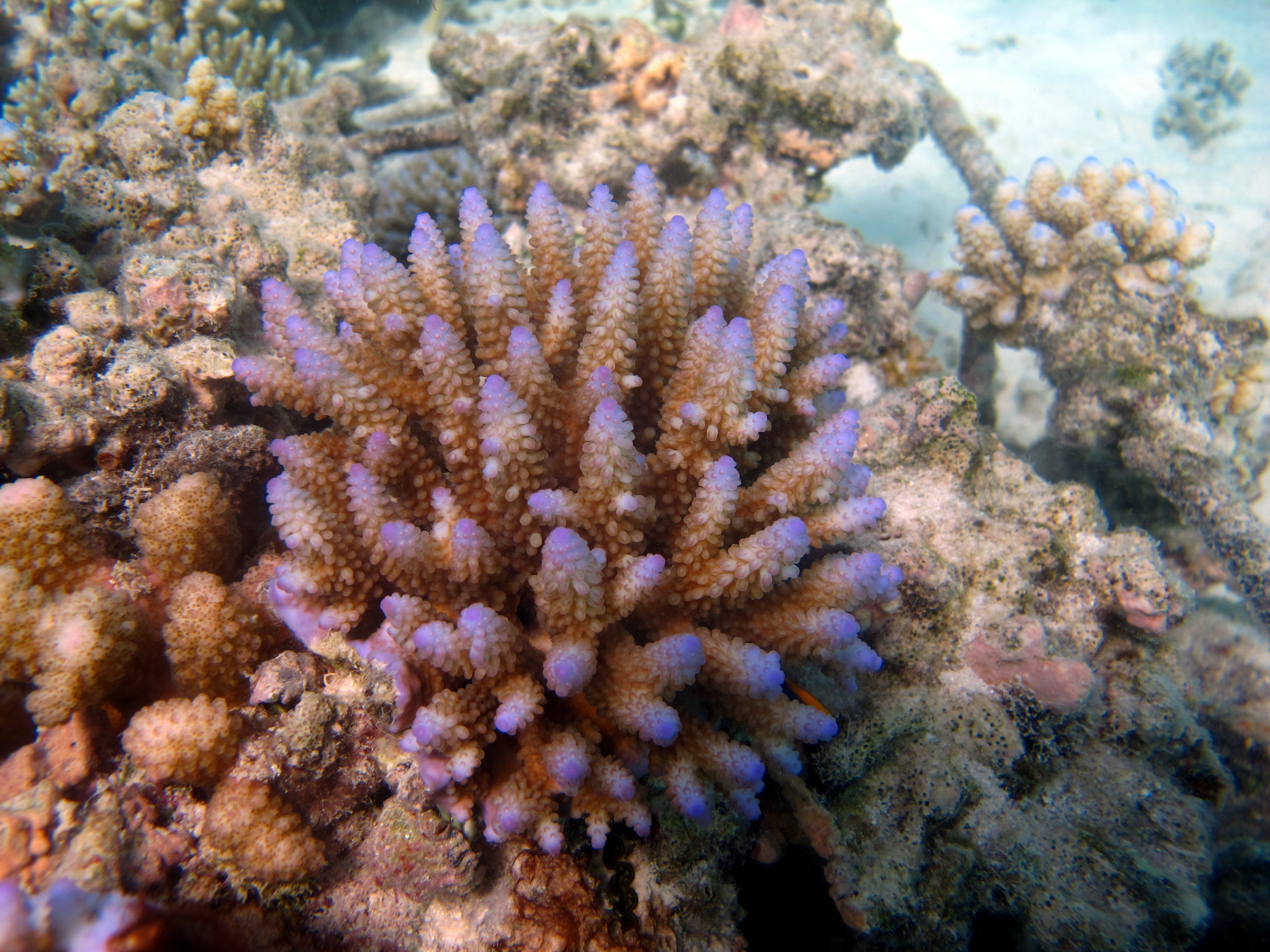
A. nasuta in the Maldives

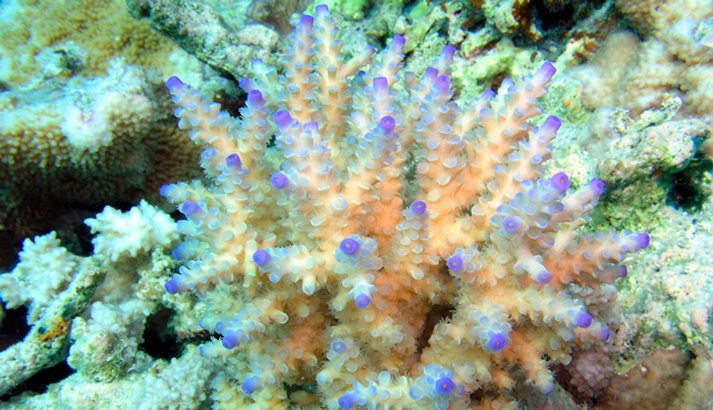
Close up

== Distribution and habitat ==
Acropora nasuta is a common species and is found in the western and central Indo-Pacific. Its range extends from the Red Sea, the Gulf of Aden and the east coast of Africa to India, Malaysia, Japan, Indonesia and Australia. This coral grows in shallow water, between three and fifteen metres (ten and fifty feet) deep, mostly on upper reef slopes and reef edges.

== Ecology ==
Acropora nasuta is a zooxanthellate coral. This means that it has symbiotic dinoflagellate algae living within its tissues and these employ photosynthesis to make complex carbohydrates from which the coral benefits. Besides this, the coral gets nourishment from the polyps which project from the corallites at night and extend their tentacles to feed on plankton. There are usually barnacles of several species growing on the branches of the coral and certain species of small fish, crabs and shrimps live permanently among the branches. The crown-of-thorns starfish (Acanthaster planci) preferentially feeds on Acropora species corals.

== Status ==
The main threat affecting Acropora nasuta is the destruction of the coral reefs where it lives. Although relatively common, it is a shallow water species and susceptible to bleaching and coral diseases. It is also collected for the reef aquarium trade. Corals in general are expected to be impacted by rising sea temperatures and ocean acidification. For these reasons, the IUCN has listed Acropora nasuta as being an endangered species.
