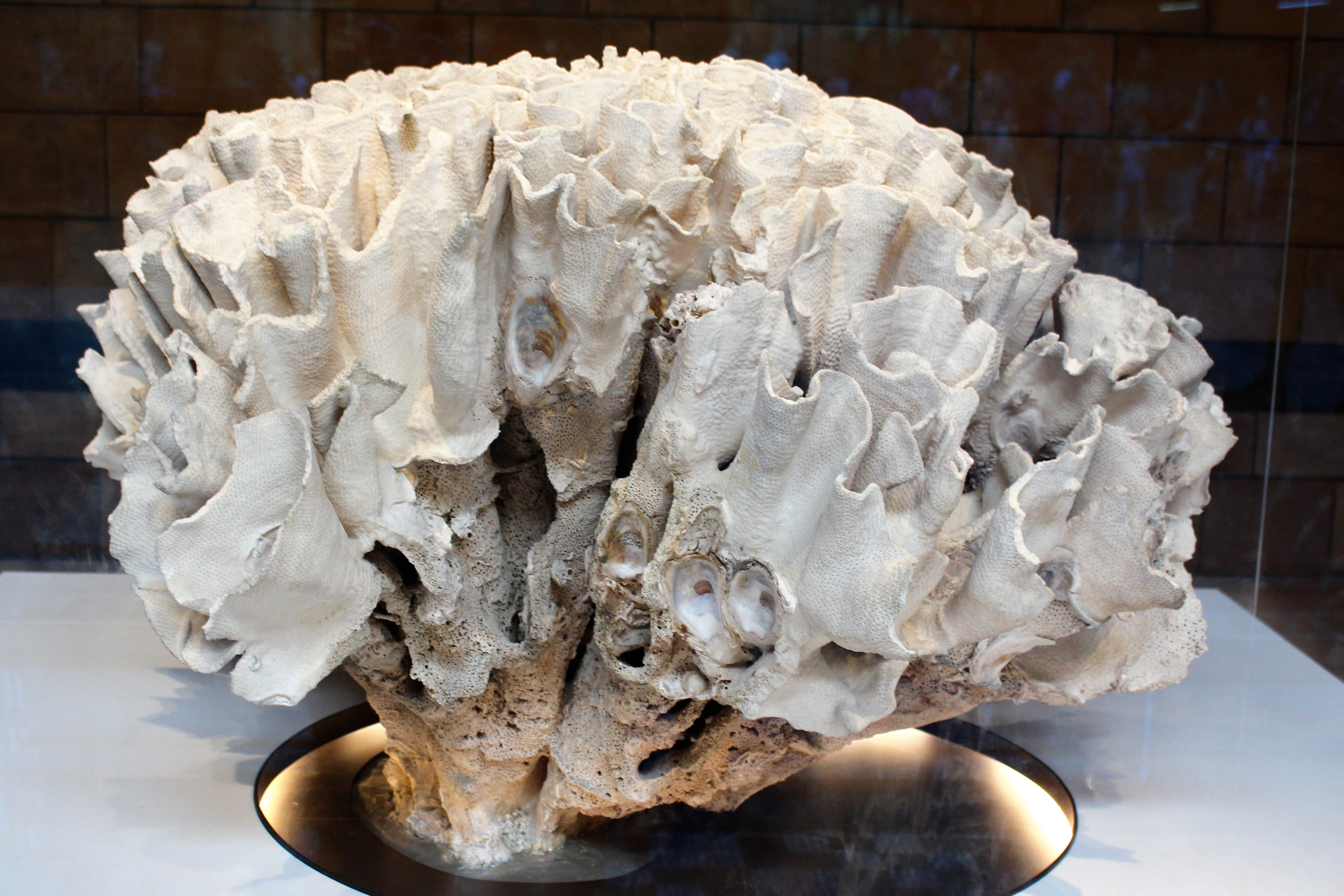

Conservation status
- Least Concern (IUCN 3.1)

Scientific classification
- Kingdom: Animalia
- Phylum: Cnidaria
- Subphylum: Anthozoa
- Class: Hexacorallia
- Order: Scleractinia
- Family: Dendrophylliidae
- Genus: Turbinaria
- Species: T. bifrons

Binomial name
- Turbinaria bifrons Brüggemann, 1877

Synonyms
- List: Turbinaria aequalis Quelch, 1886; Turbinaria dendrophyllia Bernard, 1896; Turbinaria gracilis Bernard, 1896; Turbinaria nidifera Bernard, 1896

= Turbinaria bifrons =

Species of coral

Turbinaria bifrons, commonly known as disc coral, is a species of colonial stony coral in the family Dendrophylliidae. It is native to the Indo-Pacific region. It is a zooxanthellate coral that houses symbiont dinoflagellates in its tissues. This is an uncommon species and the International Union for Conservation of Nature has rated its conservation status as being "vulnerable".

== Description ==
Turbinaria bifrons is a zooxanthellate hermatypic coral and its tissues contain symbiont dinoflagellates. Its colonies begin as thin layers that become bifacial fronds that are vertical and elongated. It has conical corallites with regular shapes and sizes. The coral is mostly brown, green or grey in colour.

== Distribution ==
It is classed as a vulnerable species on the IUCN Red List and it is believed that its population is decreasing in line with the global decline of coral reefs; the species is also listed under Appendix II of CITES. Figures of its population are unknown, but is likely to be threatened by the global reduction of coral reefs, the increase of temperature causing coral bleaching, climate change, human activity, parasites, and disease. This uncommon species occurs in the eastern Indian Ocean, Australia, Japan, the South China Sea, and the northwestern, southwestern, and western central Pacific Ocean. It is found at depths of between 2 and 25 metres (6 ft 7 in and 82 ft 0 in) in subtropical rocky areas and shallow reefs.

== Taxonomy ==
It was described as Turbinaria bifrons by Brüggemann in 1877. It is also known by synonyms Turbinaria aequalis, Turbinaria dendrophyllia, Turbinaria gracilis, and Turbinaria nidifera.
