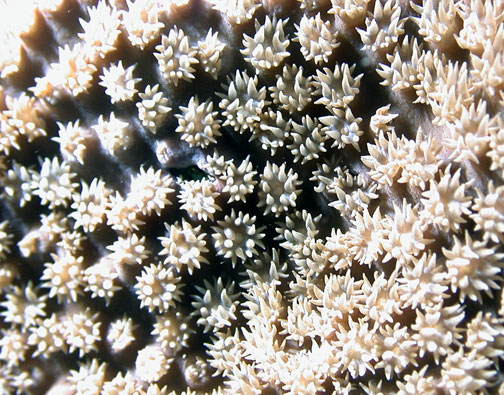
- T. stellulata with polyps extended

Conservation status
- Least Concern (IUCN 3.1)

Scientific classification
- Kingdom: Animalia
- Phylum: Cnidaria
- Subphylum: Anthozoa
- Class: Hexacorallia
- Order: Scleractinia
- Family: Dendrophylliidae
- Genus: Turbinaria
- Species: T. stellulata

Binomial name
- Turbinaria stellulata (Lamarck, 1816)

Synonyms
- List: Astraea stellulata Lamarck, 1816; Astrea stellulata Lamarck, 1816; Astreopora stellulata (Lamarck, 1816); Turbinaria carinata Nemenzo, 1971; Turbinaria elegans Bernard, 1896; Turbinaria globularis Bernard, 1896; Turbinaria hemisphaerica Rehberg, 1892; Turbinaria mantonae Crossland, 1952; Turbinaria nitida Nemenzo, 1960; Turbinaria stephensoni Crossland, 1952; Turbinaria subversa Bernard, 1896; Turbinaria titizimaensis Yabe & Sugiyama, 1941

= Turbinaria stellulata =

Species of coral

Turbinaria stellulata, also known as disc coral, is a species of colonial stony coral in the family Dendrophylliidae. It is native to the Indo-Pacific region. The International Union for Conservation of Nature has rated its conservation status as being "least concern".

== Description ==
Turbinaria stellulata tends to be submassive with encrusting margins and does not produce vertical structures to any extent. The corallites are about 2 mm (0.08 in) in diameter and have thick walls. This coral is a zooxanthellate coral that houses symbiont dinoflagellates in its tissues. It is usually some shade of brown or green, but other colours sometimes occur, depending on which species of symbiont is present. Colonies are dome-shaped and grow to a diameter of about 50 cm (20 in).

== Distribution and habitat ==
Turbinaria stellulata occurs in the Indo-Pacific region. Its range extends from the Red Sea and Madagascar to tropical Australia, southern Japan and the South China Sea. It occurs on upper reef slopes at depths from 2 to 15 metres (6 to 50 ft ), and unlike other corals in its genus Turbinaria, it seems to avoid turbid water.

== Biology ==
As a zooxanthellate coral, Turbinaria stellulata gets part of its nutritional needs from the photosynthetic symbionts in its tissues, but also extends its polyps to feed, mostly at night. Colonies are either male or female and are broadcast spawners. All the colonies in an area liberate their eggs and sperm into the sea in a spawning event which is synchronised with the phases of the moon. The planula larvae that develop form part of the plankton and eventually settle in a suitable location on the seabed.

== Status ==
In general, the threats that stony corals face include global climate change with the resulting rise in the temperature of sea water, ocean acidification, increased severity of storms which damage reefs, increased frequency of El Niño events, coral bleaching and the increasing incidence of coral diseases. The population trend of Turbinaria stellulata has not been monitored but as a shallow water coral it is affected by these factors. It has a wide range but is an uncommon species and the International Union for Conservation of Nature has assessed its conservation status as being "least concern".
