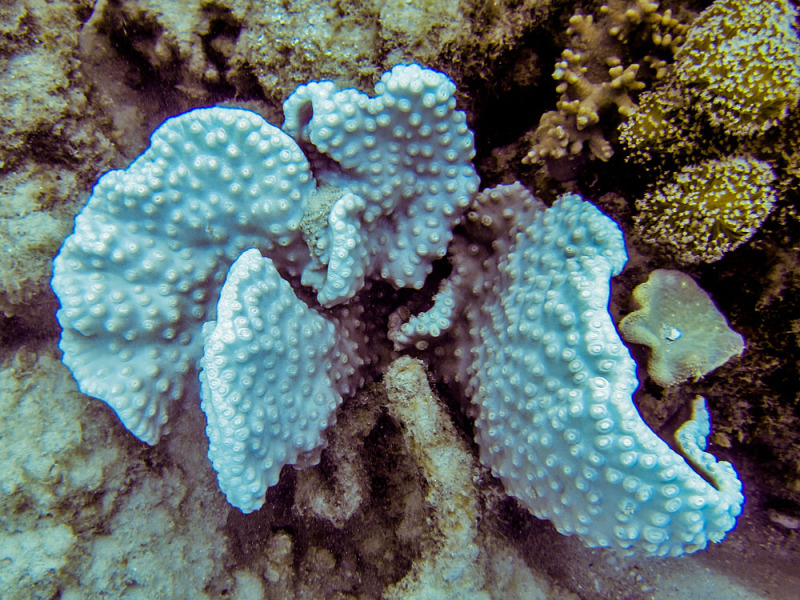

Conservation status
- Least Concern (IUCN 3.1)

Scientific classification
- Kingdom: Animalia
- Phylum: Cnidaria
- Subphylum: Anthozoa
- Class: Hexacorallia
- Order: Scleractinia
- Family: Dendrophylliidae
- Genus: Turbinaria
- Species: T. peltata

Binomial name
- Turbinaria peltata (Esper, 1794)

Synonyms
- List: Gemmipora fungiformis de Blainville, 1830; Gemmipora peltata (Esper, 1794); Madrepora peltata Esper, 1794; Turbinaria dichotoma Verrill, 1871; Turbinaria marima Ortmann, 1888; Turbinaria maxima Ortmann, 1888

= Turbinaria peltata =

Species of cnidarian

Turbinaria peltata, commonly known as disc coral, is a species of colonial stony coral in the family Dendrophylliidae. It is native to the Indo-Pacific region. The International Union for Conservation of Nature has rated its conservation status as being "least concern".

== Description ==
Turbinaria peltata may be foliaceous or encrusting, and tends to form thick, flat plates, often in overlapping tiers. The colonies may be several metres in diameter. The corallites are found on a single side of each plate and are about 3 to 5 mm (0.12 to 0.20 in) in diameter, being either immersed in the skeleton or raised on tubular mounds. On the upper surfaces of larger colonies, two-sided ridges or cylindrical columns may form. The calyces are 3 to 5 mm (0.12 to 0.20 in) in diameter, circular and leaning towards the plate margin. The septa are arranged in three cycles, the third one often being reduced or absent. The septa are granulated and the columella is domed and spongy, or alternatively, has a central plate. The polyps of this species are often extended to feed during the daytime. They have thick tentacles up to 1 cm (0.4 in) long. This coral is usually some shade of grey or brown. It is a zooxanthellate coral that houses symbiont dinoflagellates in its tissues.

== Distribution and habitat ==
Turbinaria peltata is native to the warm waters of the Indo-Pacific region. Its range extends from the coast of East Africa to Taiwan and American Samoa. It is common in most shallow water habitats such as rocky foreshores and shallow reef slopes, especially in areas of turbid water.

== Biology ==
Colonies of Turbinaria peltata grow by extra-tentacular budding. This means that new corallites grow between existing ones, outside the corallite walls. The new corallites tend to be small and make the surface appear more crowded.

== Conservation status ==
The International Union for Conservation of Nature has assessed the conservation status of Turbinaria peltata as being "least concern species". Although it is a common species with a widespread distribution, it faces a number of threats. It is collected for the aquarium trade, rising sea water temperatures and ocean acidification cause stressful conditions and make it more susceptible to coral bleaching and coral diseases. Localised threats include fisheries, damage to reefs, tourism, pollution and sedimentation.
