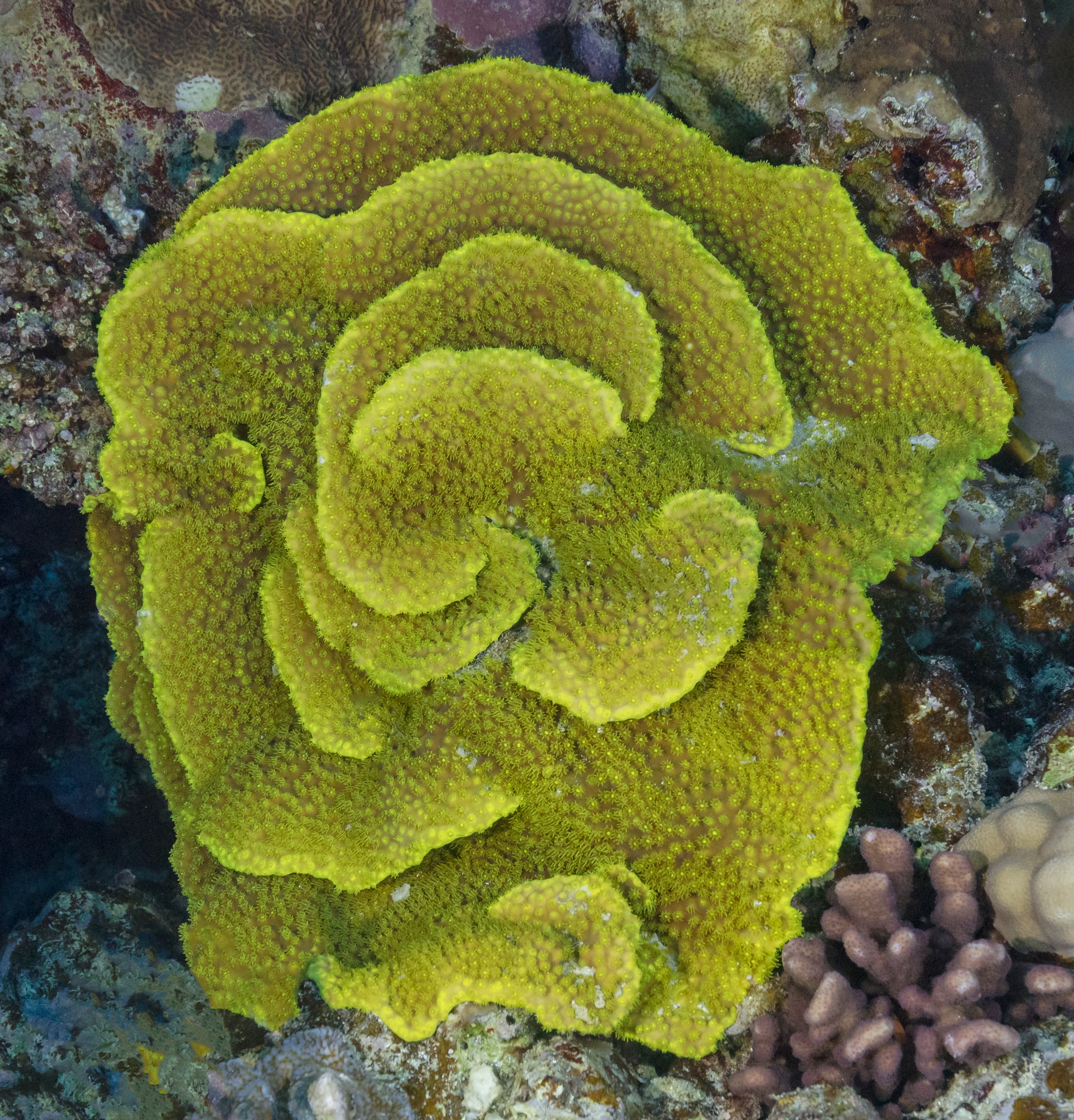

Conservation status
- Least Concern (IUCN 3.1)

Scientific classification
- Kingdom: Animalia
- Phylum: Cnidaria
- Subphylum: Anthozoa
- Class: Hexacorallia
- Order: Scleractinia
- Family: Dendrophylliidae
- Genus: Turbinaria
- Species: T. reniformis

Binomial name
- Turbinaria reniformis Bernard, 1896

Synonyms
- List: Turbinaria disparata Nemenzo, 1979; Turbinaria lichenoides Bernard, 1896; Turbinaria reptans Bernard, 1896; Turbinaria veluta Bernard, 1896

= Turbinaria reniformis =

Species of coral

Turbinaria reniformis, commonly known as yellow scroll coral, is a species of colonial stony coral in the family Dendrophylliidae. It is native to the Indo-Pacific region. The International Union for Conservation of Nature has rated its conservation status as being "least concern".

== Description ==
Turbinaria reniformis is a laminar species, forming horizontal plates or shallow chalices, and sometimes forming tiers. The corallites (skeletal cups in which the polyps sit) are widely separated and are only on the upper side of the plates. The corallites are 1.5 to 2 mm (0.06 to 0.08 in) in diameter, have thick walls and are either sunk into the coenosteum (skeletal tissue) or are conical in shape. This coral has a distinct rim free of corallites, and is usually a yellowish-green colour.

== Distribution ==
Turbinaria reniformis has a very wide distribution with a range extending from the Red Sea and the Gulf of Aden, through the Indian Ocean, the central Indo-Pacific, to northern Australia, southern Japan, the South China Sea and island groups in the West and Central Pacific.

== Ecology ==
Turbinaria reniformis is a zooxanthellate coral. It lives in symbiosis with unicellular dinoflagellates known as zooxanthellae. These photosynthetic protists provide their host coral with nutrients and energy, but in order to benefit from this, the coral needs to live in relatively shallow water and in a brightly lit position. In conditions of thermal stress, the coral may expel the zooxanthellae, become bleached and ultimately die. It has been found that when the surrounding sea water is moderately enriched with nitrogen, the coral can better withstand thermal stress and retain its zooxanthellae.

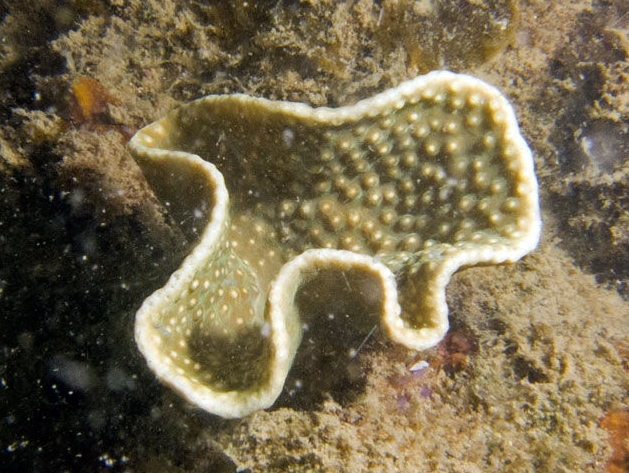
Turbinaria reniformis

T. reniformis is gonochoristic, with colonies being either male or female. Breeding takes place synchronously with all the colonies in an area liberating their gametes into the sea about a week after the full moon in November.
