= Acropora abrolhosensis =

Conservation status
- Endangered (IUCN 3.1)

Scientific classification
- Kingdom: Animalia
- Phylum: Cnidaria
- Subphylum: Anthozoa
- Class: Hexacorallia
- Order: Scleractinia
- Family: Acroporidae
- Genus: Acropora
- Species: A. abrolhosensis

Binomial name
- Acropora abrolhosensis Veron, 1985

Species of coral

Acropora abrolhosensis is a species of acroporid coral that was first described by John Veron in 1985. Found in sheltered lagoons and shallow reefs, it is listed as a endangered species on the IUCN Red List. The population of the species is decreasing, and most specimens are found in Western Australia, but occurs in many other areas. It is also listed under CITES Appendix II.

== Description ==
Acropora abrolhosensis specimens are found in tree-shaped colonies and are pink, blue, or brown, and the branch tips are pale in colour. These colonies consist of several straight branches, which have large axial corallites (at the end of each branch) and the radial corallites (up the side of each branch) contain circular openings and have swollen ends. The colonies can be over 10 m (33 ft) wide and 2 m (6.6 ft) high, and are sometimes compact. Its axial corallites are 2.5 to 3.5 millimetres (0.098 to 0.138 in) in diameter. It is similar to Acropora copiosa and Acropora loisetteae. The species is found at depths of 2 to 18 m (6.6 to 59.1 ft), and is found in enclosed sheltered lagoons and the slopes of sheltered reefs.

== Distribution ==
Acropora abrolhosensis can be found in Australian waters, the Sea of Japan, the Great Barrier Reef, the Coral Sea, the East China Sea, the Solomon Islands and the western Pacific. It is abundant at the Houtman Abrolhos Islands. It is also believed to exist at the Marshall Islands and Fiji. It is threatened by reef destruction and bleaching, and the population may be affected by the Acanthaster placini. The coral can be found at temperatures of 22.22 to 28.63 °C (72.00 to 83.53 °F).

It is classed as a vulnerable species on the IUCN Red List as the population is decreasing, and is listed under Appendix II of CITES. Its population is unknown but is likely to be threatened by the global reduction of coral reefs, the increase of temperature causing bleaching, and disease.

== Taxonomy ==
Acropora abrolhosensis was first described by John Veron in 1985 at Australian coral reefs.
