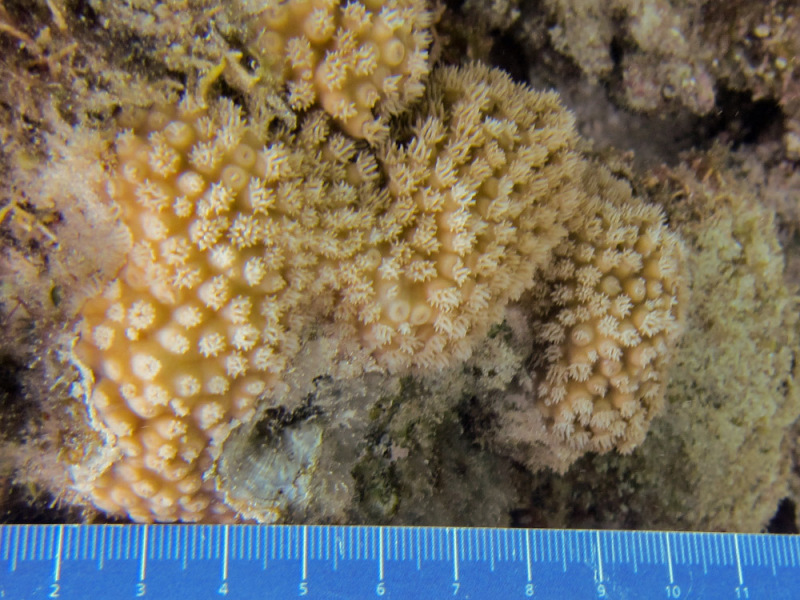
- T. stellulata

Scientific classification
- Kingdom: Animalia
- Phylum: Cnidaria
- Subphylum: Anthozoa
- Class: Hexacorallia
- Order: Scleractinia
- Family: Dendrophylliidae
- Genus: Turbinaria; Oken, 1815

Species
- See text

Synonyms
- List: Explanaria Lamarck, 1816; Gemmipora de Blainville, 1830; Turbinacis Quenstedt, 1880

= Turbinaria (coral) =

Genus of corals

Turbinaria is a genus of colonial stony corals in the family Dendrophylliidae. Common names for this genus include disc coral, scroll coral, cup coral, vase coral, pagoda coral and ruffled ridge coral. These corals are native to the Red Sea, Indian Ocean, Japan and the south Central Pacific Ocean.

== Characteristics ==
Members of this genus may be massive, laminar, columnar or foliaceous, but foliaceous is the most common form. They may form plates, discs or tiered structures, usually with the corallites (skeletal cups in which the polyps sit) only on one surface. The corallites have porous walls and may be sunk into the surrounding coenosteum (skeletal tissue), or form tubular raised mounds. The septa (vertical blades in the corallites) are short and arranged neatly and the columella (central point where the septa join) is broad. The coenosteum is dense and heavy. Most species are nocturnal, with the polyps expanding only at night, but Turbinaria peltata is an exception to this.

== Ecology ==
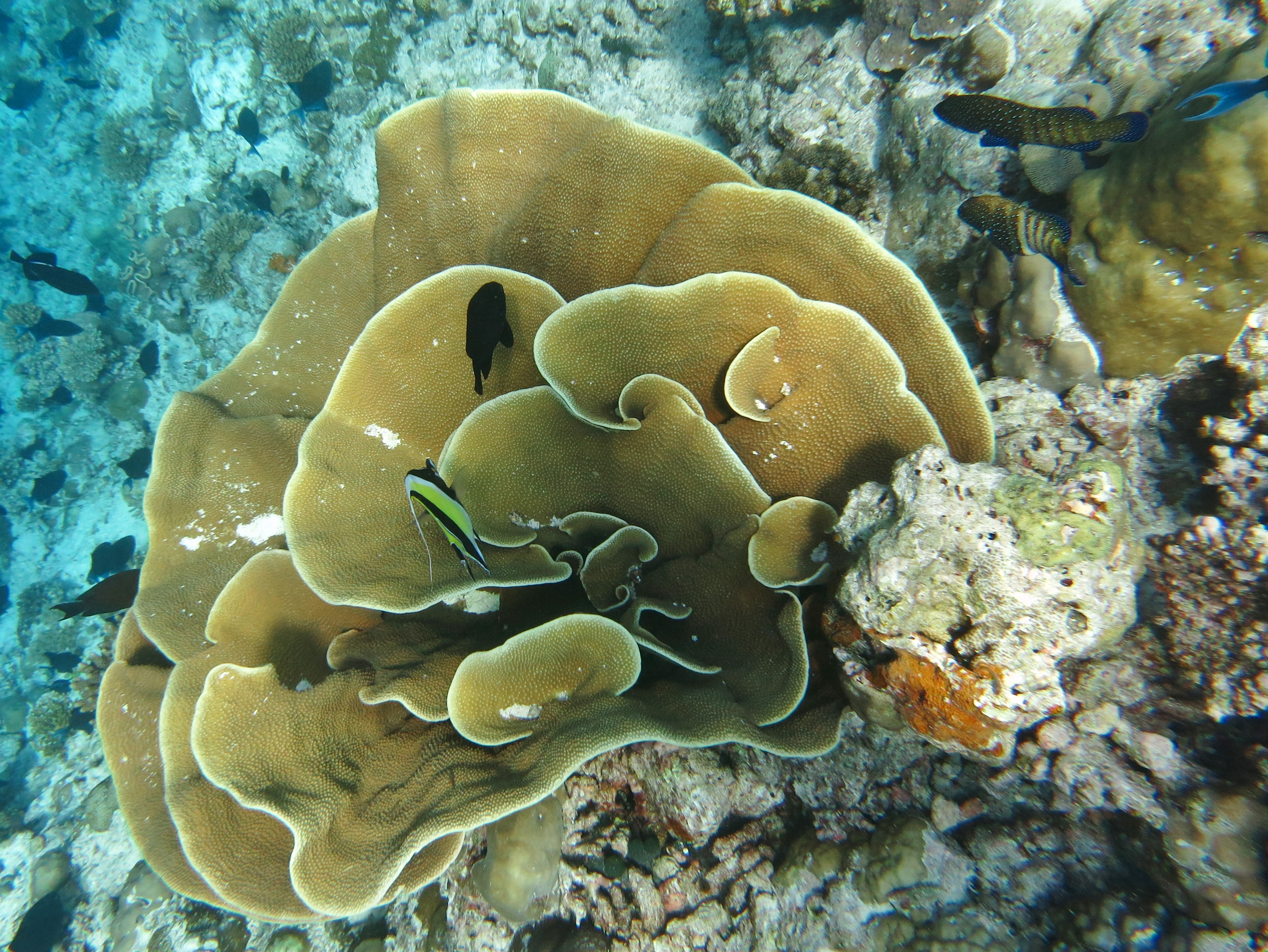
Turbinaria mesenterina

Members of this genus are hermatypic (reef-building) corals. They are zooxanthellate, meaning that they contain symbiotic photosynthetic protists in their tissues, and are found in shallow waters where sunshine penetrates. They are one of only three genera in the family Dendrophylliidae with this capability, the other genera being azooxanthellate (without zooxanthellae) and found in deeper waters.

The crown-of-thorns starfish (Acanthaster planci) has been causing much damage to many species of coral in the Indo-Pacific region but Turbinaria sp. are seldom attacked.

== Conservation status ==
The conservation status of several species in this genus is listed by the International Union for Conservation of Nature as "vulnerable". Like other corals, the main threats they face are climate change and ocean acidification. Rising sea water temperatures causes stress to the corals resulting in bleaching events and greater incidence of coral disease, and ocean acidification puts at risk their calcium carbonate skeletal structure. Storms seem to be increasing in severity and fishing activities can also damage reefs. Other threats include tourism, pollution, sedimentation and the introduction of alien species. Population trend statistics have not been gathered for individual species, but the general decline in coral reef habitat is used as a proxy for population decline in these corals.

== Use in aquaria ==
Turbinaria spp. are sometimes kept in reef aquaria. They are hardy corals that are non-aggressive, and do best in well-lit conditions with moderate to high water movement.

== Species ==
The following species are listed by the World Register of Marine Species:

- Turbinaria bifrons Brüggemann, 1877
- Turbinaria carcarensis Nemenzo, 1971
- Turbinaria conspicua Bernard, 1896
- Turbinaria cyathiformis† Blainville, 1830
- Turbinaria cylindrica Nemenzo, 1960
- Turbinaria disparata Nemenzo, 1980
- Turbinaria eminens Nemenzo, 1971
- Turbinaria frondens (Dana, 1846)
- Turbinaria heronensis Wells, 1958
- Turbinaria irregularis Bernard, 1896
- Turbinaria mesenterina (Lamarck, 1816)
- Turbinaria nitida Nemenzo, 1960
- Turbinaria patula (Dana, 1846)
- Turbinaria peltata (Esper, 1794)
- Turbinaria radicalis Bernard, 1896
- Turbinaria reniformis Bernard, 1896
- Turbinaria stellulata (Lamarck, 1816)
