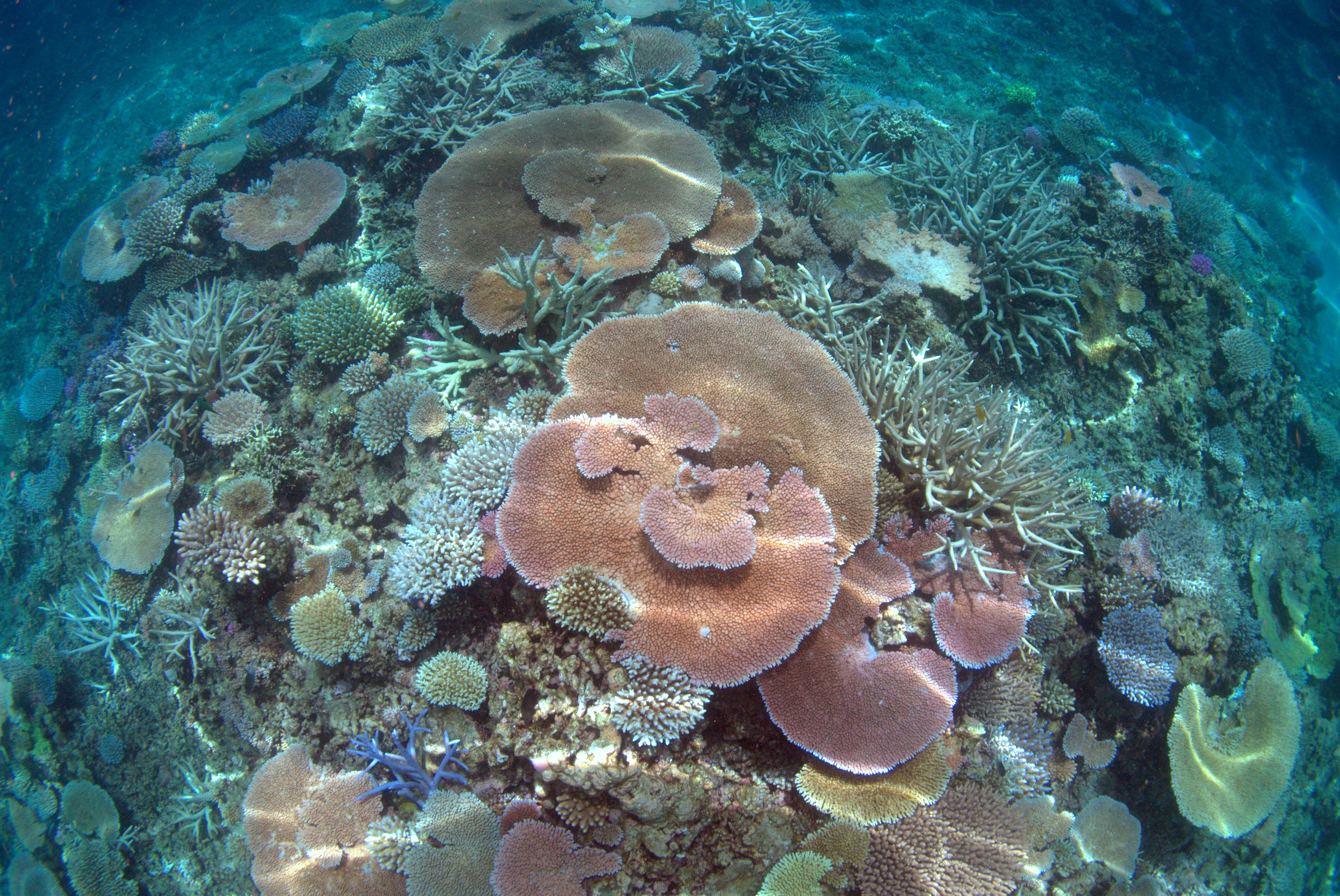
- Lodestone Reef, Queensland

Conservation status
- Endangered (IUCN 3.1)

Scientific classification
- Kingdom: Animalia
- Phylum: Cnidaria
- Subphylum: Anthozoa
- Class: Hexacorallia
- Order: Scleractinia
- Family: Acroporidae
- Genus: Acropora
- Species: A. hyacinthus

Binomial name
- Acropora hyacinthus (Dana, 1846)

Synonyms
- List: Madrepora hyacinthus Dana, 1846

= Acropora hyacinthus =

Species of coral

Acropora hyacinthus is a species of Acropora described from a specimen collected in Fiji by James Dwight Dana in 1846. It was thought to have a range that includes the Indian Ocean, the Indo-Pacific waters, southeast Asia, Japan, the East China Sea and the western Pacific Ocean, but has recently been shown to be restricted to the central pacific and the Australian east coast. It lives on shallow reefs on upper reef slopes, and is found from depths of 1–25 metres (3.3–82.0 ft). Crown-of-thorns starfish preferentially prey upon Acropora corals.

== Description ==
Acropora hyacinthus occurs in plate- or table-shaped wide colonies that consist of a number of thin branches in a lattice structure. It has strongly inclined branchlets. A. hyacinthus has axial dominant branches, each branch has a large dominant axial corallite with much smaller cup-shaped radial corallites. The corallites on specimens of A. hyacinthus are often darker than the main branch structure. The species looks similar to many tabular Acropora species and is often misidentified in the field.

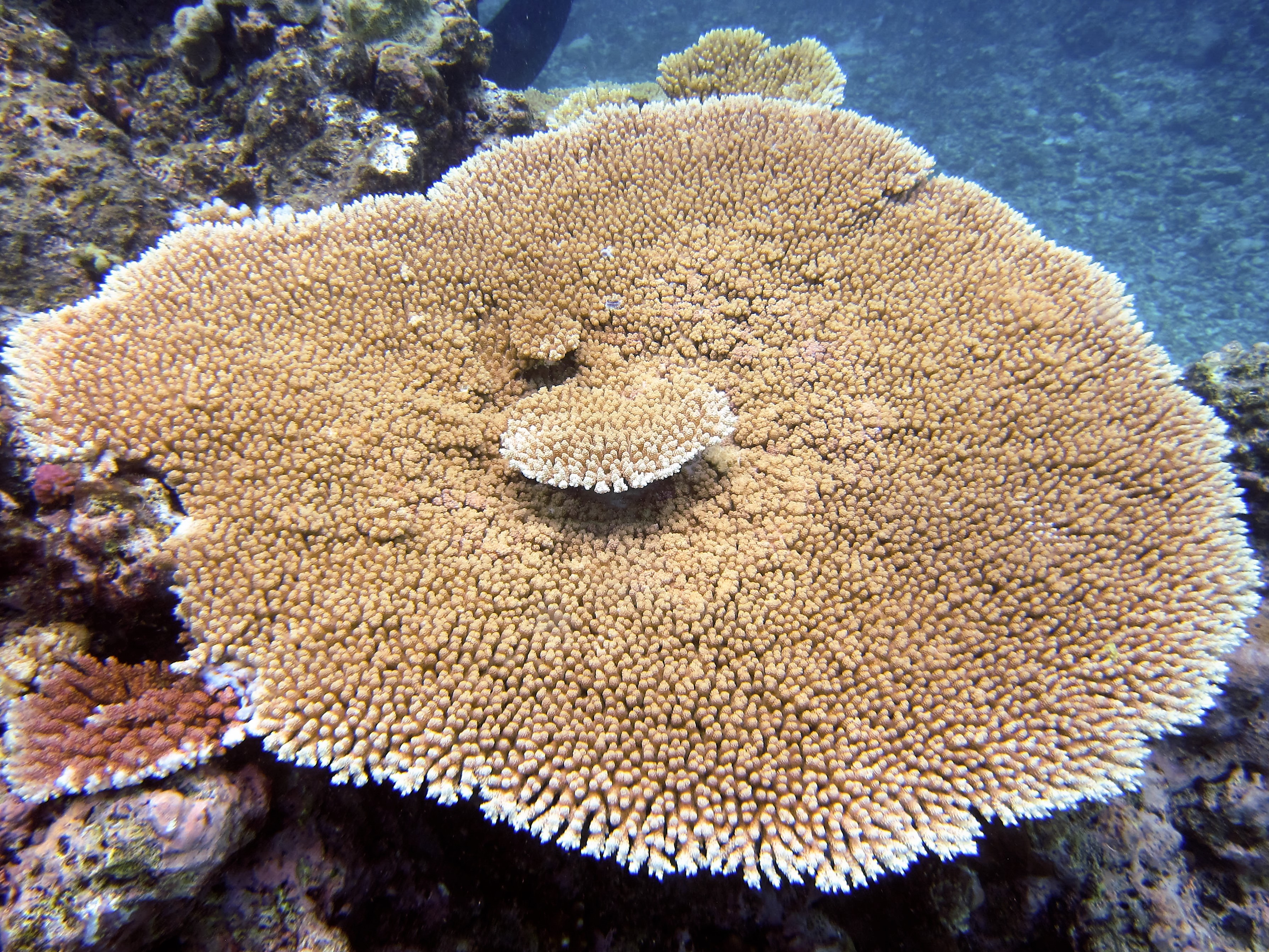

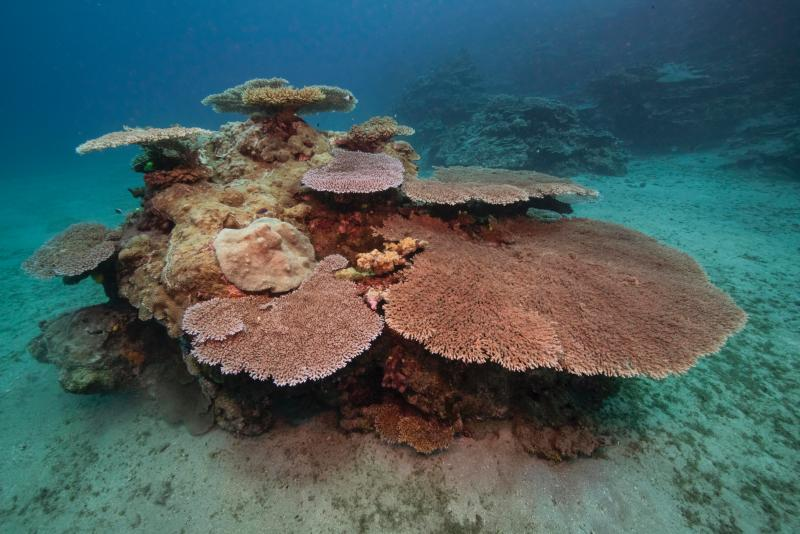

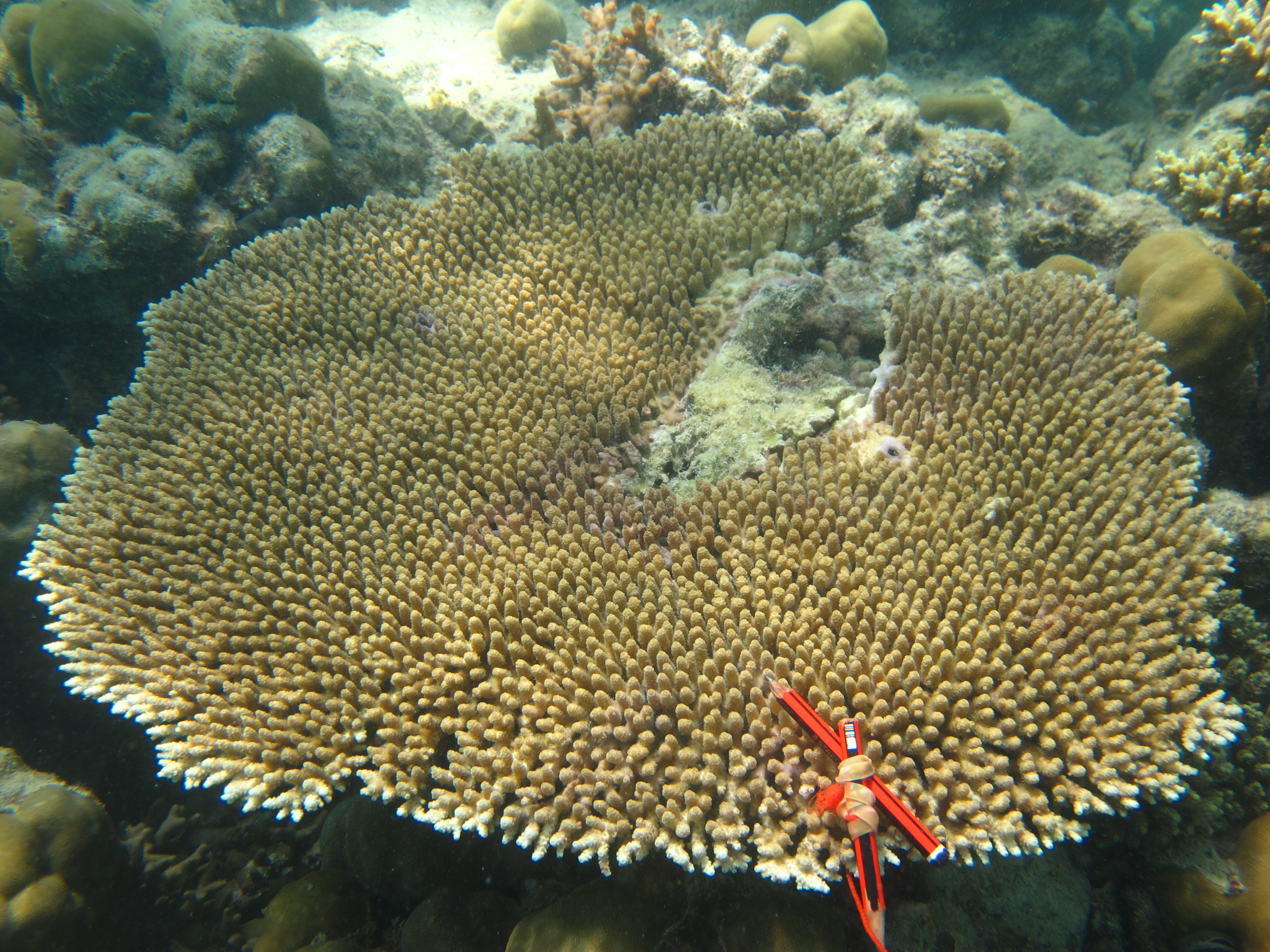

== Growth rate ==
Branching corals of the genus Acropora are among the fastest-growing taxa on most coral reefs. A. hyacinthus has an average growth rate that ranges from 3–10 centimetres (1.2–3.9 in) diameter increase per year, with much of this variation thought to be a response to temperature, in addition to competition and other abiotic and biotic factors.

== Distribution ==
It occurs in the Central-Pacific and the Australian east coast. Like most corals, Acropora hyacinthus is classed as a data deficient species on the IUCN Red List, but it is believed that its population is decreasing in line with the global decline in reefs, and it is listed under Appendix II of CITES. Figures of its population are unknown, but is likely to be threatened by the global reduction of coral reefs, the increase of temperature causing coral bleaching, climate change, human activity, the crown-of-thorns starfish (Acanthaster planci) and disease. It occurs at depths from 1 to 25 metres (3 ft 3 in to 82 ft 0 in) on the upper slopes of shallow reefs.

== Taxonomy ==
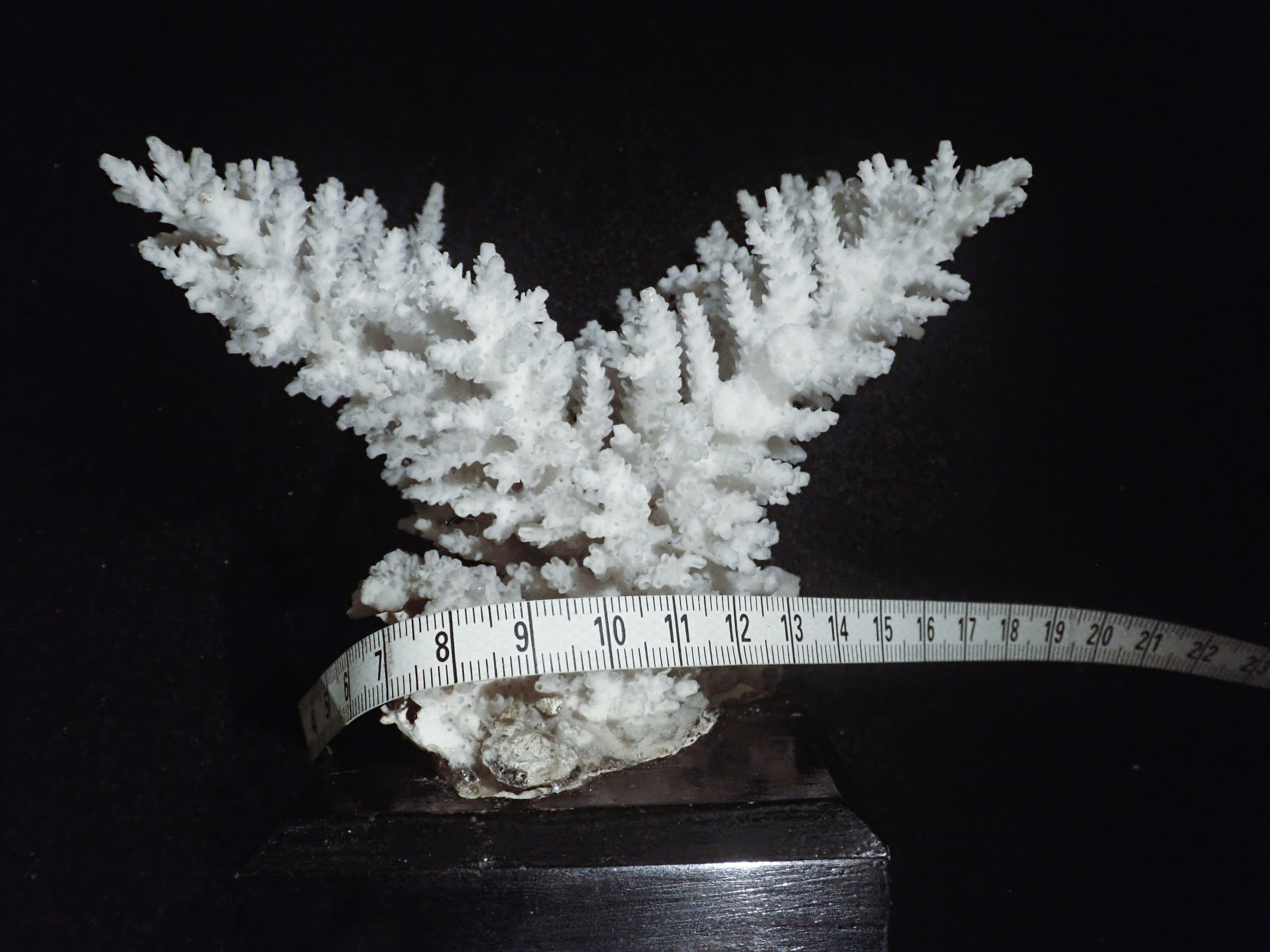
Holotype of Madrepora hyacinthus Dana 1846

The species was originally described by James Dwight Dana in 1846 as Madrepora hyacinthus Dana, 1846 from a sample collected in Fiji during the U.S.S Exploring Expedition. In 2025 this species was shown to represent multiple distinct species from across the Indo-Pacific. Morphological comparisons of type material and molecular data indicate that A. hyacinthus is likely restricted to the south and south-western Pacific, and does not occur in the Indian Ocean or Red Sea. Several species previously treated as synonyms—including A. sinensis, A. flabelliformis, A. turbinata, A. conferta, A. pectinata, A. bifurcata, A. patella, A. surculosa, and A. recumbens—have been reinstated as distinct taxa pending further study.
