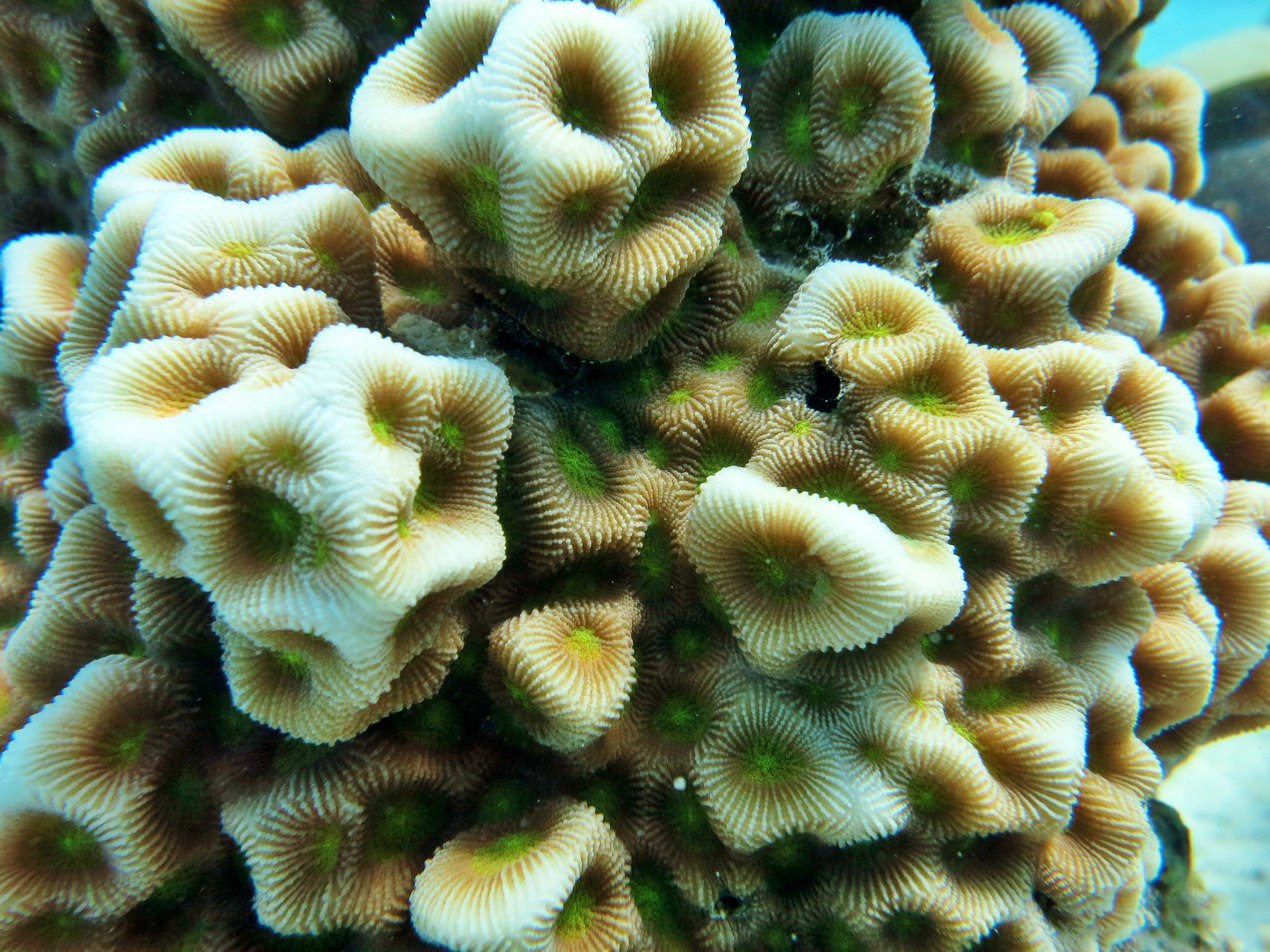

Conservation status
- Least Concern (IUCN 3.1)

Scientific classification
- Kingdom: Animalia
- Phylum: Cnidaria
- Subphylum: Anthozoa
- Class: Hexacorallia
- Order: Scleractinia
- Family: Merulinidae
- Genus: Favites
- Species: F. halicora

Binomial name
- Favites halicora (Ehrenberg, 1834)

= Favites halicora =

Species of coral

Favites halicora is a species of coral belonging to the family Merulinidae. The species was first described in 1834 by Christian Gottfried Ehrenberg as Astraea halicora.

The species is found in Indian and Pacific Ocean.
