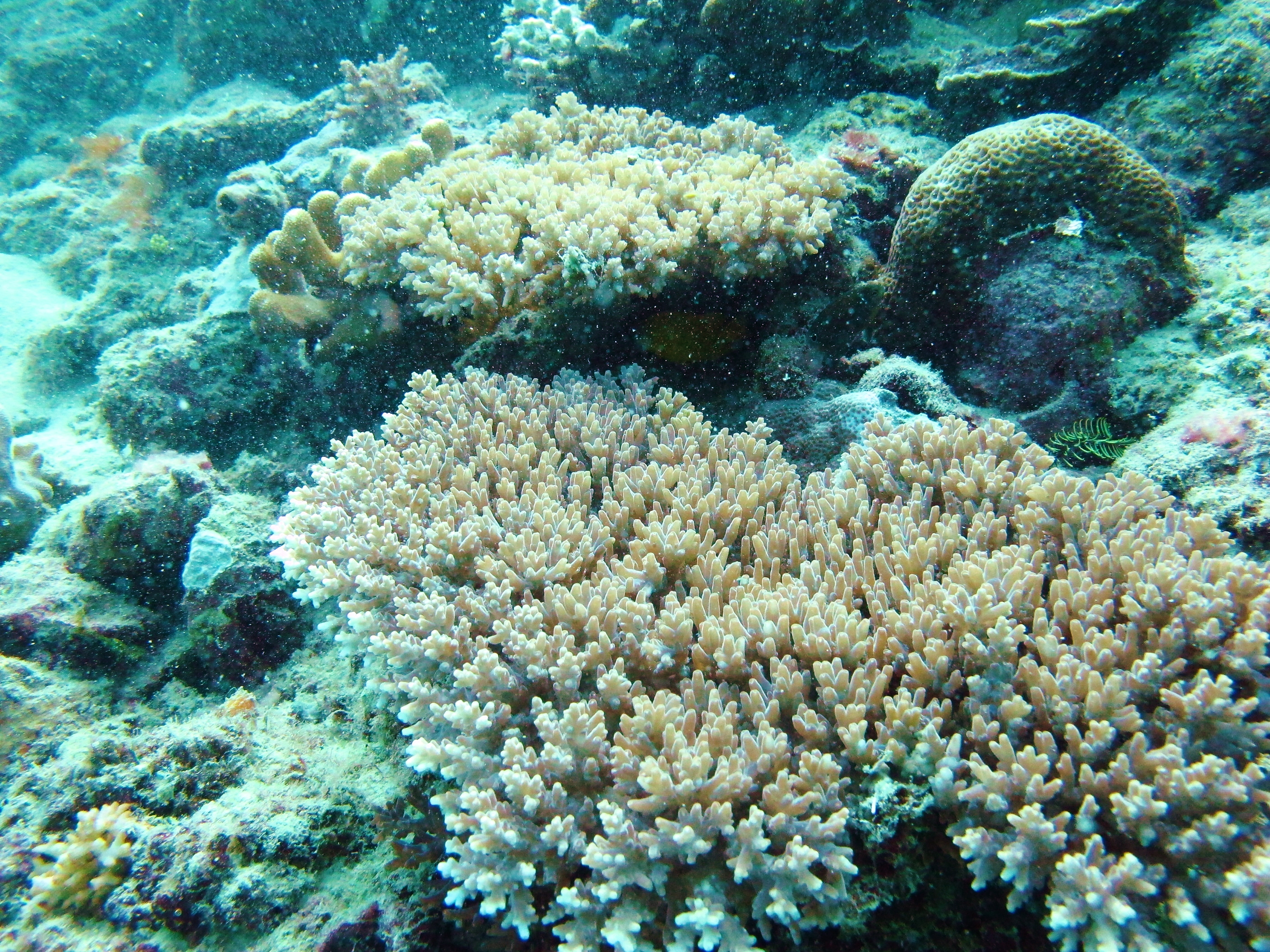

Conservation status
- Vulnerable (IUCN 3.1)

Scientific classification
- Kingdom: Animalia
- Phylum: Cnidaria
- Subphylum: Anthozoa
- Class: Hexacorallia
- Order: Scleractinia
- Family: Acroporidae
- Genus: Acropora
- Species: A. granulosa

Binomial name
- Acropora granulosa (Milne Edwards, 1860)

Synonyms
- Madrepora clavigera Brook, 1892; Madrepora granulosa Milne Edwards, 1860

= Acropora granulosa =

Species of coral

Acropora granulosa is a species of acroporid coral found in the northern and southwest Indian Ocean, the Red Sea, Australia, the East China Sea, Japan, the oceanic central and western Pacific Ocean, and the central Indo-Pacific. It occurs in tropical shallow reefs, from depths of between 8 and 40 metres (26 and 131 ft). It was described by Milne Edwards in 1860 and is classified as a vulnerable species by the IUCN.

== Description ==
It is found in colonies composed of a single horizontal plate of branches with a diameter below 1 metre (39 in). Branches are evenly spaced and branchlets are short and inclined. Each branchlet has at least one incipient axial and axial corallite, and its small radial corallites are pocket-shaped. There are no known similar-looking species, and it is mostly pale blue, cream or grey in colour.

== Distribution ==
It is classed as a vulnerable species on the IUCN Red List and it is believed that its population is decreasing; the species is listed under Appendix II of CITES. Figures of its population are unknown, but is likely to be threatened by the global reduction of coral reefs, the increase of temperature causing coral bleaching, climate change, human activity, the crown-of-thorns starfish (Acanthaster planci) and disease. It occurs in the northern and southwest Indian Ocean, the Red Sea, Australia, the East China Sea, Japan, the oceanic central and western Pacific Ocean, and the central Indo-Pacific. It is found at depths of between 8 and 40 metres (26 and 131 ft) in tropical shallow reefs.

== Taxonomy ==
It was described as Madrepora granulosa by Milne Edwards in 1860.
