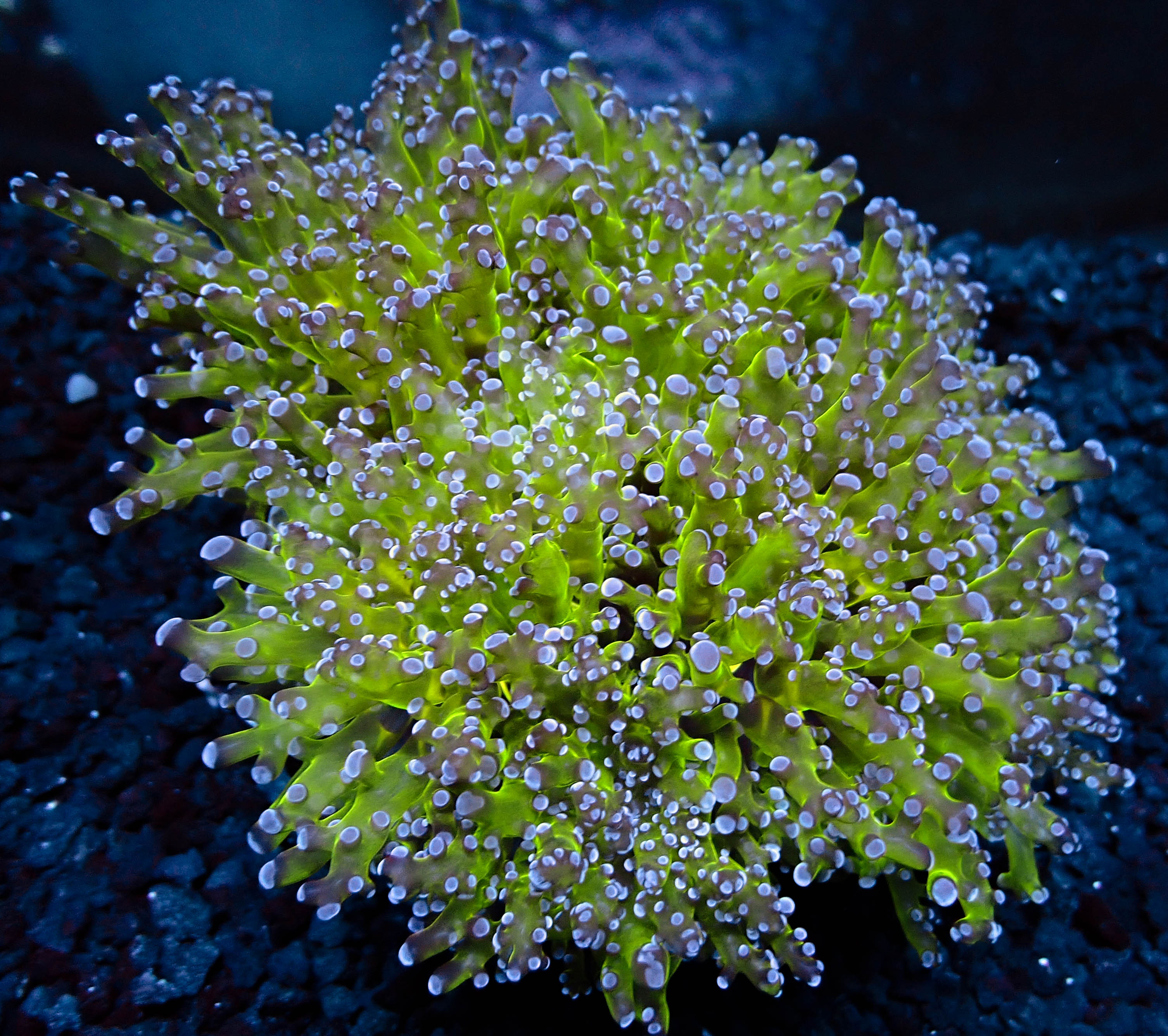

Conservation status
- Vulnerable (IUCN 3.1)

Scientific classification
- Kingdom: Animalia
- Phylum: Cnidaria
- Subphylum: Anthozoa
- Class: Hexacorallia
- Order: Scleractinia
- Family: Acroporidae
- Genus: Acropora
- Species: A. horrida

Binomial name
- Acropora horrida (Dana, 1846)

Synonyms
- List: Acropora parilis (Quelch, 1886); Acropora sekiseiensis Veron, 1990; Acropora tylostoma (Ehrenberg, 1834); Heteropora tylostoma Ehrenberg, 1834; Madrepora angulata Quelch, 1886; Madrepora horrida Dana, 1846; Madrepora inermis Brook, 1891; Madrepora parilis Quelch, 1886; Madrepora tylostoma (Ehrenberg, 1834)

= Acropora horrida =

Species of coral

Acropora horrida is a species of acroporid coral that was first described by James Dwight Dana in 1846. Found in tropical, shallow reefs in marine environments, it occurs near fringing reefs around turbid water, at depths of 5 to 20 m (16 to 66 ft). It is listed as a vulnerable species on the IUCN Red List, and it is thought to have a decreasing population. It is not common and found over a large area, and is listed under CITES Appendix II.

== Description ==
Acropora horrida forms in colonies, which are mainly open branched. It is light blue, dark blue, light yellow, or brown in colour, with white or pale blue polyps. The main branches contain an unorganised structure of branchlets, based on examples in water showing turbidity. However, in clear water, the branchlets are short, making the structure appear bristly. The corallites are rough and irregularly placed, and tentacles enlarge during the day. There are no similar species within genus Acropora. It is found in marine, tropical, shallow reefs, mainly in turbid water near fringing reefs. It also occurs in shallow lagoons and sand slopes, and is found at depths of between 5 and 20 m (16 and 66 ft). It is believed to survive for more than ten years, and reaches maturity at between three and eight. It is composed of aragonite (calcium carbonate).

== Distribution ==
Acropora horrida occurs over a large area but is not common; the Red Sea, the Indian Ocean, the Gulf of Aden, the Persian Gulf, the Indo-Pacific, the East China Sea, Japan, and Southeast Asia, the Line Islands, Indonesia, and Palau. Recently, numbers for the species have declined in the Great Barrier Reef, Papua New Guinea, Kimbe Bay, and Orpheus Island. There is no specific population data for this species, but numbers have been observed to be declining in some locations, and are believed to be decreasing in others. It is not very resistant to disease and bleaching by sea temperature increases, and is affected by being prey to Acanthaster planci, climate change, fishing, human activity and industry, and pollution. It exists in temperatures between 25.48 and 28.54 °C (77.86 and 83.37 °F), and first appeared between 5.33 and 2.59 myr ago. It is listed as a vulnerable species on the IUCN Red List, and is also listed under CITES Appendix II.

== Taxonomy ==
It was first described by James Dwight Dana in 1846 as Madrepora horrida in Fiji.
