= Zooxanthellae =

Dinoflagellates in symbiosis with coral, jellyfish and nudibranchs

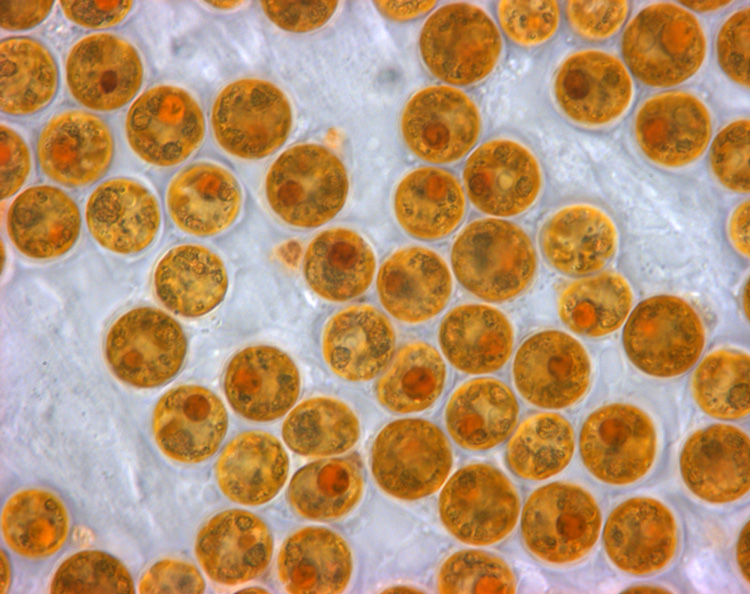
Yellow-brown zooxanthellae

Zooxanthellae (/ˌzoʊəzænˈθɛliː/; sing. zooxanthella) is a colloquial term for photosynthetic single-celled organisms capable of symbiosis with diverse marine invertebrates such as corals, jellyfish, demosponges, and nudibranchs. Most known zooxanthellae are in the dinoflagellate genus Symbiodinium, but some are known from the genus Amphidinium, and other taxa, as yet unidentified, may have similar endosymbiont affinities. The genus name "Zooxanthella" (meaning literally "little yellow animal") was originally given by Karl Brandt in 1881 to Zooxanthella nutricula (a mutualist of the radiolarian Collozoum inerme) which has been placed in the Peridiniales. (Note: Brandt proposed Zooxanthella to include one species, Zooxanthella nutricula. The genus name has long been understood to be problematic due to confusion with the term "zooxanthellae" (singular "zooxanthella"), but proposals to ditch this name have failed. Under a not widely-used argument by Guiry & Anderson 2018, Zooxanthella should be treated as the earliest generic name for Symbiodinium sensu lato. Guiry did not cite the Peridiniales work by Gottschling.) Another group of unicellular eukaryotes that partake in similar endosymbiotic relationships in both marine and freshwater habitats are green algae zoochlorellae.

Zooxanthellae are photoautotrophs that contain chlorophyll a and chlorophyll c, as well as the dinoflagellate pigments peridinin and diadinoxanthin, which give the yellowish and brownish colours typical of many of the host species. During the day, they provide their host with organic products of photosynthesis, sometimes providing up to 90% of the host's energy needs for metabolism, growth and reproduction. In return, they receive nutrients, carbon dioxide, and an elevated position with access to sunlight.

== Morphology and classification ==
Zooxanthellae can be grouped in the classes of Bacillariophyceae, Cryptophyceae, Dinophyceae, and Rhodophycaeae and of the genera Amphidinium, Gymnodinium, Aureodinium, Gyrodinium, Prorocentrum, Scrippsiella, Gloeodinium, and most commonly, Symbiodinium. Zooxanthellae of genus Symbiodinium belong to a total of eight phylogenetic clades A-H, differentiated via their nuclear ribosomal DNA and chloroplast DNA.

Zooxanthellae are autotrophs containing chloroplasts composed of thylakoids present in clusters of three. A pyrenoid protrudes from each chloroplast and is encased along with the chloroplast by a thick, starchy covering. Within the cell's cytoplasm also exists lipid vacuoles, calcium oxalate crystals, dictyosomes, and mitochondria. The cell wall of zooxanthellae varies in structure across species. One structure consists of an outer membrane, middle layer compact with electrons, and a thin inner layer. In other species, the characteristics of this low-density inner layer make up the cell wall's entire structure. Beneath the cell wall is the cell membrane, and beneath the cell membrane are thecal vesicles.

DNA in the cell exists in the form of chromatin coils tightly compacted together. It is condensed in the nucleus alongside an atypical histone complement. The DNA possesses ribosomal RNA (rRNA) that is folded and of similar morphology to rRNA in archaeobacteria. This indicates that RNA is important for DNA packaging in zooxanthellae. Zooxanthellae, in addition to all other dinoflagellates, possess 5-hydroxymethyluracil and thymidine in their genomes, unlike any other eukaryotic genome.

Zooxanthellae as symbionts originated evolutionarily when the dinoflagellate cells were taken up by host cell lysosomes. Instead of being degraded by the lysosomes, the symbiotic structures were able to coexist because they provided a source of carbon compounds to the host cell.

== Life history ==
Zooxanthellae alternate between life phases expressed as cysts and as motile organisms in the water column. In zooxanthellae of the genus Gymnodinium, one possible life cycle of the cell begins as an immature cyst which reaches maturity then divides to form an immature cyst once more. Once growing into an older cell, it becomes no longer useful. In the life cycle of a motile zooxanthellae cell, its youngest stage is known as a zoosporangium, which matures into a zoospore capable of motility. This motile cell produces and releases gametes for reproduction.

=== Vegetative phase ===
The vegetative phase in the life cycle of a zooxanthellae is the predominant form of the organism. In this form, the single-celled organism has a thin cell wall. As opposed to the zoospore, the zooxanthellae contains numerous chloroplasts. Once the cell continues growing, however, chloroplasts decrease in abundance. The vegetative cell will either divide into two separate daughter cells or transition into a cyst stage.

=== Cyst stages ===
The most common phases in the life history of zooxanthellae following the vegetative phase are cysts, dividing cysts, and degenerate cysts. Cysts possess a thick cell wall yet retain the composition of the cytoplasm and constitute the majority of clustered zooxanthellae in host tissues. This stage of the cell provides the host with a reddish-brown hue. Dividing cysts make up a fourth of the composition of zooxanthellae clusters in host tissues and are expressed as cell stages where two daughter cells remain adjoined but possess individual cell walls. Degenerate cysts are present in clusters, though rare, and lose much of their mutualistic benefit to the host they reside in due to a decrease in photosynthetic efficiency. The young zoosporangium and motile zoospore stages, though seen in zooxanthellae life cycles, are much rarer amongst clades. The zoospore resides in the zoosporangium until the cell wall of the cyst bursts. Zooxanthellae is only motile if it originates as a zoospore.

=== Motility ===
Zooxanthellae in the zoospore stage exhibit motility as forward movement or gyratory movement. In moving forward, the organism rotates on the posterior flagellum's axis whilst simultaneously propelling through the water column. The zoospore gyrates through the water column via attachment of the posterior flagellum to a substrate.

== Ecology ==
=== Endosymbiont acquisition ===
Zooxanthellae are particularly associated with reef-building corals but they also inhabit other invertebrates and protists; their hosts include many sea anemones, jellyfish, nudibranchs, certain bivalve molluscs like the giant clam Tridacna, sponges and flatworms as well as some species of radiolarians and foraminiferans. Many different species of zooxanthellae are present in host organisms, each species with its own adaptive capabilities and degree of tolerance of varying environmental factors.

A juvenile organism or newly established colony can acquire its zooxanthellae via sexual reproduction or directly from the environment. The egg from which the individual developed may have already been infected by zooxanthellae at the time of fertilization, or cells of the symbiont may have been transferred from the mother in a period during which the larva was brooded by its parent. Alternatively, the new individual may acquire the zooxanthellae direct from sea water in which the dinoflagellates freely live at some stages of their life cycle. Some stony corals use chemotaxis, with infection occurring as a result of the emission by the coral of a chemical attractant. Infection may also occur after ingestion of infected faecal matter by the host, or of prey that already houses the symbionts. Such indirect acquisition can result in the new host being infected by a species of zooxanthella different from that present in its parent.

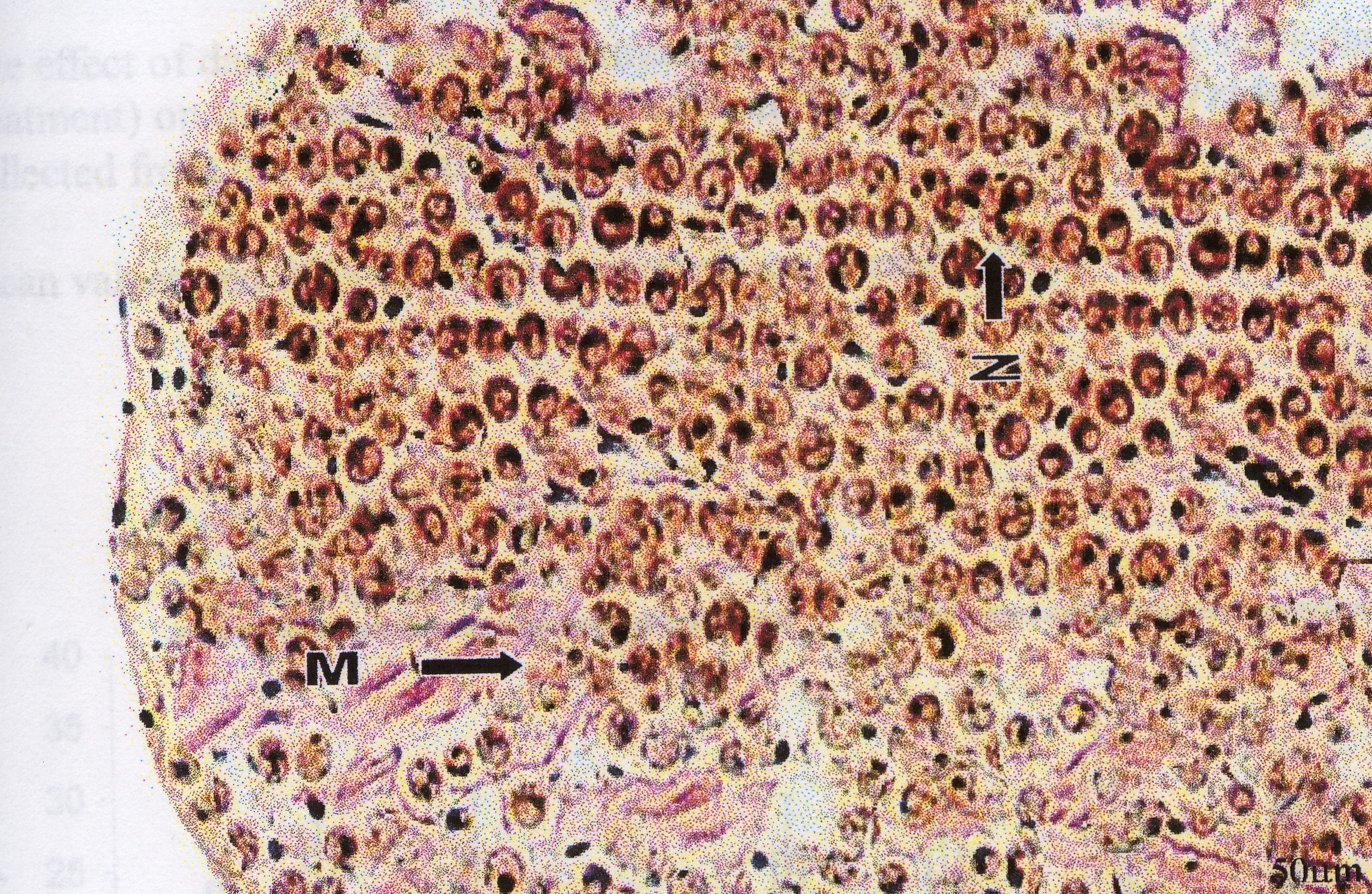
Cross section of the mantle tissue of a giant clam showing the symbiotic protozoa

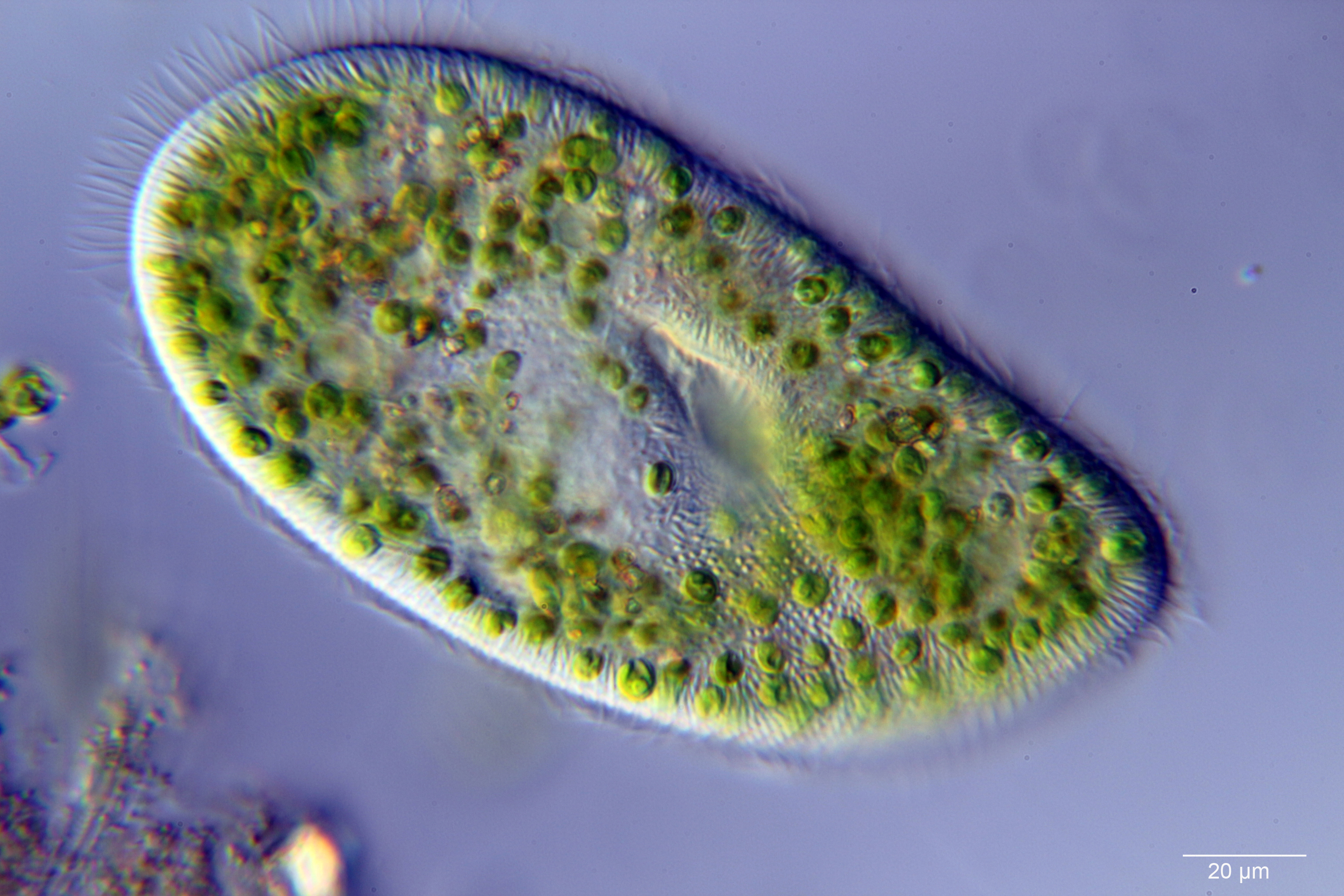
A ciliate with green zoochlorellae living inside it endosymbiotically

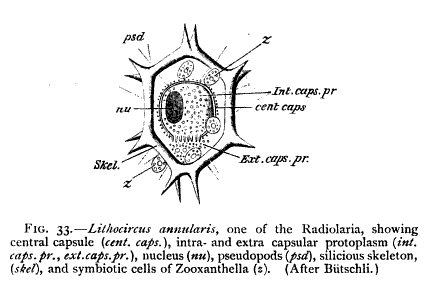
Diagram of radiolarian containing zooxanthellae (z)

=== Symbiosis with coral ===
A zooxanthellae in symbiosis with coral is contained in vacuoles of the host's gastrodermal cells and is of the genus Symbiodinium. Zooxanthellae provide nutrients to their host cnidarians in the form of sugars, glycerol, and amino acids and in return gain carbon dioxide, phosphates, and nitrogen compounds. A coral exposed to environmental stressors can result in expulsion of zooxanthellae from host tissues. This in turn strips the coral of its color, in this phenomenon known as coral bleaching, where the now-transparent tissues of the coral reveal its white internal skeletal structure. Variations in salinity, light intensity, temperature, pollution, sedimentation, and disease can all impact the photosynthetic efficiency of zooxanthellae or result in expulsion from their mutualistic relationships. In addition, increased atmospheric carbon dioxide leads to ocean acidification, which can reduce coral calcification rates and further reduce the coral-zooxanthellae symbiosis.

The physiological mechanisms behind endosymbiont expulsion remain under research but are speculated to involve various means of detachment of zooxanthellae or gastrodermal cells from host corals. During a bleaching event, entire gastrodermal cells containing zooxanthellae may leave the host. In other cases, gastrodermal cells will remain in the host tissues, but zooxanthellae contained in vacuoles may separately undergo damage or may physically leave the cells and enter the surrounding environment.

=== Clams and Zooxanthellae ===
Coral is not the only aquatic organism to be affected by bleaching and the expulsion of zooxanthellae; clams have also been found to undergo a similar process when temperatures become too high. However, clams discard zooxanthellae that are still alive and have been observed being able to recover them. This not only has positive indications for the clams themselves, but also the surrounding ecosystem. For many organisms, clams are a vital part of the food chain. Not only can they themselves be eaten, but excrement from giant clams contains live zooxanthellae. Opportunistic feeders and clams alike use excreted zooxanthellae as a nutrient source. The consumption of zooxanthellae is especially vital for a clam in its veliger stage as it encourages growth. Zooxanthellae are not only found in clam excrement, but in the mantle tissue as well where they take up ammonia and nitrate. They are also found in the eyes of clams like Tridacna where they act as a lens. Different clades of zooxanthellae have an impact on clam morphology. Clade E1 of zooxanthellae seems to influence or favor smaller offspring from clams when compared to clams harboring other clades and all five clades appear to be needed in order for larval settlement to occur.

=== Jellyfish and Zooxanthellae ===
Jellyfish and zooxanthellae have a history together in the scientific world as Symbiodinium was first cultured from the jellyfish Cassiopea, a model jellyfish species. Many different types of zooxanthellae have been observed forming relationships with jellyfish across many different phylogenetic branches, and the roles they play will change throughout the jellyfish's life cycle. However, as the jellyfishes ages, the diversity of zooxanthellae attaching to them decreases, suggesting that zooxanthellae compete with each other to form relationships with the jellyfish. Not all jellyfish form relationships with these microbes and for the most part the ones that do are found in tropic and subtropic waters. The relationship between jellyfish and zooxanthellae is affected a little differently than coral in terms of climate change despite both of them being a part of the cnidaria family. One study suggested that certain species of jellyfish and their symbiotic zooxanthellae may have some type of resistance to decreasing pH caused by climate change to a certain point. Although, jellyfish bleaching events have been documented during extreme heat events. While the causal factors that normally seem to affect the relationship between zooxanthellae and their host may not apply to jellyfish, light intensity does. Light availability can affect the lipid production of zooxanthellae that the jellyfish then utilize. To maximize their light uptake, jellyfish will both swim near the surface and do very specific migrations. The migration patterns also assist with helping the zooxanthellae access specific nutrients. Many of these jellyfish appear to be mixotrophic consuming both live prey and utilizing phototrophy. This may be what helps jellyfish survive climate change and bleaching as they could switch feeding methods rather than attempting to recover lost zooxanthellae quickly. There are many unknowns in when it comes to the relationship between zooxanthellae and jellyfish that scientists look to answer.
