= Lesser star coral =

Lesser star coral may refer to two different species of coral:

- Goniastrea favulus, a species of coral in the family Merulinidae
- Paragoniastrea australensis, a species of coral in the family Merulinidae
