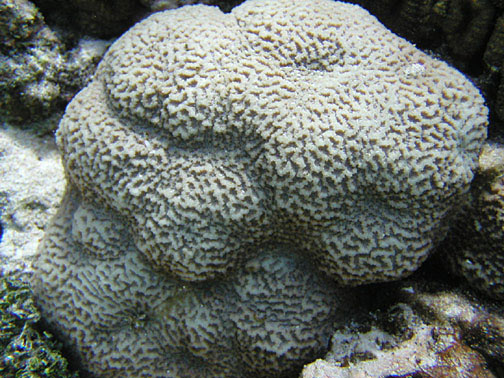

Conservation status
- Least Concern (IUCN 3.1)

Scientific classification
- Kingdom: Animalia
- Phylum: Cnidaria
- Subphylum: Anthozoa
- Class: Hexacorallia
- Order: Scleractinia
- Family: Merulinidae
- Genus: Platygyra
- Species: P. contorta

Binomial name
- Platygyra contorta Veron, 1990

= Platygyra contorta =

Species of coral

Platygyra contorta is a species of colonial stony coral in the family Merulinidae. It was described by John Veron in 1990. It is found at depths of 2 to 20 metres (7 to 66 ft) and its colonies are over 1 metre (3.3 ft) in diameter. It has been identified as a least-concern species.

== Description ==
Platygyra contorta is a colonial species found in columnar or encrusting structures. It is light yellow, green, grey, or red in colour, and it has thin walls. Its septa are non-uniform and its valleys are curved and short at the centre of colonies, becoming linear and long at the margins of colonies. Colonies have diameters often exceeding 1 metre (3.3 ft). Its valleys measure between 3.5 and 5 millimetres (0.14 and 0.20 in) in width. The species has a similar appearance to Goniastrea deformis and Platygyra verweyi.

== Distribution ==
It is found in the eastern and western Indian Ocean, and the northwestern, eastern central, and western central Pacific Ocean. In Japan, it is common near the mainland (Honshu), and is uncommon in the Ryukyu Islands. It also occurs in Australia, Vietnam, Yemen, Madagascar, Fiji, Thailand, the Marshall Islands, and East Africa. The species is found at depths of between 2 and 20 metres (7 and 66 ft) in lagoons, shallow reefs, and on rocks. Its population is thought to be decreasing and the species is threatened by climate change, the acidification of oceans, coral disease, fishing, human activities, and bleaching. The species is listed under Appendix II of CITES and has been identified as a least-concern species by the International Union for Conservation of Nature (IUCN).

== Taxonomy ==
Specimens of Platygyra contorta were studied in 1977 but identified as Platygyra rustica. It was first described by John Edward Norwood Veron in 1990.
