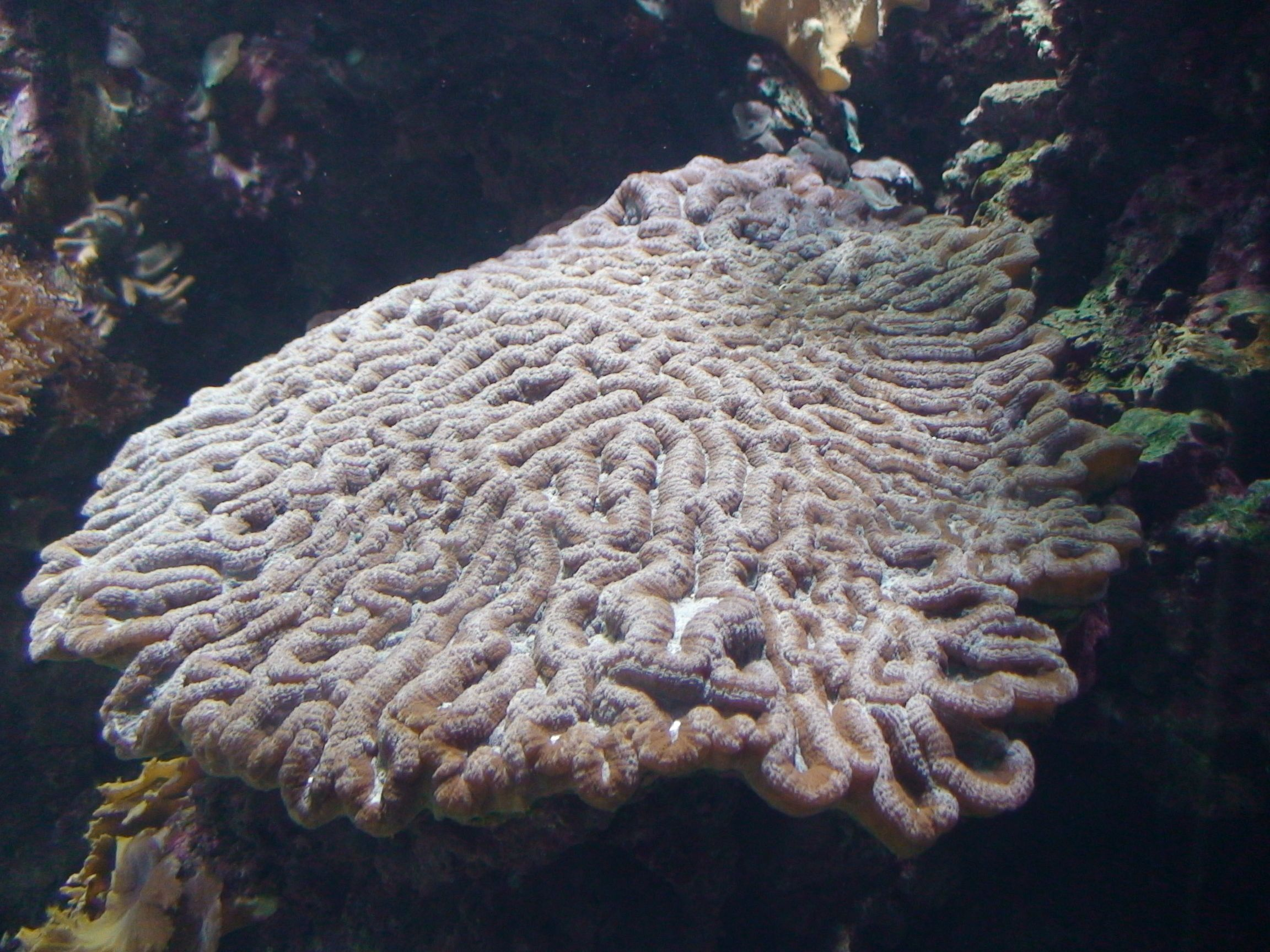

Conservation status
- Endangered (IUCN 3.1)

Scientific classification
- Kingdom: Animalia
- Phylum: Cnidaria
- Subphylum: Anthozoa
- Class: Hexacorallia
- Order: Scleractinia
- Family: Merulinidae
- Genus: Oulophyllia
- Species: O. crispa

Binomial name
- Oulophyllia crispa (Lamarck, 1816)

Synonyms
- List: Coeloria cooperi Gardiner, 1904; Coeloria gigantea Yabe & Sugiyama, 1935; Coeloria magna Gardiner, 1904; Maeandrina crispa Lamarck, 1816; Meandrina crispa Lamarck, 1816; Ulophyllia aspera Quelch, 1886; Ulophyllia bonhourei Gravier, 1910; Ulophyllia cellulosa Quelch, 1886; Ulophyllia crispa (Lamarck, 1816); Ulophyllia maxima Rehberg, 1892; Ulophyllia stokesiana Milne Edwards, 1857; Ulophyllia stuhlmanni Rehberg, 1892

= Oulophyllia crispa =

Species of coral

Oulophyllia crispa, sometimes called the intermediate valley coral, is a species of stony coral in the family Merulinidae. It is native to the tropical western and central Indo-Pacific region. Although this coral has a wide range, it is generally uncommon and seems to be decreasing in abundance, and the International Union for Conservation of Nature has rated its conservation status as being "near threatened".

== Description ==
Colonies of this coral form massive hemispherical domes, stacks or plates that can be a metre (yard) or more across, but in the Red Sea, it seldom exceeds 20 centimetres (8 in). The corallites are arranged in broad meandering valleys with acute-edged ridges separating them. The septa are thin and evenly spaced, and slope uniformly to the central columella. The polyps only expand at night; they are large and fleshy and have white-tipped tentacles. The colour of this coral is usually some shade of brown, grey or green, sometimes with contrasting oral discs. This coral is somewhat similar in appearance to Platygyra daedalea.

== Distribution and habitat ==
This coral is found in the tropical western and central Indo-Pacific region. Its range extends from the Red Sea, Gulf of Aden and East Africa to Australia, Japan, the East China Sea and the island groups of the West Pacific Ocean. It is found on reefs at depths down to about 30 metres (100 ft), mostly occurring on subtidal rocks and in lagoons.

== Ecology ==
Oulophyllia crispa is a zooxanthellate coral that has unicellular dinoflagellates embedded in its soft, transparent tissues. These use sunlight to create organic carbon molecules that the coral can use. As this coral grows, the polyps do not divide completely, resulting in several mouths being present in each large corallite. Boring sponges (Cliona spp.), polychaete worms and bivalve molluscs bore holes into colonies of this coral, causing bioerosion.
