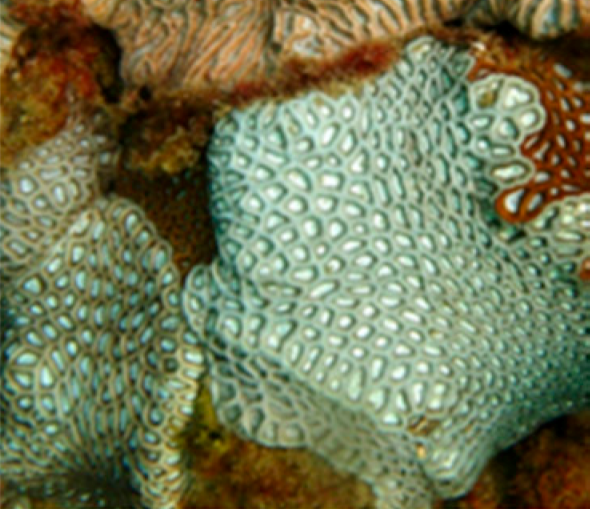
- Coelastrea aspera on Minden Reef, Australia

Conservation status
- Least Concern (IUCN 3.1)

Scientific classification
- Kingdom: Animalia
- Phylum: Cnidaria
- Subphylum: Anthozoa
- Class: Hexacorallia
- Order: Scleractinia
- Family: Merulinidae
- Genus: Coelastrea
- Species: C. aspera

Binomial name
- Coelastrea aspera (Verrill, 1866)

Synonyms
- Astraea magnifica (Dana, 1846); Favites aspera (Verrill, 1866); Goniastrea aspera Verrill, 1866; Goniastrea equisepta Nemenzo, 1959; Goniastrea incrustans Duncan, 1889; Goniastrea mantonae Crossland, 1952; Goniastrea spectabilis (Verrill, 1872); Prionastraea spectabilis Verrill, 1872

= Coelastrea aspera =

Species of stony coral

Coelastrea aspera is a species of stony coral in the family Merulinidae. It is a colonial species native to the Indo-Pacific region where it occurs in shallow water. It was first described by the American zoologist Addison Emery Verrill in 1866 as Goniastrea aspera but it has since been determined that it should be in a different genus and its scientific name has been changed to Coelastrea aspera. This is a common species throughout much of its wide range and the International Union for Conservation of Nature has rated its conservation status as being of "least concern".

== Description ==
Colonies of Coelastrea aspera are either encrusting or massive. The surface has a honeycomb-like appearance, the corallites being cerioid (several polyps sharing a common wall) in arrangement, deep and angular, with thick, straight walls. The septa are even, with long and short septa alternating in larger corallites. Budding is usually intratentacular (inside the ring of tentacles). The paliform lobes, visible through the tissues, are large and broad in protected environments but much smaller in colonies occupying exposed positions.

On intertidal flat rocks, several colonies in close proximity may form a level expanse several metres across. The general colour of this coral is usually pale brown and the oral discs may be a contrasting colour, often cream.

== Distribution ==
Coelastrea aspera is native to the Indo-Pacific region. Its range extends from Madagascar and the Red Sea, through the Indian Ocean to Australia, Indonesia, Japan and the East China Sea, and the western and central Pacific Ocean. It occurs on reef flats, on reef slopes and in lagoons, at depths down to about 15 m (49 ft).

== Ecology ==
Coelastrea aspera is a simultaneous hermaphrodite. Packets of eggs and sperm are normally released into the water column and, being buoyant, rise to the surface. Here the packets break up and cross-fertilisation can take place with gametes from different colonies intermixing. The larvae remain near the surface for a few days. In a rather different forms of sexual reproduction, it has been found that on some occasions, the eggs and developing larvae are brooded in the maternal polyps. Some individual colonies have even been seen adopting both breeding strategies at the same time in different parts of the colony.

C. aspera is a zooxanthellate coral. In its tissues it contains symbiotic unicellular photosynthetic organisms that provide nutrients and energy for the coral host. The coral in return provides a protective environment and a supply of carbon dioxide for the zooxanthellae. Under conditions of stress, usually high water temperature or excessive solar radiation, the coral expels some or all of these symbionts, a condition known as coral bleaching. In Thailand in 1995, in a reef flat dominated by C. aspera, there was a mass bleaching event caused by high water temperatures. Researchers found that the east side of each coral was bleached while the west side was unaffected. They hypothesized that the corals "remembered" a previous bleaching event caused by solar radiation and had built in some defences on the affected side. In 2000, they detached a number of colonies and rotated them through 180°, and when a further severe bleaching event occurred in 2010, the researchers took samples to assess the number of zooxanthellae present on each side of these corals and in controls. They found that the rotated corals had significantly higher levels (four times as many) of zooxanthellae in the affected areas than unrotated corals. This demonstrated that the previously affected areas had developed coping strategies and had a "memory" of at least ten years.
