= Coeloria elegans =

Scientific classification
- Domain: Eukaryota
- Kingdom: Animalia
- Phylum: Cnidaria
- Class: Hexacorallia
- Order: Scleractinia
- Family: incertae sedis
- Genus: Coeloria
- Species: C. elegans

Binomial name
- Coeloria elegans Rehberg, 1891

Species of coral

Coeloria elegans is a species of uncertain validity (taxon inquirendum) of stony corals (Scleractinia). It was first described by Hermann Rehberg in 1891, from a specimen found in Rockhampton, Queensland.
