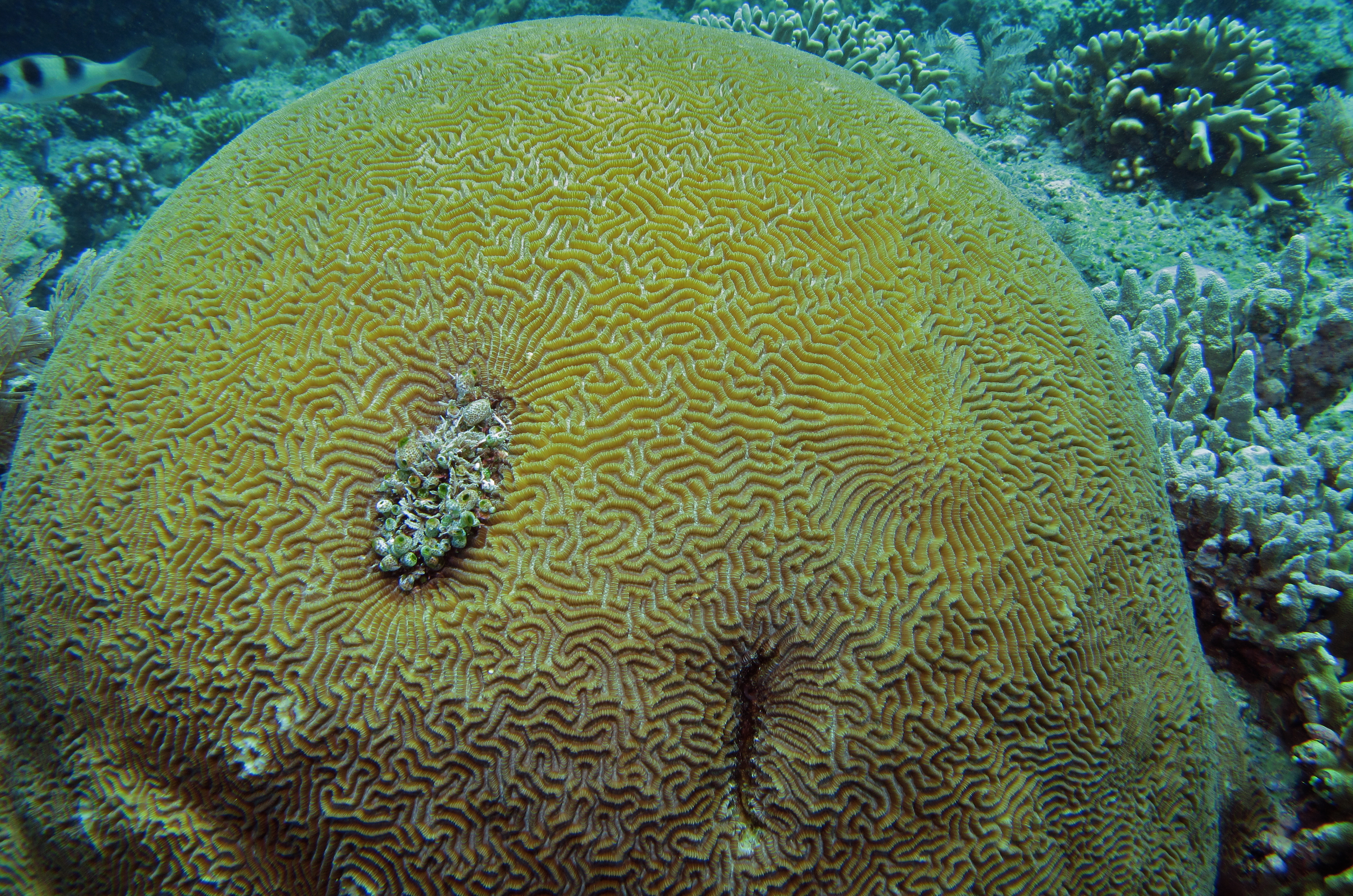

Conservation status
- Least Concern (IUCN 3.1)

Scientific classification
- Kingdom: Animalia
- Phylum: Cnidaria
- Subphylum: Anthozoa
- Class: Hexacorallia
- Order: Scleractinia
- Family: Merulinidae
- Genus: Platygyra
- Species: P. lamellina

Binomial name
- Platygyra lamellina (Ehrenberg, 1834)

Synonyms
- List: Coeloria arabica Klunzinger, 1879; Coeloria bottai Milne Edwards & Haime, 1849; Coeloria forskaliana Milne Edwards & Haime, 1849; Coeloria lamellina (Ehrenberg, 1834); Coeloria laticollis Milne Edwards & Haime, 1849; Coeloria leptoticha Klunzinger, 1879; Coeloria subdentata Milne Edwards & Haime, 1849; Maeandra lamellina Ehrenberg, 1834; Meandra lamellina Ehrenberg, 1834; Meandrina lamellina (Ehrenberg, 1834); Platygyra labyrinthica Ehrenberg, 1834

= Platygyra lamellina =

Species of coral

Platygyra lamellina, the hard brain coral, is a species of colonial stony coral in the family Merulinidae. It occurs on reefs in shallow water in the Indo-Pacific region. The International Union for Conservation of Nature has assessed its conservation status as being "near threatened".

== Description ==
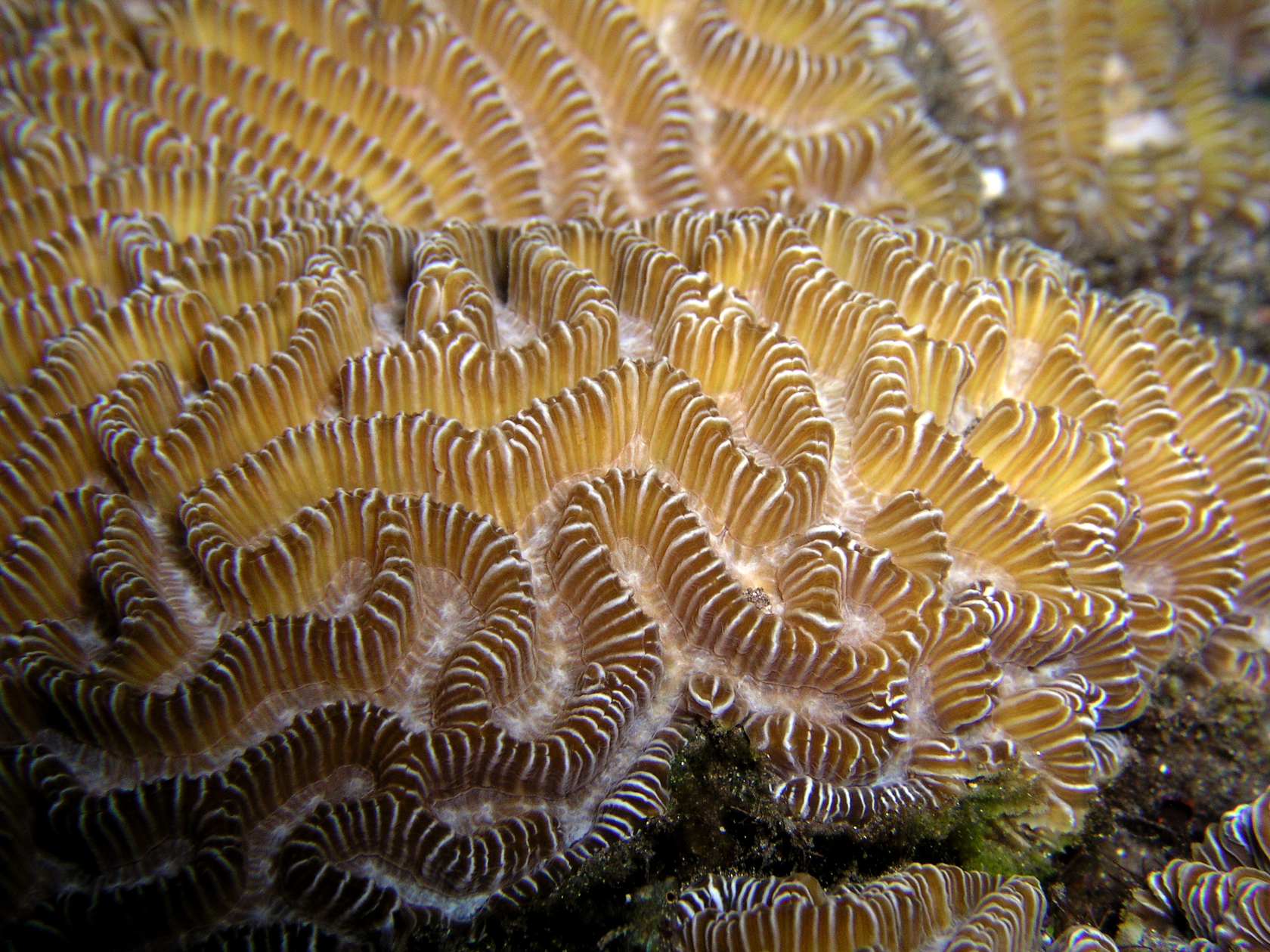
Platygyra lamellina showing meandering corallites and evenly arranged septa

Colonies of P. lamellina usually form massive rounded mounds, sometimes with nodular swellings, but may also form flat plates. The corallites are long, narrow and meandering, with thick walls which are up to one and a half times the thickness of the valleys between them. The septa protrude slightly and are rounded and even; they are very neatly arranged, and cross the valley walls. This coral is usually some shade of brown, with the valley bottoms sometimes being greenish or grey. It can be distinguished from the otherwise similar Platygyra daedalea by the thickness of the corallite walls and the more rounded septa.

== Distribution and habitat ==
P. lamellina has a widespread distribution in the Indo-Pacific region but is generally uncommon. Its range extends from Madagascar, the east coast of Africa and the Red Sea, to Australia, Indonesia, Japan and the East China Sea. It is present as part of the reef community in various habitats, particularly on back reef slopes, but also on fore reefs and in lagoons.

== Biology ==
Spawning of P. lamellina, a simultaneous hermaphrodite, occurs at night during the summer on a date determined by the phase of the moon; in the Red Sea, this is the three- to five-day period around the new moon in July and the similar period in August. Clusters of eggs and sperm are released by the corals, and these are buoyant and rise to the surface. Fertilisation takes place here at least twenty minutes later, after the eggs and sperm have dispersed. Neither the eggs nor the planula larvae, which develop about two days later, contains zooxanthellae. The planula larvae settle on the seabed about two months later and undergo metamorphosis into polyps. The slow development of the larvae is believed to be due to the absence of zooxanthellae, and these symbionts are acquired at the primary polyp stage in this species.
