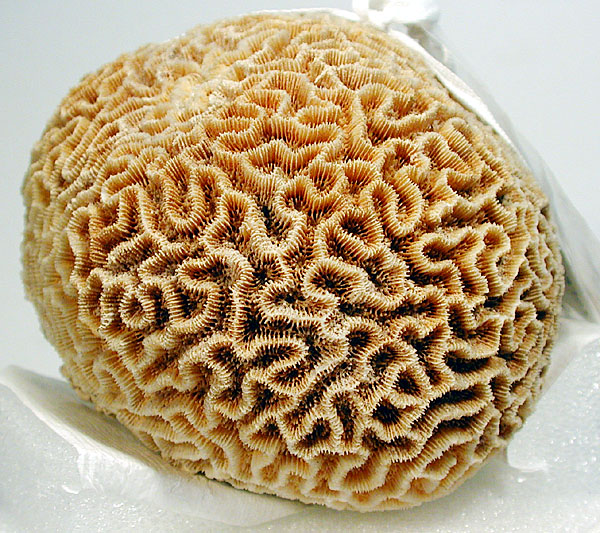
- Goniastrea favulus

Conservation status
- Least Concern (IUCN 3.1)

Scientific classification
- Kingdom: Animalia
- Phylum: Cnidaria
- Subphylum: Anthozoa
- Class: Hexacorallia
- Order: Scleractinia
- Family: Merulinidae
- Genus: Goniastrea
- Species: G. favulus

Binomial name
- Goniastrea favulus (Dana, 1846)

Synonyms
- Astraea favulus Dana, 1846

= Goniastrea favulus =

Species of coral

Goniastrea favulus, also known as the lesser star coral, is a species of stony coral in the family Merulinidae. It occurs in shallow water in the Indo-Pacific region. This is an uncommon species of coral and the International Union for Conservation of Nature has rated its conservation status as being "near threatened".

== Description ==
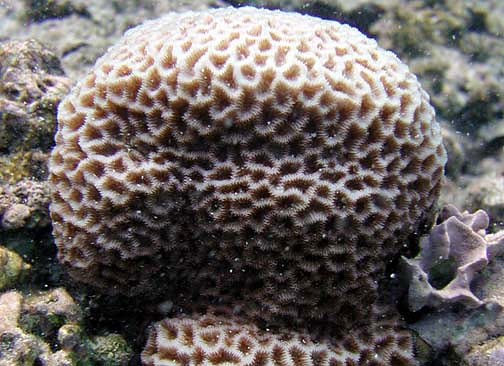
Goniastrea favulus

Colonies of Goniastrea favulus usually form greenish or brownish massive boulder-like structures. The polyps are either arranged in groups within a common corallite wall, or are in meandroid valleys. The walls of the corallites are thin, the septa bear large paliform lobes and there is a small central collumella.

== Distribution and habitat ==
Goniastrea favulus is native to the Indo-Pacific region. Its range extends from northern Madagascar and the eastern coast of Africa to the Maldive Islands, southeastern Asia, Japan, Australia and island groups in the Pacific Ocean. It is found in the intertidal and subtidal zones on fore and hind reef slopes, and in lagoons. It is generally uncommon and is seldom found deeper than 15 metres (50 ft).

== Ecology ==
Goniastrea favulus is a zooxanthellate species of coral, containing in its tissues many microscopic symbiotic dinoflagellates which during the day provide the coral with the products of photosynthesis. During the night, the polyps expand and extend their tentacles to catch zooplankton.

Colonies of Goniastrea favulus are simultaneous hermaphrodites and spawn once a year. Spawning is a synchronised event with all the colonies in a locality releasing their gametes into the sea at much the same time. The sperm is released in a jet while the eggs are negatively buoyant and surrounded by mucus and adhere to the colony. Although a majority of the eggs are cross-fertilised, a large number are self-fertilised. This contrasts with the closely related Goniastrea aspera and most other broadcast spawners, which release both eggs and sperm in discrete, buoyant egg-sperm bundles that float to the surface where fertilization occurs.
