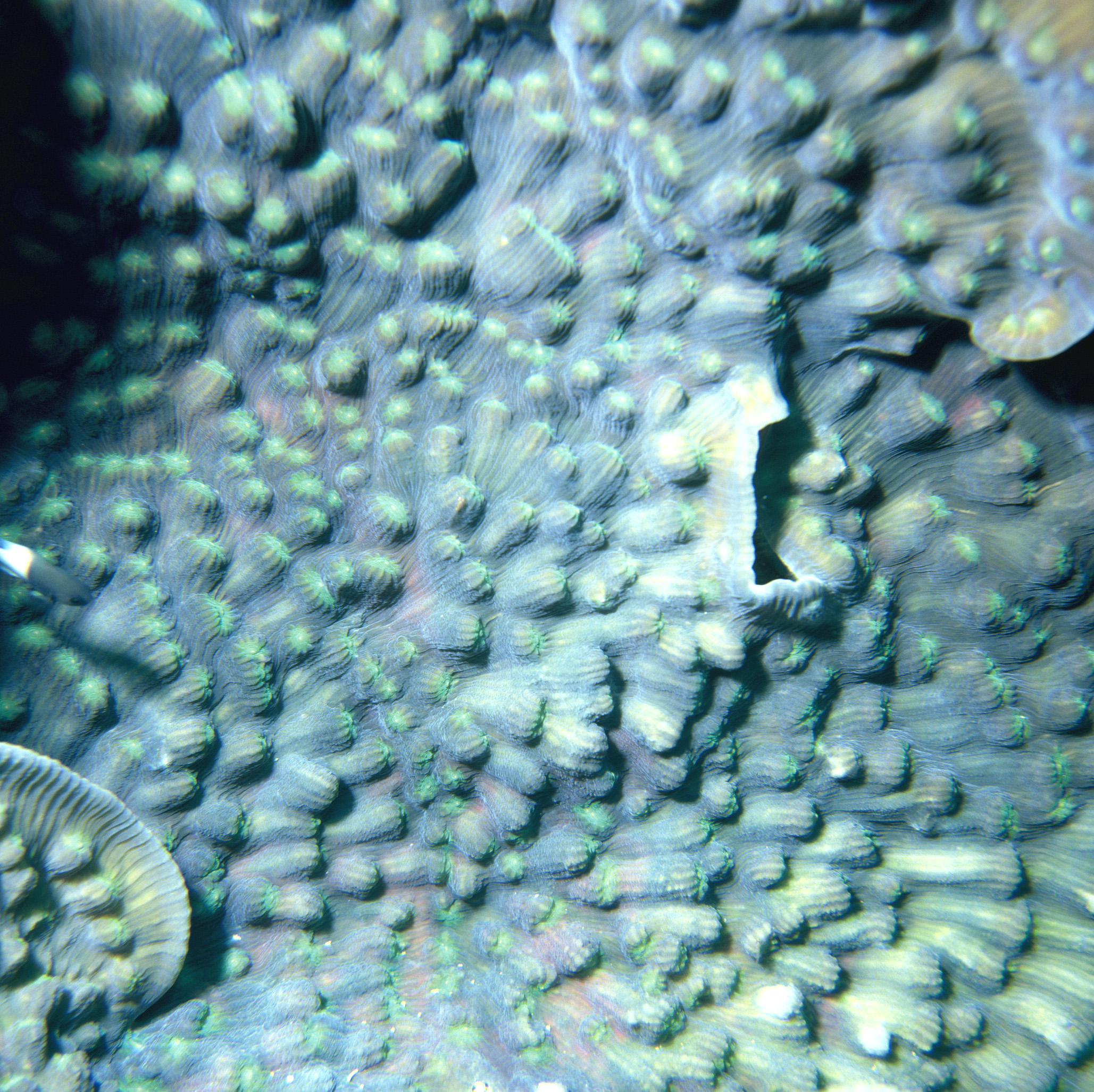
- Echinophyllia spp.

Scientific classification
- Kingdom: Animalia
- Phylum: Cnidaria
- Subphylum: Anthozoa
- Class: Hexacorallia
- Order: Scleractinia
- Family: Pectiniidae

Genera
- See text

= Pectiniidae =

Extinct family of corals

Pectiniidae was a family of stony corals, commonly known as chalice corals, but the name is no longer considered valid.

== Taxonomy ==
The "robust" stony coral families of Faviidae, Merulinidae, Mussidae and Pectiniidae, have traditionally been recognised on morphological grounds but recent molecular analysis has shown that these families are polyphyletic, the similarities between the species having occurred through convergent evolution. A revised classification, proposed in 2012, places the Pacific species of Mussidae in a new family, Lobophylliidae and retains the taxon Mussidae for the Atlantic species. In the revision, the genera Echinomorpha, Echinophyllia and Oxypora were transferred from Pectiniidae to Lobophylliidae, and the genera Mycedium, Pectinia and Physophyllia were transferred to Merulinidae. The family Pectiniidae was abolished.

== Genera ==
The World Register of Marine Species used to include the following genera in the family:

- Echinomorpha - Transferred to Lobophylliidae
- Echinophyllia - Transferred to Lobophylliidae
- Mycedium - Transferred to Merulinidae
- Oxypora - Transferred to Lobophylliidae
- Pectinia - Transferred to Merulinidae
- Physophyllia - Transferred to Merulinidae
