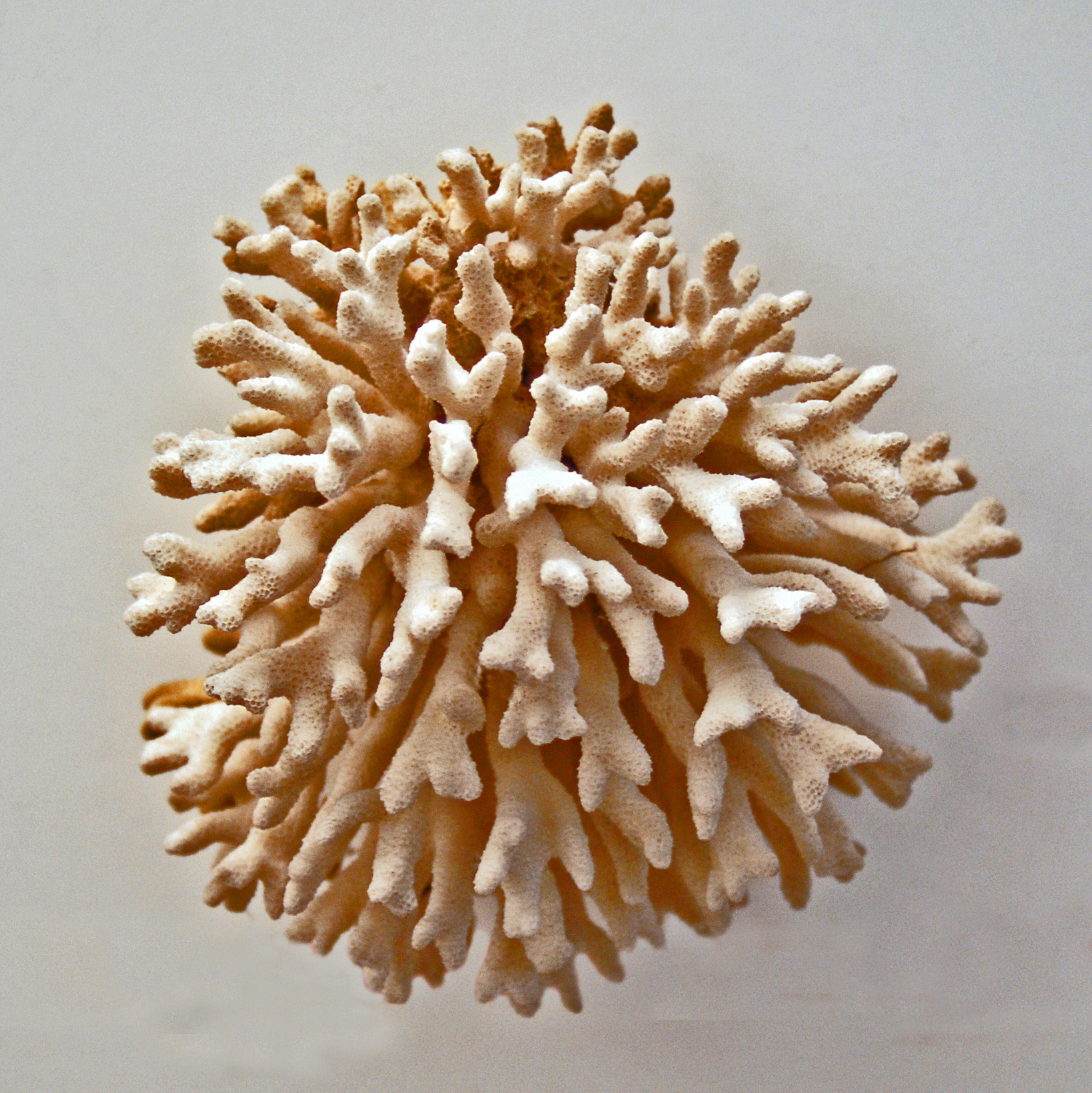

Conservation status
- Least Concern (IUCN 3.1)

Scientific classification
- Kingdom: Animalia
- Phylum: Cnidaria
- Subphylum: Anthozoa
- Class: Hexacorallia
- Order: Scleractinia
- Family: Merulinidae
- Genus: Echinopora
- Species: E. fruticulosa

Binomial name
- Echinopora fruticulosa Klunzinger, 1879

= Echinopora fruticulosa =

Species of coral

Echinopora fruticulosa is a species of stony coral in the family Merulinidae.

== Description ==
Colonies of Echinopora fruticulosa form dome-shaped clumps reaching a maximum diameter of 2 metres (6 ft 7 in) and height of 1.5 metres (4 ft 11 in). It is an entirely ramose species, with single tubular corallites of about 5–8 millimetres (0.20–0.31 in) in diameter, developed all around the branches. The basic color of these corals is pinkish-brown with pale corallites.

== Distribution and habitat ==
These widespread but not very common corals can be found in the Red Sea, the southwestern Indian Ocean, Madagascar and Comoros, usually in reefs close to sandy patches, at a depth of 4–20 metres (13–66 ft).
