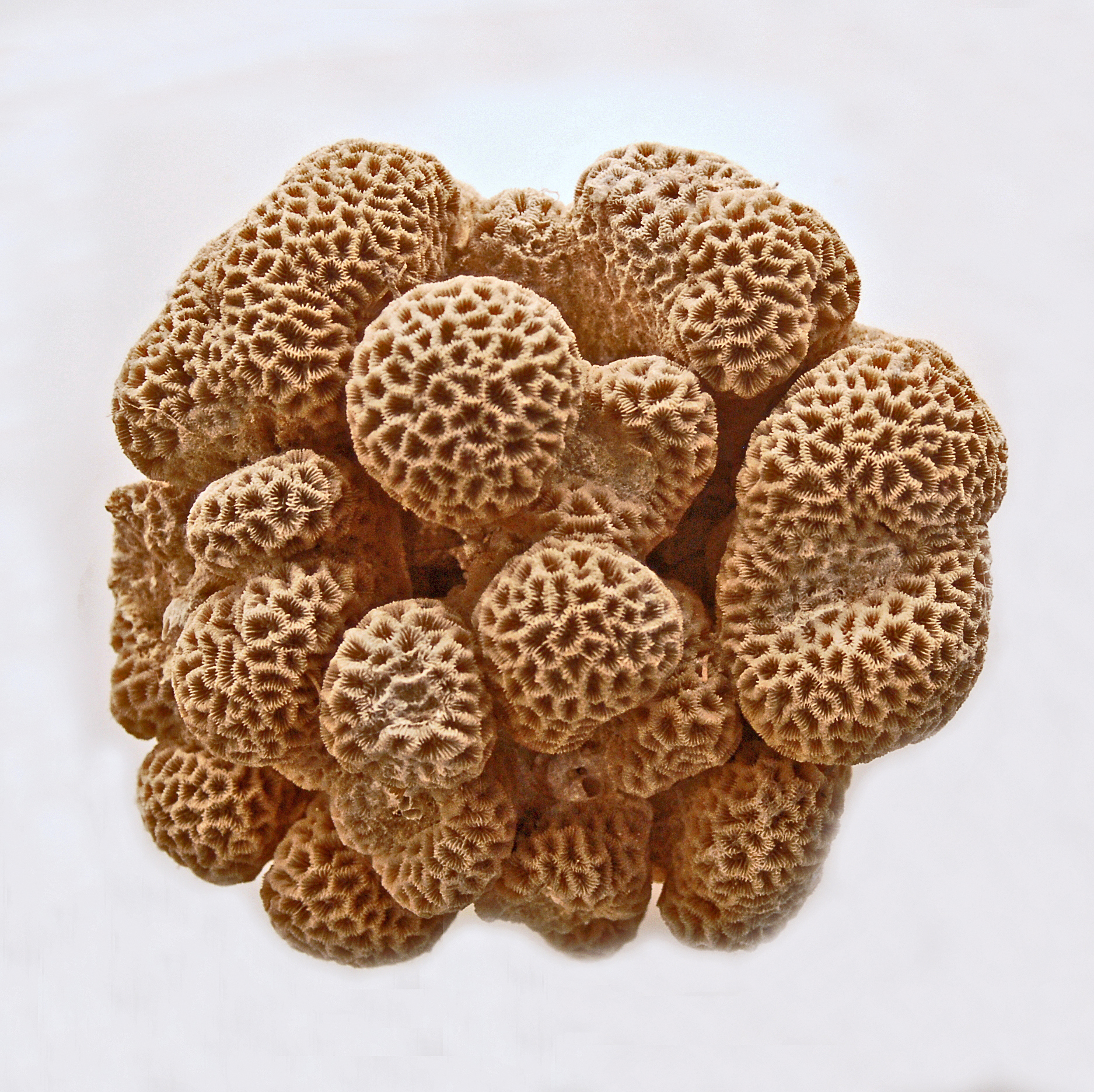
- Goniastrea retiformis

Conservation status
- Least Concern (IUCN 3.1)

Scientific classification
- Kingdom: Animalia
- Phylum: Cnidaria
- Subphylum: Anthozoa
- Class: Hexacorallia
- Order: Scleractinia
- Family: Merulinidae
- Genus: Goniastrea
- Species: G. retiformis

Binomial name
- Goniastrea retiformis (Lamarck, 1816)

Synonyms
- List: Astraea eximia Dana, 1846; Astraea retiformis Lamarck, 1816; Astraea spongia Ehrenberg, 1834; Astrea retiformis Lamarck, 1816; Goniastrea bournoni Milne Edwards & Haime, 1849; Goniastrea eximia (Dana, 1846)

= Goniastrea retiformis =

Species of coral

Goniastrea retiformis is a species of stony corals in the family Merulinidae. It is native to shallow water in the Indo-Pacific region.

== Description ==
This species forms massive colonies, domed, flat or columnar, reaching a maximum diameter of 50 centimetres (20 in) and a height of 1 metre (3 ft 3 in). It has small deep calices, usually with a diameter of 3–4 millimetres (0.12–0.16 in). Corallites are recessed, four to six sided. The basic color of these corals is cream or pale brown, but it may also be brown, pink or green.

== Distribution and habitat ==
This quite common species can be found in the Indo-West Pacific, the Red Sea, the Indian Ocean and the Australian coast. It occurs on reef slopes, especially in shallow waters.

== Biology ==
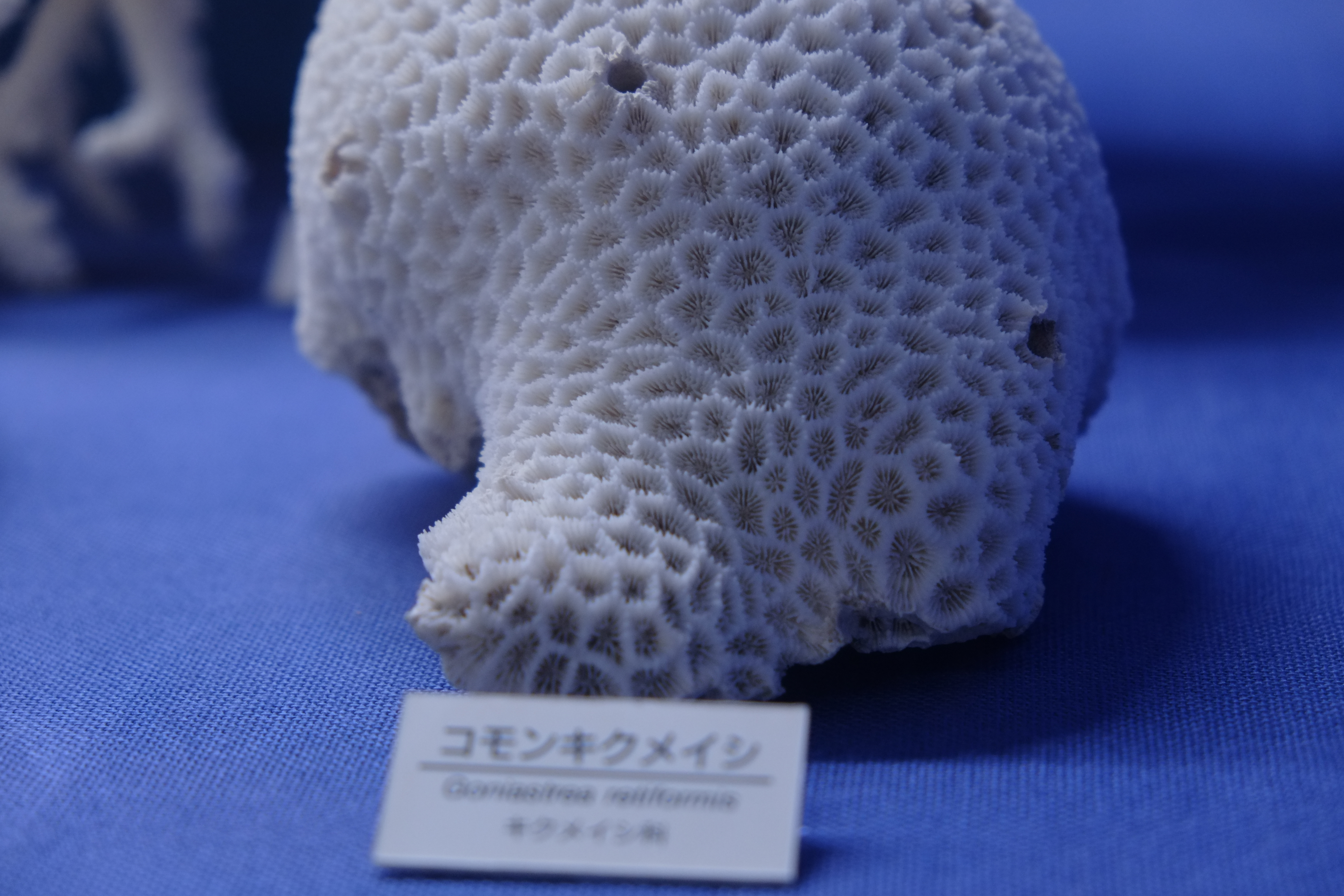
Close-up of Goniastrea Retiformis showing the recessed corallite.

Goniastrea retiformis is a zooxanthellate species of coral. It obtains most of its nutritional needs from the symbiotic dinoflagellates that live inside its soft tissues. These photosynthetic organisms provide the coral with organic carbon and nitrogen, sometimes providing up to 90% of their host's energy needs for metabolism and growth. Its remaining needs are met by the planktonic organisms caught by the tentacles of the polyps.

== Status ==
This coral is a common species with a wide range and large total population size which makes it more resilient than some coral species. The main threats faced by corals are related to the mechanical destruction of their coral reef habitats and climate change; these include increasing damage from extreme weather events, rising sea water temperatures and ocean acidification. The International Union for Conservation of Nature has assessed the conservation status of this species as being of "least concern". All corals receive protection by being listed on CITES Appendix II.
