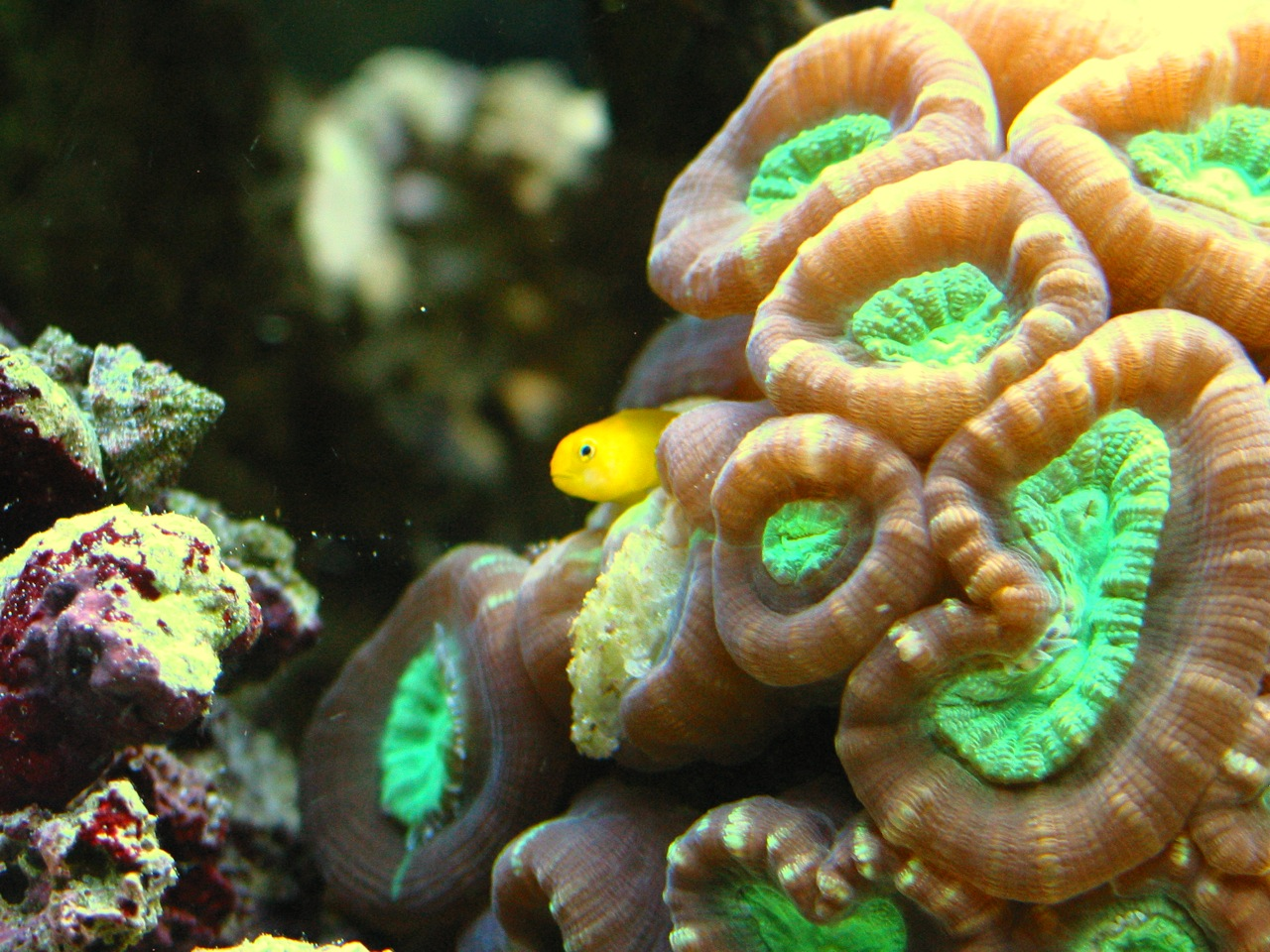

Conservation status
- Least Concern (IUCN 3.1)

Scientific classification
- Kingdom: Animalia
- Phylum: Cnidaria
- Subphylum: Anthozoa
- Class: Hexacorallia
- Order: Scleractinia
- Family: Merulinidae
- Genus: Caulastraea
- Species: C. furcata

Binomial name
- Caulastraea furcata (Dana, 1846)

Synonyms
- List: Caulastraea distorta Dana, 1846; Caulastrea distorta Dana, 1846 [lapsus]; Caulastrea furcata Dana, 1846

= Caulastraea furcata =

Species of coral

Caulastraea furcata, also known as the candy cane, trumpet, or bullseye coral, is a species of large stony coral in the family Merulinidae.

== Description ==
Caulastraea furcata skeletal structure consist of tubular stalks with stars on each tip. As in other colony-forming corals, colonies of C. furcata are made up of several large polyps. Each polyp bears relatively short tentacles that direct food into its central mouth. The food is then digested in a sac-like body cavity. This species is often green, yellow, or greenish brown.

== Distribution and habitat ==
Caulastraea furcata can be found in the Indo-Pacific from Fiji to Australia and possibly further west toward Thailand.

This species is usually found in protected reef slopes where the substrate is partly sandy, where it will form extensive single species stands, sometimes over five metres across. It has been recorded to depths of at least 30 metres, and may also be found in lagoons.

== Ecology ==
Caulastraea furcata usually obtains most of its nutrient requirements from the photosynthesis of the single-celled algae called zooxanthellae living in its tissue. However, this coral will also feed on zooplankton.
