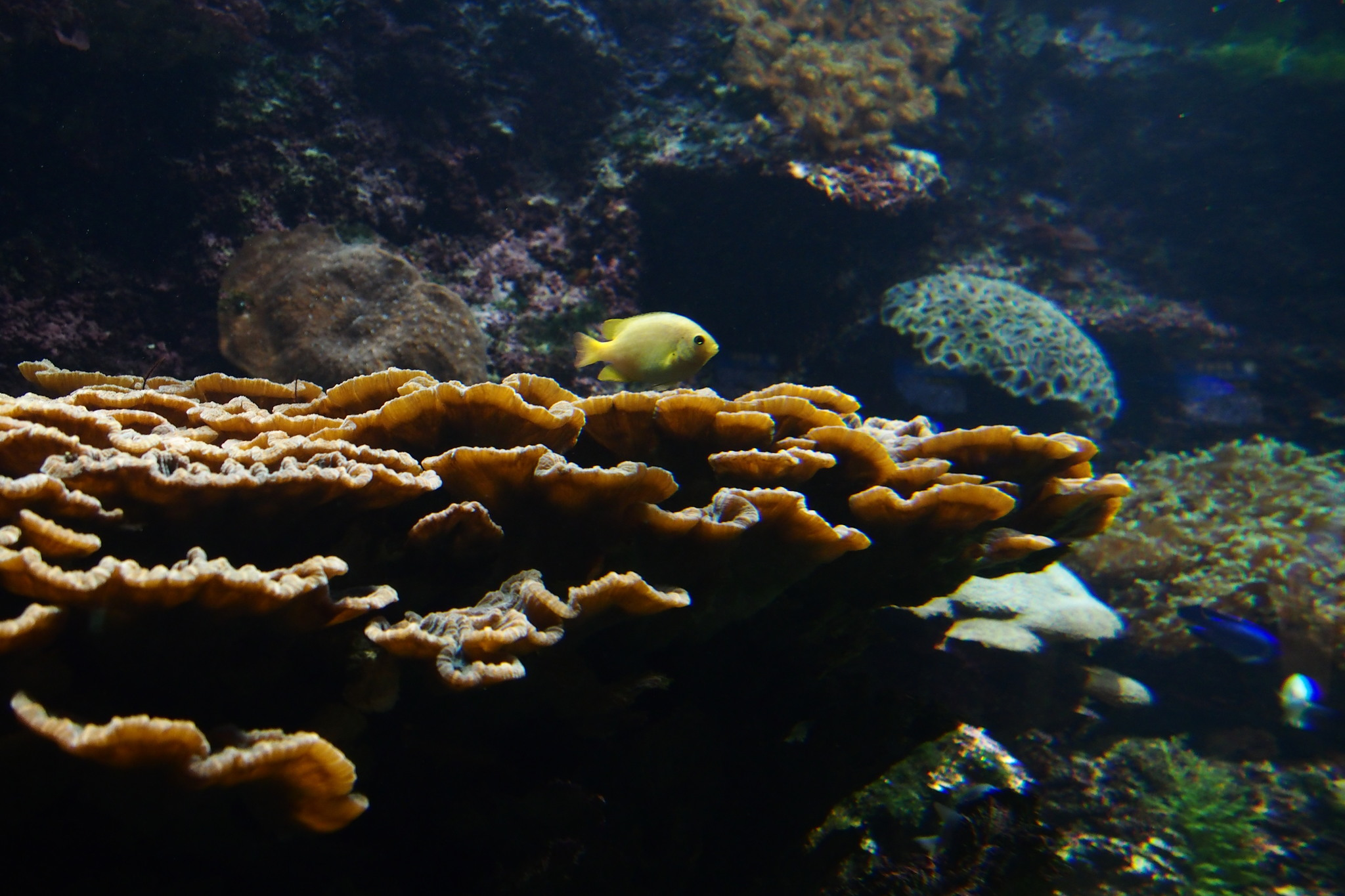

Conservation status
- Data Deficient (IUCN 3.1)

Scientific classification
- Kingdom: Animalia
- Phylum: Cnidaria
- Subphylum: Anthozoa
- Class: Hexacorallia
- Order: Scleractinia
- Family: Merulinidae
- Genus: Physophyllia
- Species: P. ayleni

Binomial name
- Physophyllia ayleni (Wells, 1935)

Synonyms
- Pectinia ayleni Wells, 1935; Physophyllia wellsi Nemenzo, 1971

= Physophyllia =

Monotypic genus of coral

Physophyllia is a monotypic genus of coral in the family Merulinidae. Its sole assigned species is Physophyllia ayleni. The species was first described by John W. Wells in 1935. It is a hermatypic coral that constructs reefs in the temperate and tropical waters of the Indo-Pacific.

== Morphology ==
P. ayleni forms colonies with encrusting or stratified plates. The plates have vertical walls of irregular height, radiating toward the plate margins. These walls separate individual corallites or small groups of corallites, which are consequently widely spaced. Its color ranges from dark grey to dark brownish-green. Some specimens reach 1 m (3.3 ft) in diameter, but colonies of 20–30 cm (8–12 in) are more common.

== Taxonomy ==
P. ayleni was thought to be in the Pectiniidae family, but it was reclassified in 2014 to the family Merulinidae. However, as of 2026, the Integrated Taxonomic Information System still includes P. ayleni in Pectiniidae.

== Habitat and distribution ==
It lives in coral reefs located in tropical waters near the coast. It is found in most reef habitats, except in areas with strong currents. It typically occurs at depths between 2 and 25 m (6.6 and 82.0 ft). The species is found in the Indo-Pacific and is native to Australia, Cambodia, the Philippines, Indonesia, Japan, Malaysia, Papua New Guinea, Sinapore, the Solomon Islands, Taiwan, Thailand and Vietnam.

== Food ==
It contains mutualistic symbiotic algae (both organisms benefit from the relationship) called zooxanthellae. The algae perform photosynthesis, producing oxygen and sugars, which are used by the polyps, and they feed on the coral's metabolic waste products (especially phosphorus and nitrogen).
