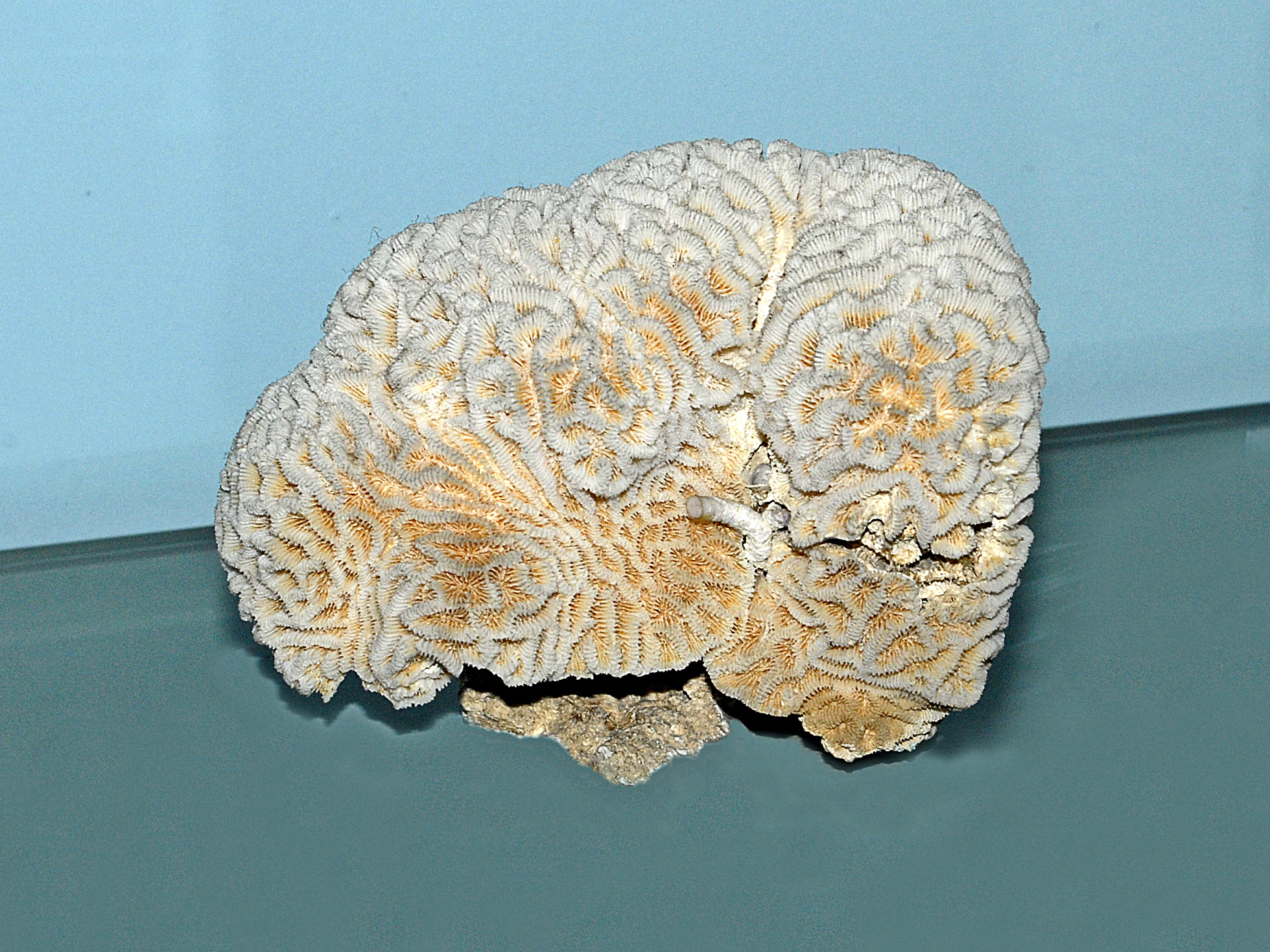
- From the Eritrean coast of the Red Sea

Conservation status
- Least Concern (IUCN 3.1)

Scientific classification
- Kingdom: Animalia
- Phylum: Cnidaria
- Subphylum: Anthozoa
- Class: Hexacorallia
- Order: Scleractinia
- Family: Merulinidae
- Genus: Paragoniastrea
- Species: P. australensis

Binomial name
- Paragoniastrea australensis (Milne-Edwards & Haime, 1857)

Synonyms
- List: Coeloria australensis Milne Edwards, 1857; Goniastrea australensis (Milne Edwards, 1857); Goniastrea benhami Vaughan, 1917; Prionastraea australensis Milne Edwards, 1857

= Paragoniastrea australensis =

Species of coral

Paragoniastrea australensis, also known as the Lesser star coral, is a species of stony corals in the family Merulinidae. It occurs in shallow water in the Indo-Pacific region.

== Description ==
Colonies of Paragoniastrea australensis can be massive, submassive or encrusting. The corallites are arranged in deep valleys with steep walls. The valleys are meandroid and may be short or long, depending on the habitat in which the coral grows. The septa are even and regularly spaced and extend over the valley walls into the next valley. They are finely toothed and have paliform lobes, and the columella are large. This coral is quite variable in colour, most often being some shade of green or brown, with the valley floor often contrasting with the rest of the surface.

== Distribution and habitat ==
This widespread and common species can be found in shallow or clear waters in the Indo-West Pacific (Red Sea, Gulf of Aden, Indian Ocean, Australia, Southeast Asia, Japan and China Sea).

== Biology ==
Paragoniastrea australensis is a zooxanthellate species of coral. It obtains most of its nutritional needs from the symbiotic dinoflagellates that live within its soft tissues, supplementing this with the planktonic organisms caught by the polyps.

== Status ==
This coral is a common species with a wide range and large total population size which makes it more resilient than some other species of coral. The main threats faced by corals are related to the mechanical destruction of their coral reef habitats and climate change; these include increasing damage from extreme weather events, rising sea water temperatures and ocean acidification. The International Union for Conservation of Nature has assessed the conservation status of this species as being of "least concern". All corals receive protection by being listed on CITES Appendix II.
