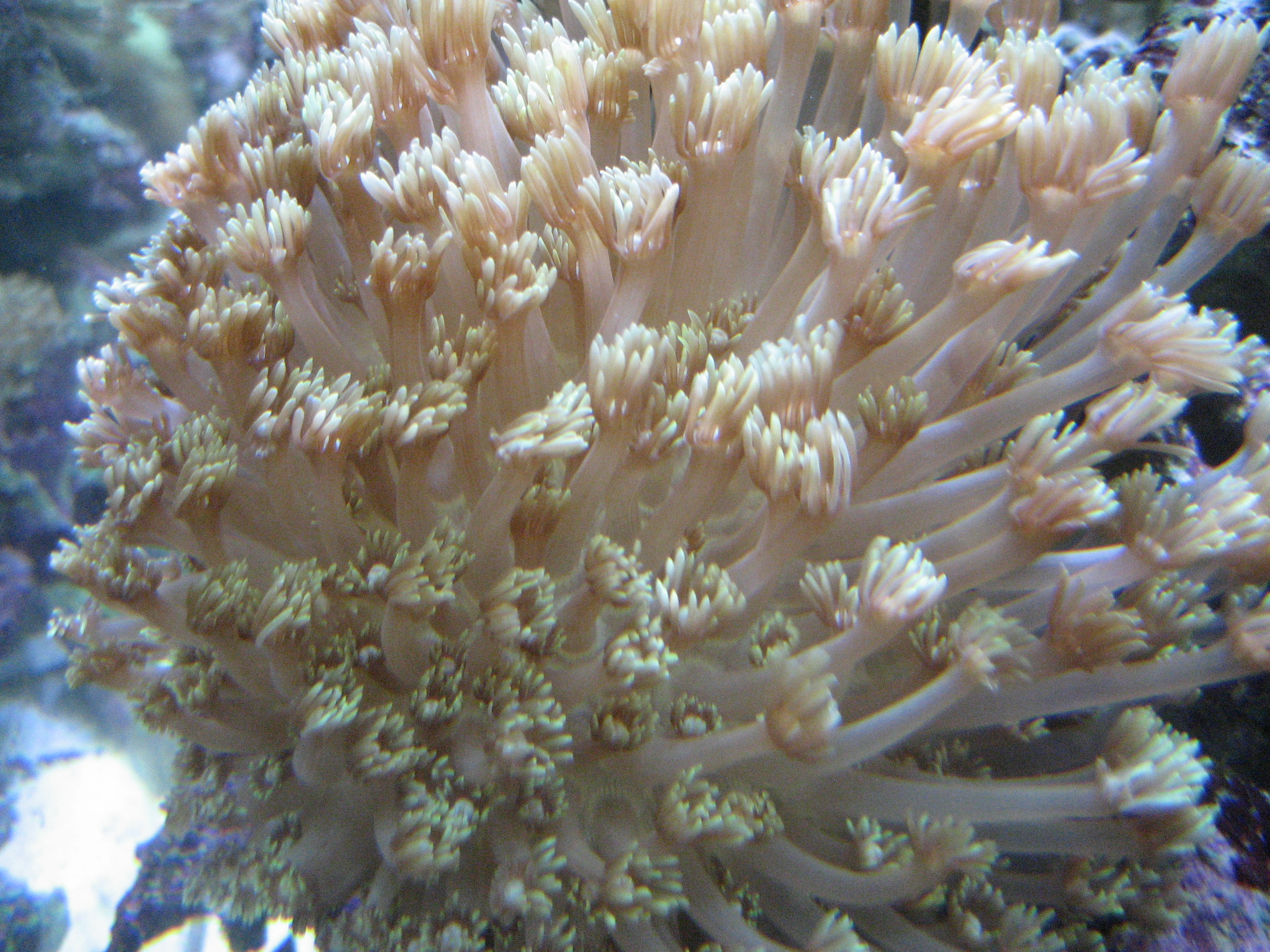
- Merulina ampliata

Scientific classification
- Kingdom: Animalia
- Phylum: Cnidaria
- Subphylum: Anthozoa
- Class: Hexacorallia
- Order: Scleractinia
- Family: Merulinidae
- Genus: Merulina; Ehrenberg, 1834

Species
- See text

Synonyms
- Clavarina Verrill, 1864; Paraclavarina Veron, 1985

= Merulina =

Genus of corals

Merulina is a genus of stony corals in the family Merulinidae. Members of this genus are native to the Indo-Pacific region and their ranges extend from the Red Sea through the Indian Ocean as far as Japan and the southern central Pacific Ocean. Merulina ampliata is the type species.

== Characteristics ==
Colonies can be laminar, foliose, columnar or arborescent, and can adopt all of these forms in a single colony. On laminar plates, valleys radiate from the centre, becoming contorted on branching structures.

== Species ==
The following species are currently recognized by the World Register of Marine Species :

- Merulina ampliata (Ellis & Solander, 1786)
- †Merulina isseli (Prever, 1922)
- Merulina rotunda Nemenzo, 1959
- Merulina scabricula Dana, 1846
- Merulina scheeri Head, 1983
- Merulina triangularis (Veron & Pichon, 1980)
