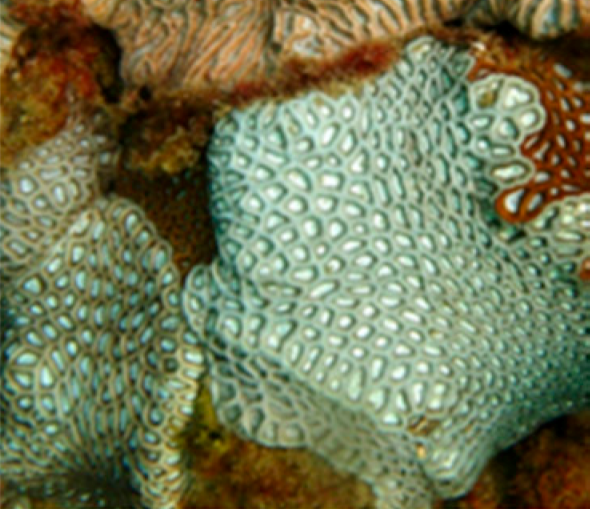
- Coelastrea aspera on Minden Reef, Australia

Scientific classification
- Kingdom: Animalia
- Phylum: Cnidaria
- Subphylum: Anthozoa
- Class: Hexacorallia
- Order: Scleractinia
- Family: Merulinidae
- Genus: Coelastrea; Verrill, 1866

Species
- See text

= Coelastrea =

Genus of stony corals

Coelastrea is a genus of stony corals in the family Merulinidae. Members of this genus are native to the Indo-Pacific region and their ranges extend from the Red Sea and the east coast of Africa through the Indian Ocean and Western Pacific Ocean as far as Australia, Japan and the East China Sea.

== Species ==
The following species are currently recognized by the World Register of Marine Species:

- Coelastrea aspera (Verrill, 1866)
- Coelastrea palauensis (Yabe & Sugiyama, 1936)
- Coelastrea tenuis Verrill, 1866
