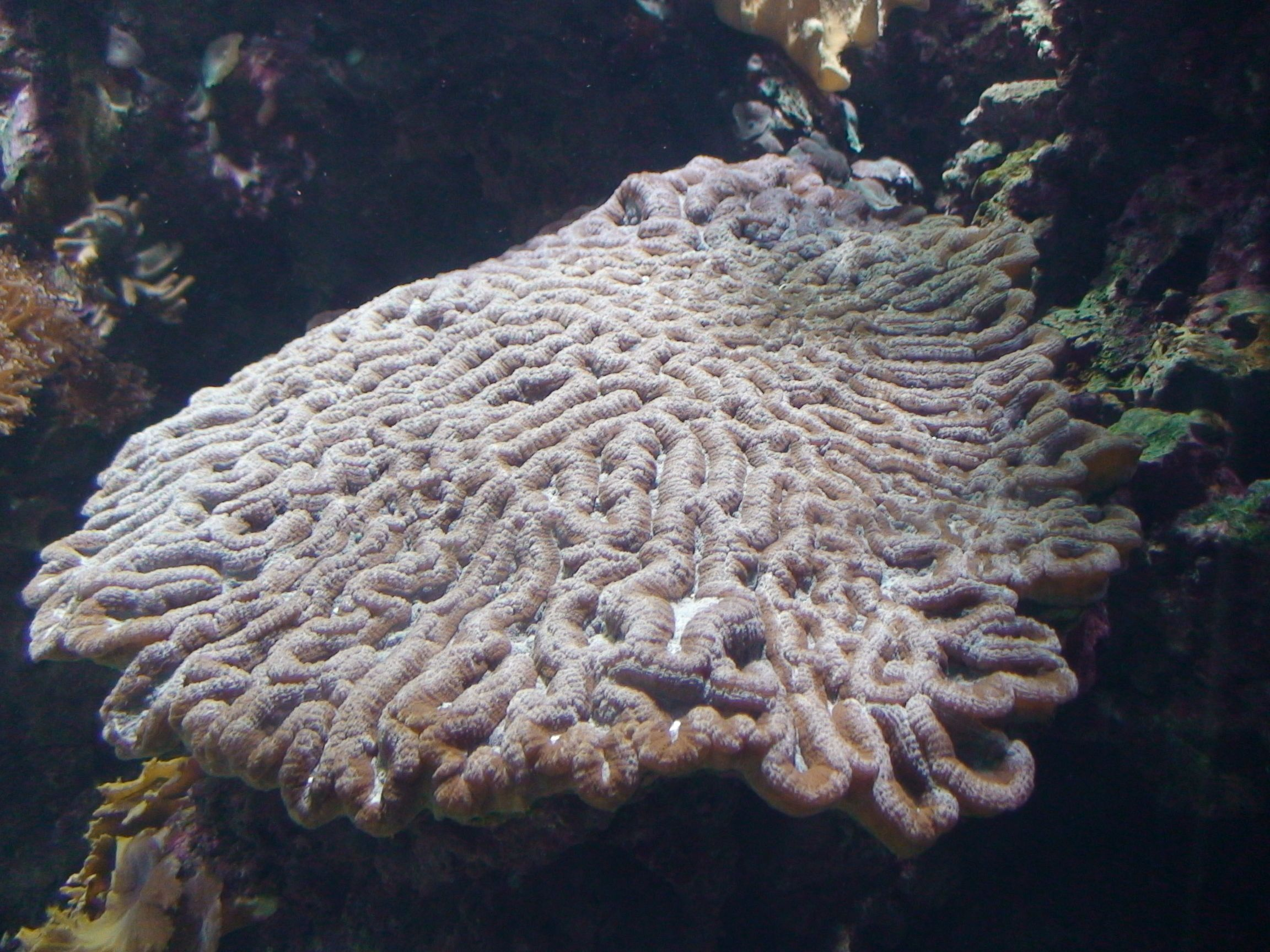
- Oulophyllia crispa

Scientific classification
- Kingdom: Animalia
- Phylum: Cnidaria
- Subphylum: Anthozoa
- Class: Hexacorallia
- Order: Scleractinia
- Family: Merulinidae
- Genus: Oulophyllia; Milne Edwards & Haime, 1848

Species
- See text

Synonyms
- Coelogyra Nemenzo, 1959; Ulophyllia Milne Edwards, 1857

= Oulophyllia =

Genus of stony corals

Oulophyllia is a genus of stony corals in the family Merulinidae. Members of this genus are native to the tropical western and central Indo-Pacific region.

== Characteristics ==
The colonies of these corals are massive and form dome-shaped mounds, similar to Favites, but the corallites are arranged in valleys with broad ridges between them.

== Species ==
The following species are currently recognized by the World Register of Marine Species :

- Oulophyllia bennettae (Veron, Pichon & Best, 1977)
- Oulophyllia crispa (Lamarck, 1816)
- Oulophyllia levis (Nemenzo, 1959)
