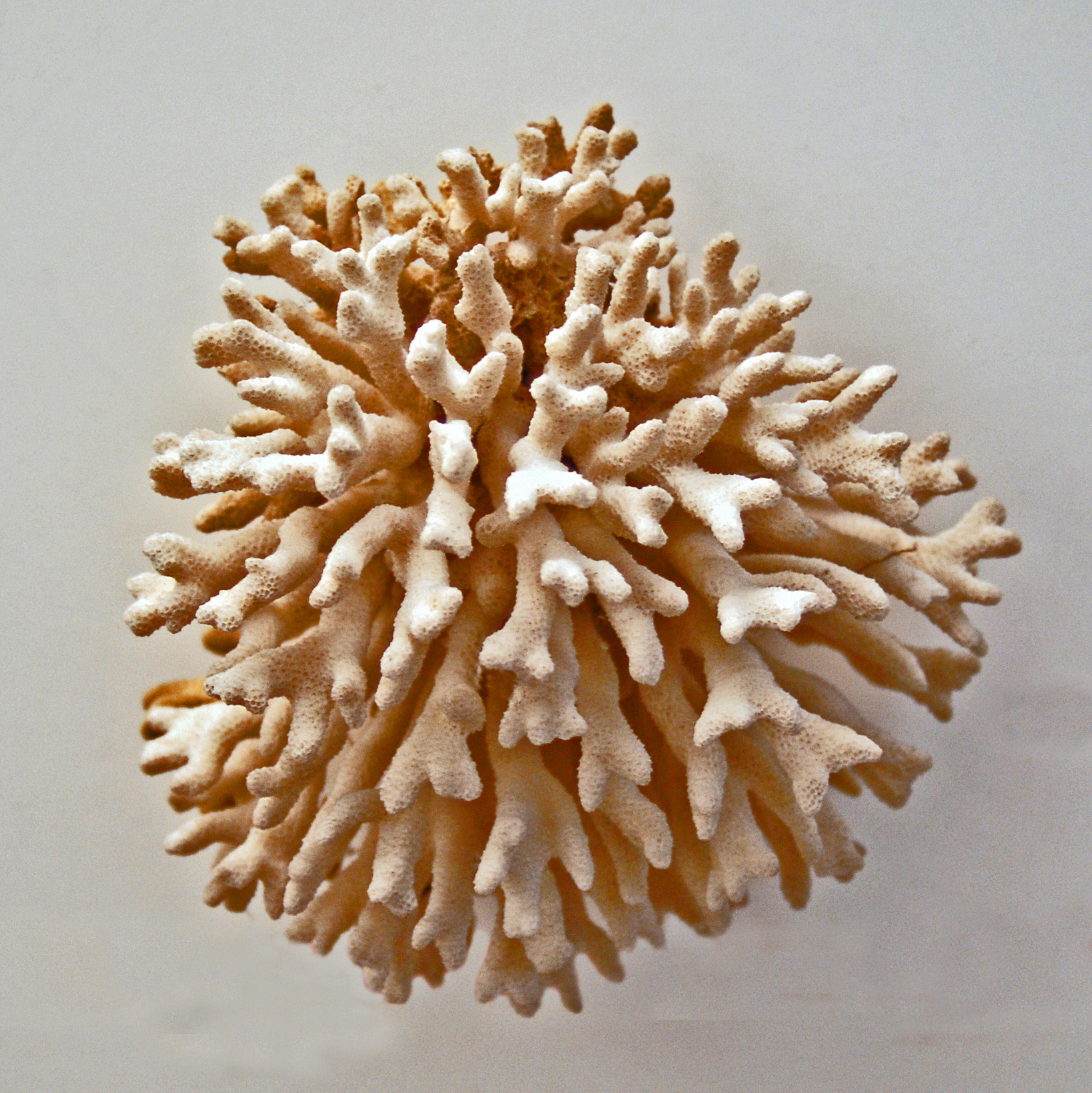
- Echinopora fruticulosa

Scientific classification
- Kingdom: Animalia
- Phylum: Cnidaria
- Subphylum: Anthozoa
- Class: Hexacorallia
- Order: Scleractinia
- Family: Merulinidae
- Genus: Echinopora; Lamarck, 1816

Synonyms
- List: Acanthelia Wells, 1937; Acanthopora Verrill, 1864; Echinastrea De Blainville, 1830; Stephanocora Ehrenberg, 1834

= Echinopora =

Genus of corals

Echinopora is a genus of stony corals in the family Merulinidae.

== Species ==
The following species are currently recognized:

- Echinopora ashmorensis Veron, 1990
- Echinopora forskaliana (Milne Edwards & Haime, 1849)
- Echinopora fruticulosa Klunzinger, 1879
- Echinopora gemmacea (Lamarck, 1816)
- Echinopora hirsutissima Milne Edwards & Haime, 1849
- Echinopora horrida Dana, 1846
- Echinopora irregularis Veron, Turak & DeVantier, 2000
- Echinopora lamellosa (Esper, 1795)
- Echinopora mammiformis (Nemenzo, 1959)
- Echinopora pacificus Veron, 1990
- Echinopora robusta Veron, 2000
- Echinopora spinulosa Brüggemann
- Echinopora tiranensis Veron, Turak & DeVantier, 2000
