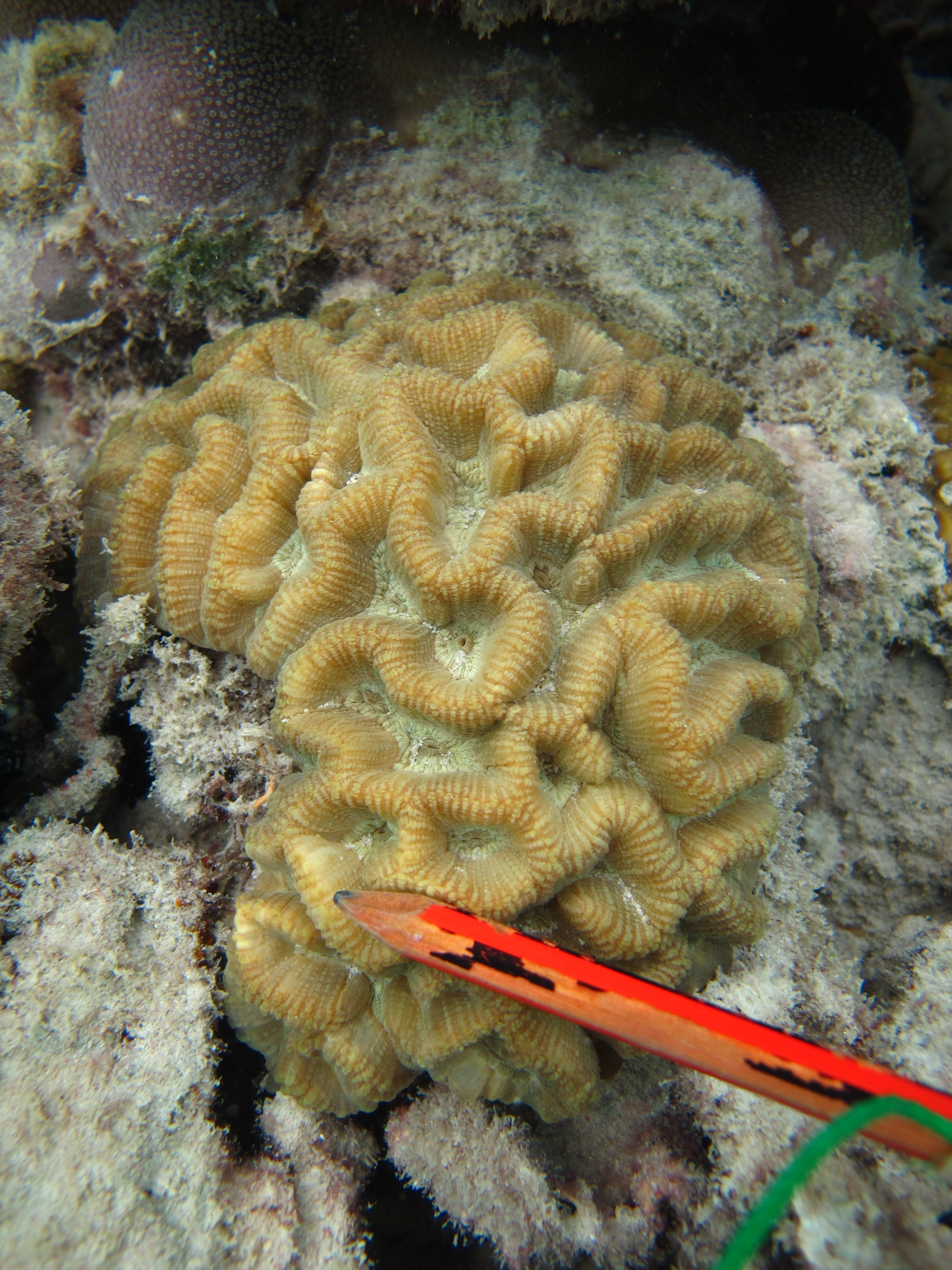
- Paragoniastrea

Scientific classification
- Kingdom: Animalia
- Phylum: Cnidaria
- Subphylum: Anthozoa
- Class: Hexacorallia
- Order: Scleractinia
- Family: Merulinidae
- Genus: Paragoniastrea; Huang, Benzoni & Budd, 2014

Species
- See text

= Paragoniastrea =

Genus of corals

Paragoniastrea is a genus of stony corals in the family Merulinidae.

== Species ==
The following species are currently recognized by the World Register of Marine Species:

- Paragoniastrea australensis (Milne Edwards, 1857)
- Paragoniastrea deformis (Veron, 1990)
- Paragoniastrea russelli (Wells, 1954)
