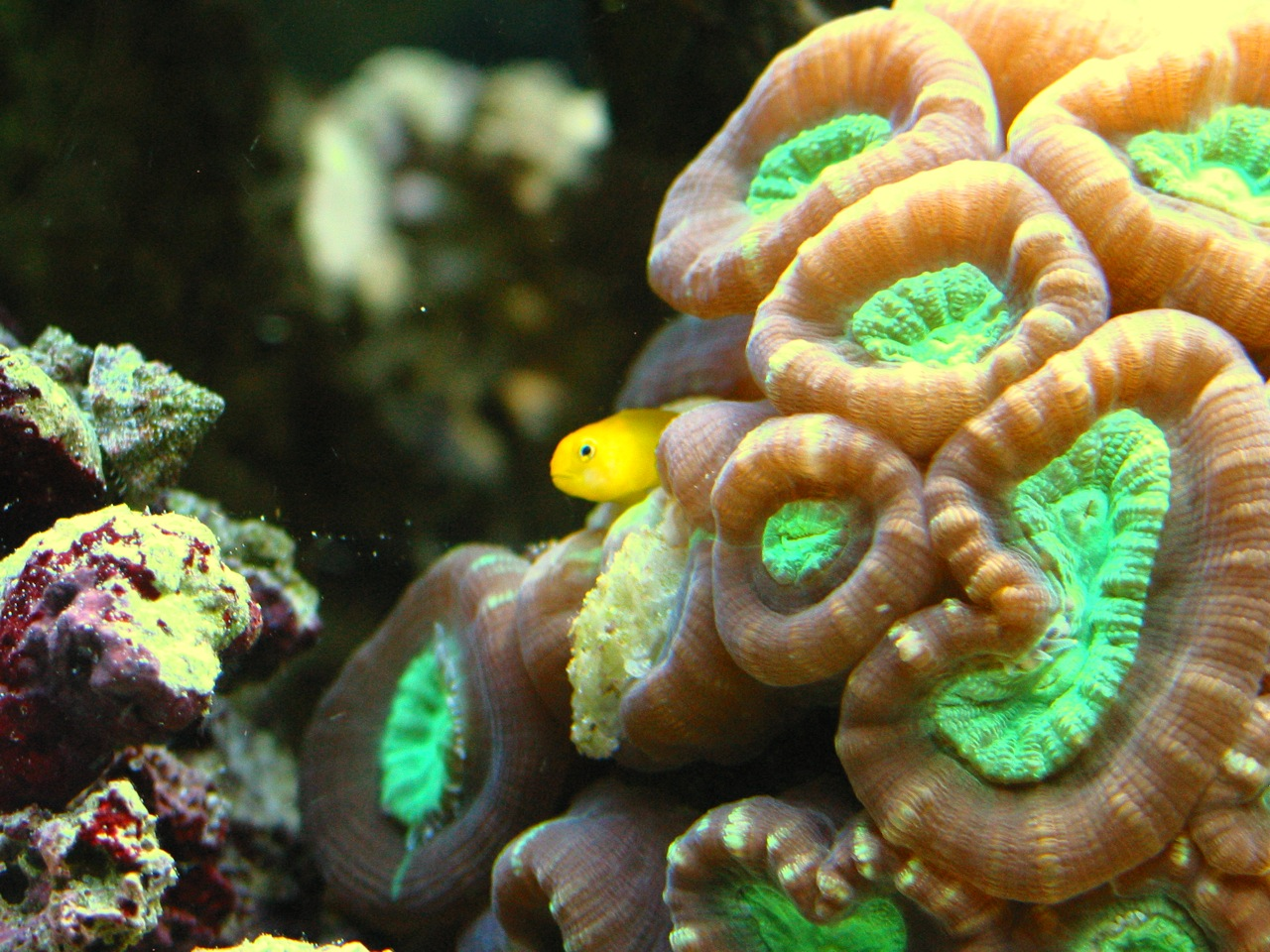
- Caulastraea furcata

Scientific classification
- Kingdom: Animalia
- Phylum: Cnidaria
- Subphylum: Anthozoa
- Class: Hexacorallia
- Order: Scleractinia
- Family: Merulinidae
- Genus: Caulastraea; Dana, 1846

Species
- See text

Synonyms
- List: Astraeosmilia Ortmann, 1892; Astreosmilia Ortmann, 1892 [lapsus]; Caulastrea Dana, 1846 [lapsus]; Dasyphyllia Milne Edwards & Haime, 1849

= Caulastraea =

Genus of corals

Caulastraea is a genus of stony corals in the family Merulinidae. Species of Caulastraea are commonly found in the aquarium trade under the names candy cane coral or trumpet coral.

== Species ==
The following species are currently recognized:

- Caulastraea connata (Ortmann, 1892)
- Caulastraea curvata Wijsman-Best, 1972
- Caulastraea echinulata (M. Edwards & Haime, 1849)
- Caulastraea furcata Dana, 1846
- Caulastraea tumida Matthai, 1928

== Gallery ==
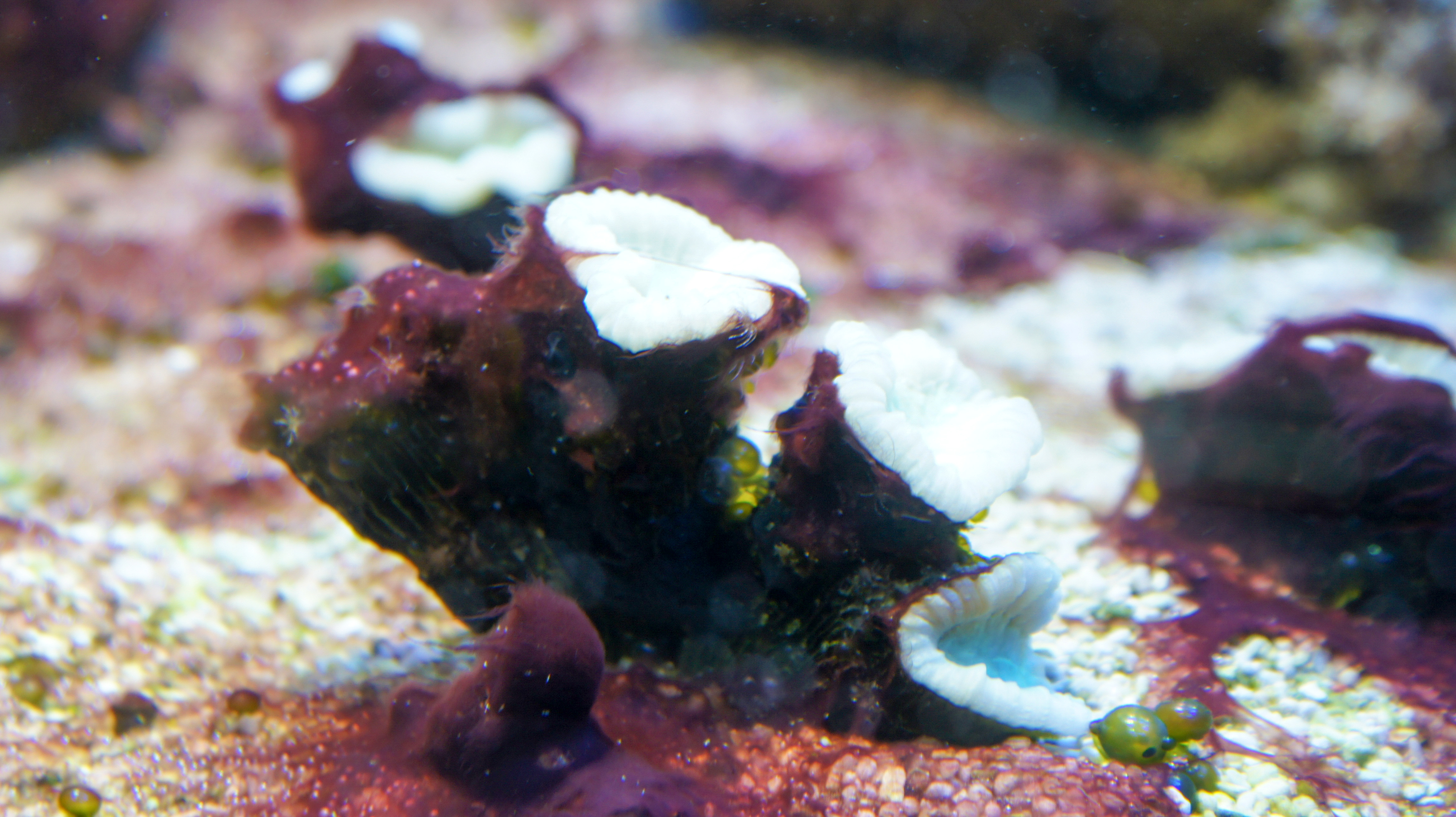
At Birdworld, England

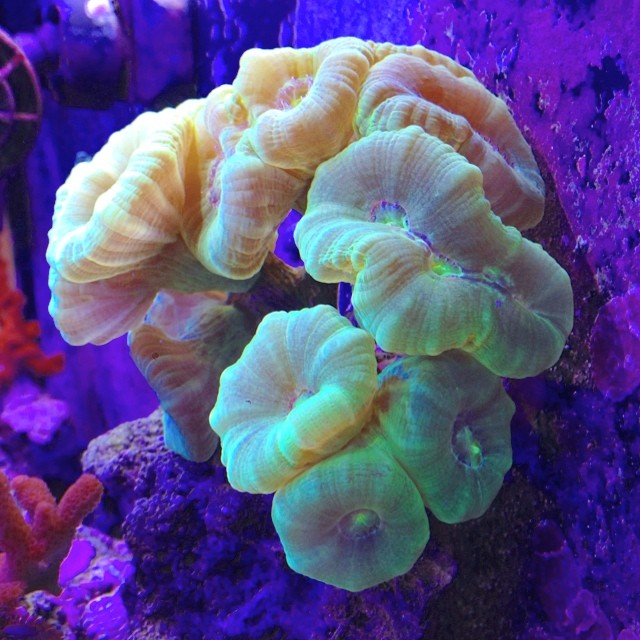
A colony in captivity

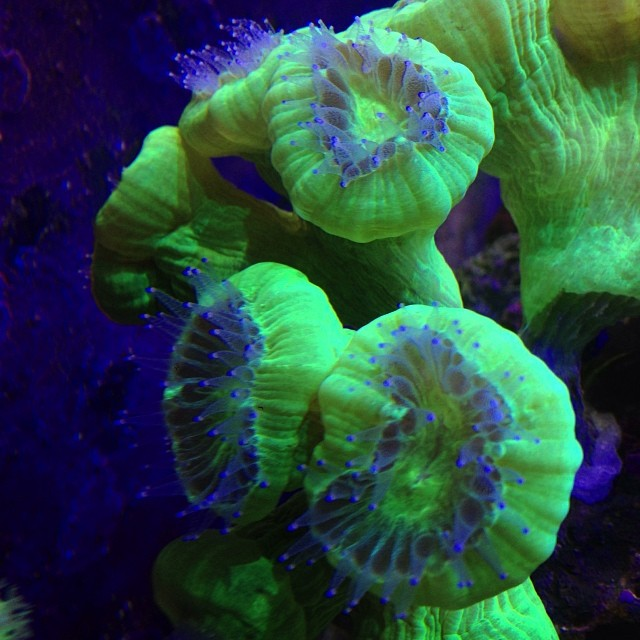
Feeder tentacles extended
