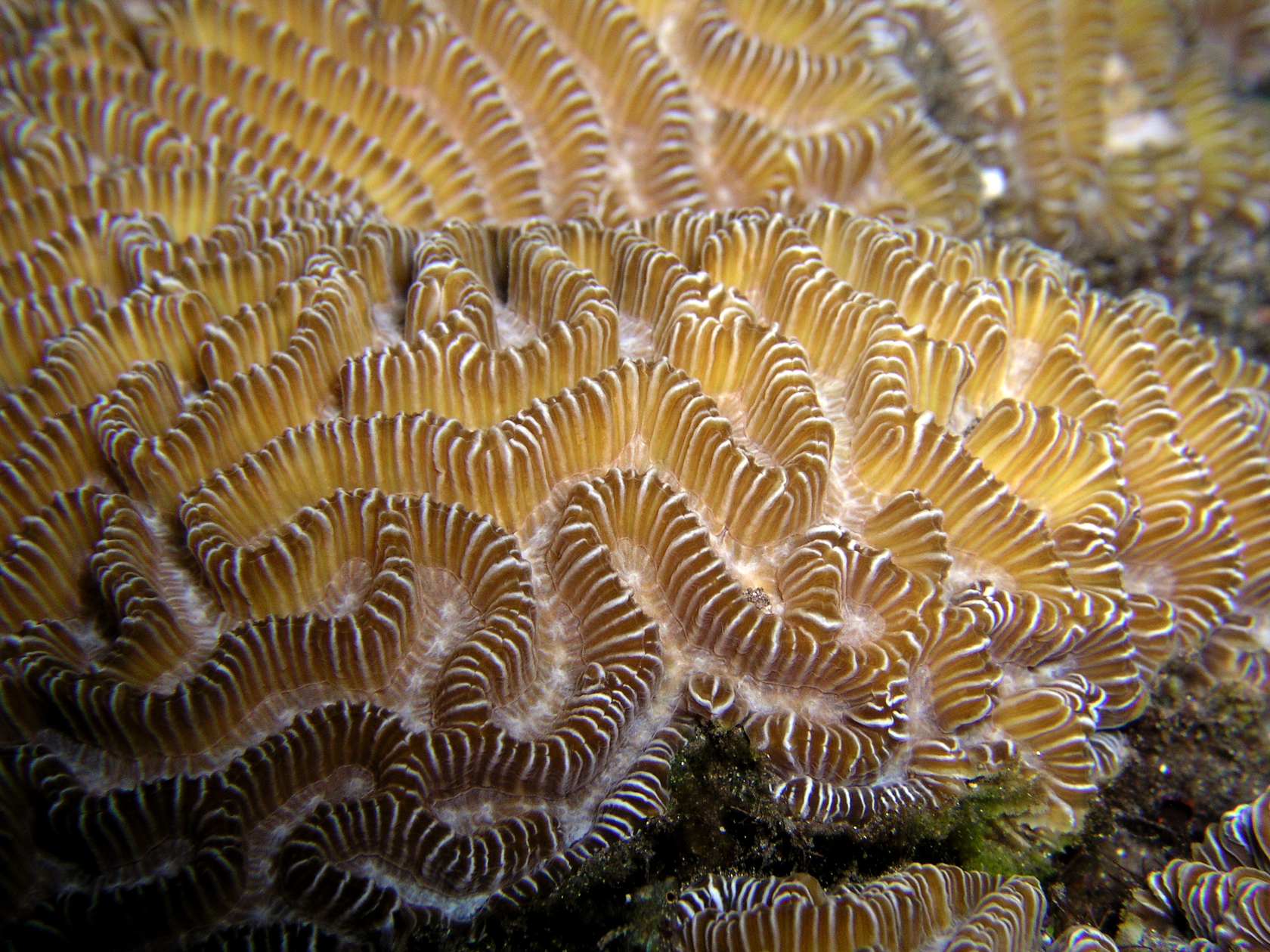
- Platygyra lamellina

Scientific classification
- Kingdom: Animalia
- Phylum: Cnidaria
- Subphylum: Anthozoa
- Class: Hexacorallia
- Order: Scleractinia
- Family: Merulinidae
- Genus: Platygyra; Ehrenberg, 1834

Species
- See text

Synonyms
- List: Astroria Milne Edwards & Haime, 1848; Caeloria Milne Edwards & Haime, 1848; Coeloria Milne Edwards & Haime, 1849

= Platygyra =

Genus of corals

Platygyra is a genus of stony corals in the family Merulinidae.

== Species ==
The following species are currently recognized:

- Platygyra acuta Veron, 2002
- Platygyra carnosus Veron, 2002
- Platygyra contorta Veron, 1990
- Platygyra crosslandi (Matthai, 1928)
- Platygyra daedalea (Ellis & Solander, 1786)
- Platygyra lamellina (Ehrenberg, 1834)
- Platygyra pini Chevalier, 1975
- Platygyra ryukyuensis Yabe & Sugiyama, 1935
- Platygyra sinensis (Milne Edwards & Haime, 1849)
- Platygyra verweyi Wijsman-Best, 1976
- Platygyra yaeyamaensis (Eguchi & Shirai, 1977)
