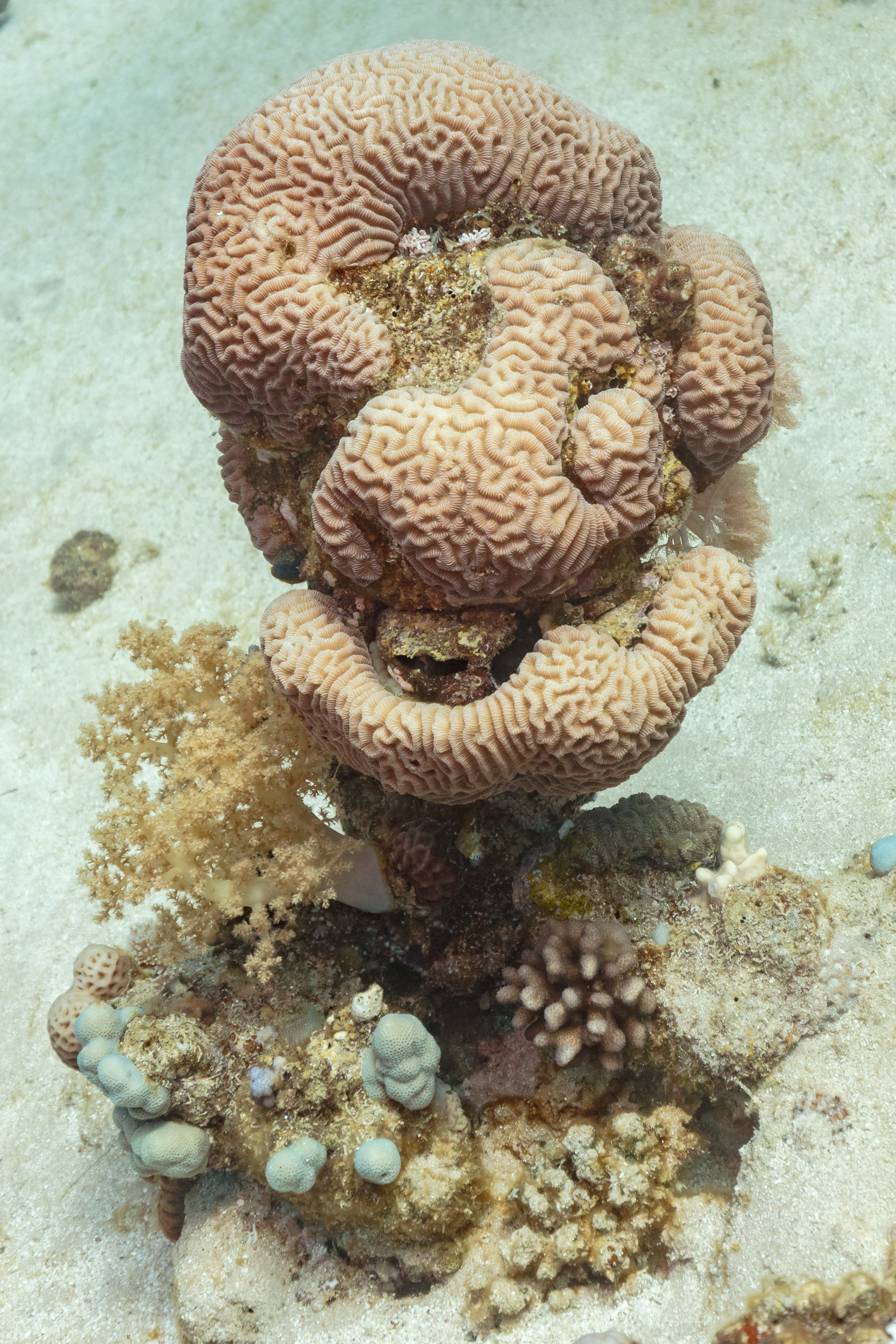
- P. daedalea from Ras Muhammad National Park, Egypt

Conservation status
- Least Concern (IUCN 3.1)

Scientific classification
- Kingdom: Animalia
- Phylum: Cnidaria
- Subphylum: Anthozoa
- Class: Hexacorallia
- Order: Scleractinia
- Family: Merulinidae
- Genus: Platygyra
- Species: P. daedalea

Binomial name
- Platygyra daedalea (Ellis & Solander, 1786)

Synonyms
- List: Astroria astraeiformis Milne Edwards & Haime, 1849; Astroria daedalea (Ellis & Solander, 1786); Astroria esperi Milne Edwards & Haime, 1849; Caeloria daedalea (Ellis & Scholander, 1786); Coeloria astraeiformis (Milne Edwards & Haime, 1849); Coeloria daedalea (Ellis & Solander, 1786); Coeloria esperi (Milne Edwards & Haime, 1849); Coeloria rustica (Dana, 1846); Madrepora daedalea Ellis & Solander, 1786; Maeandra astraeiformis (Milne Edwards & Haime, 1849); Maeandra daedalea (Ellis & Solander, 1786); Maeandrina daedalea (Milne Edwards & Haime, 1849); Maeandrina rustica Dana, 1846; Meandra daedalea (Ellis & Solander, 1786); Meandra esperi (Milne Edwards & Haime, 1849); Meandrina daedalea (Ellis & Solander, 1786); Platygyra astraeiformis (Milne Edwards & Haime, 1849); Platygyra esperi (Milne Edwards & Haime, 1849); Platygyra rustica (Dana, 1846)

= Platygyra daedalea =

Species of coral

Platygyra daedalea, sometimes known as the lesser valley coral, is a colonial species of stony coral in the family Merulinidae. It occurs on reefs in shallow water in the Indo-Pacific region. It is a common species and the International Union for Conservation of Nature has assessed its conservation status as being of "least concern".

== Description ==
Platygyra daedalea usually forms massive dome or boulder-shaped colonies which may be a metre (yard) or more in diameter; however, sometimes it forms flattened plates or it may be encrusting. The polyps are situated in meandering valleys with low walls between them which are often perforated. The septa are toothed and protuberant, usually with uneven or pointed tips. There is an obvious ridge, the columella, in the centre of the valley. The colour varies and there may be contrasting valleys and ridges. This coral can be distinguished from the similar but less common Platygyra lamellina by the fact that the valleys are wider and the walls between them have more vertical sides and have flatter tops.

== Distribution and habitat ==
Platygyra daedalea is a common species with a widespread distribution in the Indo-Pacific region. Its range extends from Madagascar, the east coast of Africa, the Red Sea and the Gulf of Aden, to Australia, Indonesia, Japan and the South China Sea. It is present in various reef environments, particularly on back reef slopes, from subtidal rocks down to about 30 metres (100 ft). It is particularly common in the Gulf of Thailand and South China Sea.

== Ecology ==
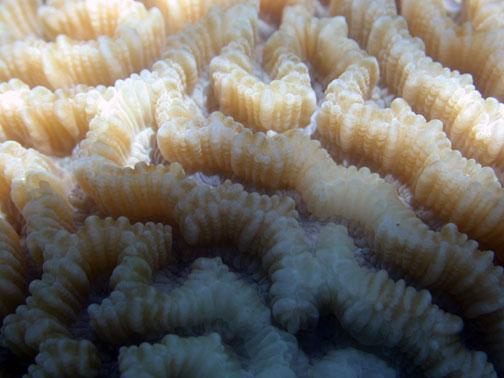
P. daedalea with polyps expanded

The polyps of P. daedalea expand at night to catch planktonic particles floating by. However, this coral obtains most of its nourishment from the dinoflagellates known as zooxanthellae it houses within its tissues. These provide organic carbon and nitrogen, the products of photosynthesis, to their host. To benefit from this symbiotic arrangement, P. daedalea needs to grow in shallow, sunlit environments.

Platygyra daedalea is an aggressive coral and seeks to prevent competitors from overshadowing it. Researchers placed small colonies of this species alongside similar-sized colonies of the less-aggressive Favites complanata. Some of the tentacles of P. daedalea developed into sweeper tentacles which then inflicted damage on the soft tissues of the adjoining F. complanata. These sweeper tentacles were up to 90 millimetres (3.5 in) in length, about fifteen times as long as a normal tentacle, and well armed with cnidocytes. The soft tissue damage was extensive, the skeleton was laid bare in places and sponges, algae and other fouling organisms grew on it. Three of the ten corals that were attacked eventually died.
