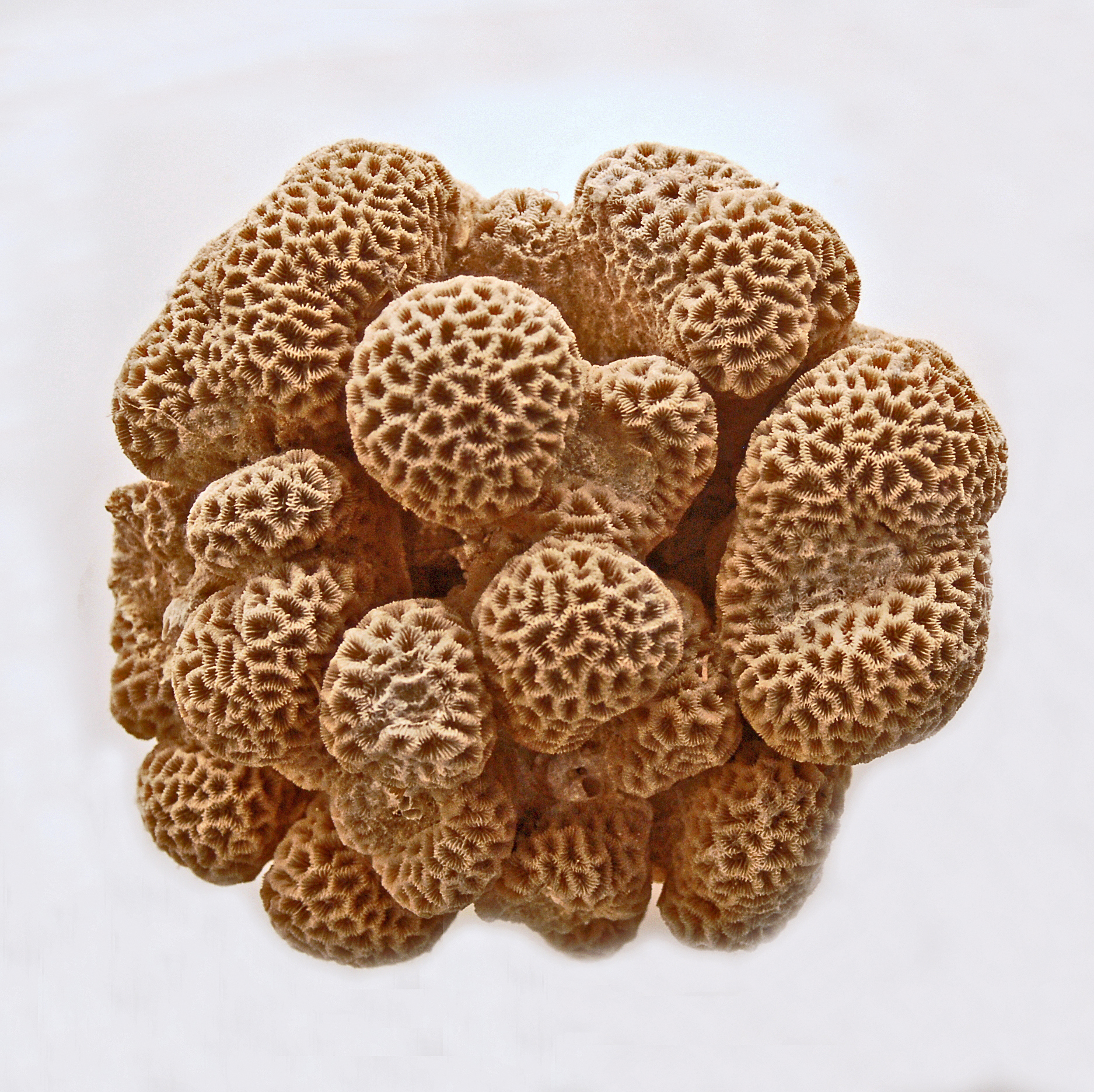
- Goniastrea retiformis

Scientific classification
- Kingdom: Animalia
- Phylum: Cnidaria
- Subphylum: Anthozoa
- Class: Hexacorallia
- Order: Scleractinia
- Family: Merulinidae
- Genus: Goniastrea; Milne-Edwards & Haime, 1848

Synonyms
- Goniastraea Milne Edwards & Haime, 1848 [lapsus]

= Goniastrea =

Genus of corals

Goniastrea is a genus of stony corals in the family Merulinidae. Species belonging to the genus Goniastrea forms massive colonies, usually spherical or elongate, with well developed paliform lobes. Polyps can be seen only at night.

== Species ==
The following species are currently recognized by the World Register of Marine Species :

- Goniastrea columella Crossland, 1948
- Goniastrea edwardsi Chevalier, 1971
- Goniastrea favulus (Dana, 1846)
- Goniastrea minuta Veron, 2002
- Goniastrea pectinata (Ehrenberg, 1834)
- Goniastrea ramosa Veron, 2002
- Goniastrea retiformis (Lamarck, 1816)
- Goniastrea stelligera (Dana, 1846)
- Goniastrea thecata Veron, DeVantier & Turak, 2002
