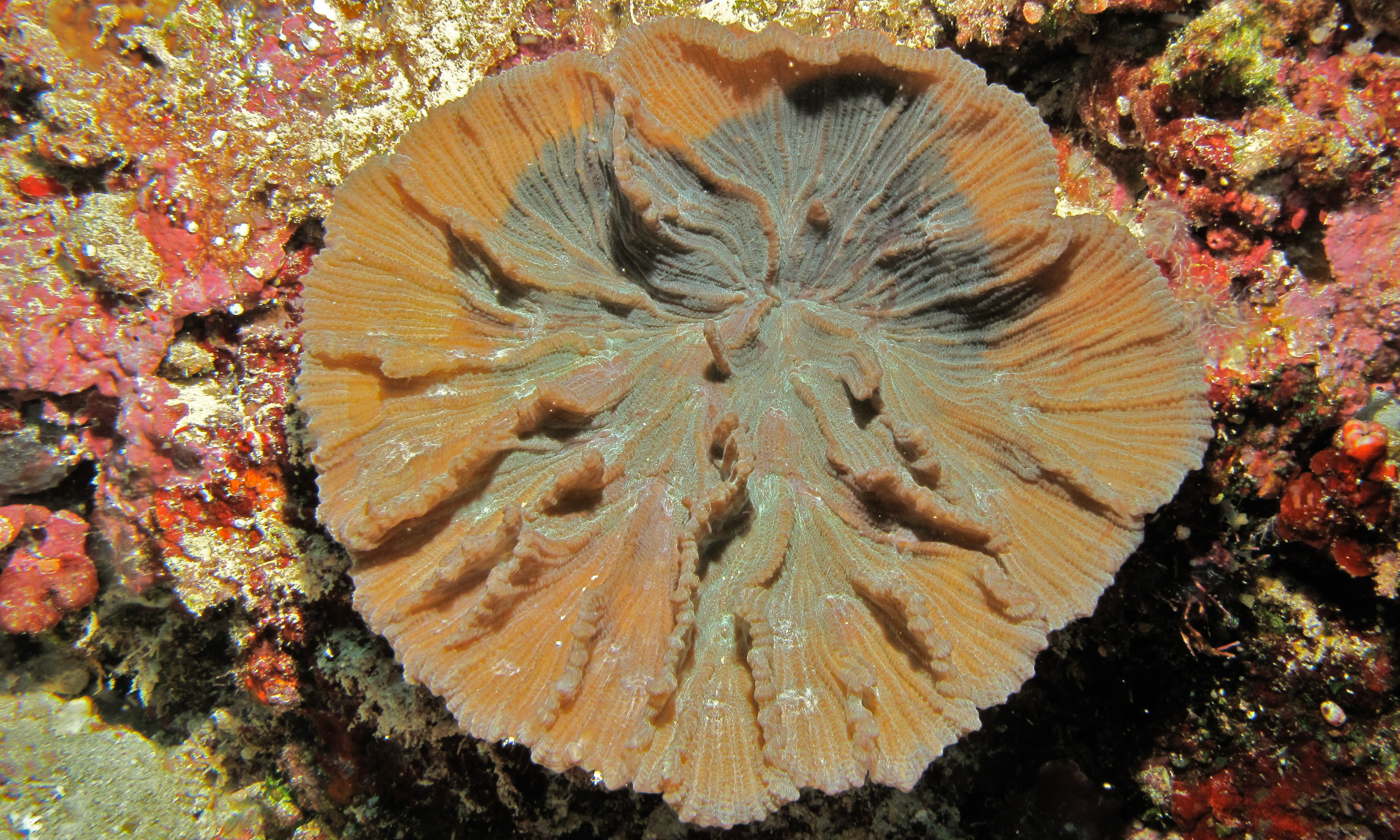
- Hibiscus Coral (Pectinia paeonia)

Scientific classification
- Domain: Eukaryota
- Kingdom: Animalia
- Phylum: Cnidaria
- Subphylum: Anthozoa
- Class: Hexacorallia
- Order: Scleractinia
- Family: Merulinidae
- Genus: Pectinia; Blainville, 1825

= Pectinia =

Genus of corals

Pectinia is a genus of corals belonging to the family Merulinidae.

Species:

- Pectinia africana Veron, 2000
- Pectinia alcicornis (Saville Kent, 1871)
- Pectinia crassa Ditlev, 2003
- Pectinia elongata (Rehberg, 1892)
- Pectinia lactuca (Pallas, 1766)
- Pectinia laxa Nemenzo, 1983
- Pectinia maxima (Moll & Best, 1984)
- Pectinia paeonia (Dana, 1846)
- Pectinia pygmaea Veron, 2000
- Pectinia teres Nemenzo & Montecillo, 1981
