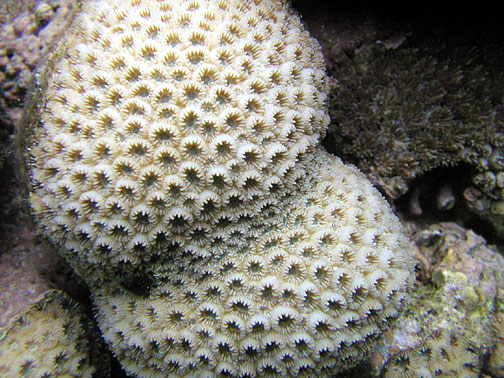
- Astrea curta

Scientific classification
- Kingdom: Animalia
- Phylum: Cnidaria
- Subphylum: Anthozoa
- Class: Hexacorallia
- Order: Scleractinia
- Family: Merulinidae; Verrill, 1865

Genera
- See text

Synonyms
- List: Pectiniidae; Trachyphyllidae Wells, 1956; Trachyphylliidae Verrill, 1901

= Merulinidae =

Family of corals

Merulinidae is a family of reef-building stony corals.

== Characteristics ==
All the genera in this family are colonial, reef-building corals. Skeletal structures are similar to those of Faviidae but are highly fused, without paliform lobes. The valleys are superficial or may be indistinct because of fan-like spreading or contortions in the ridges. Faviidae and Trachyphylliidae are the most closely related families.

== Genera ==
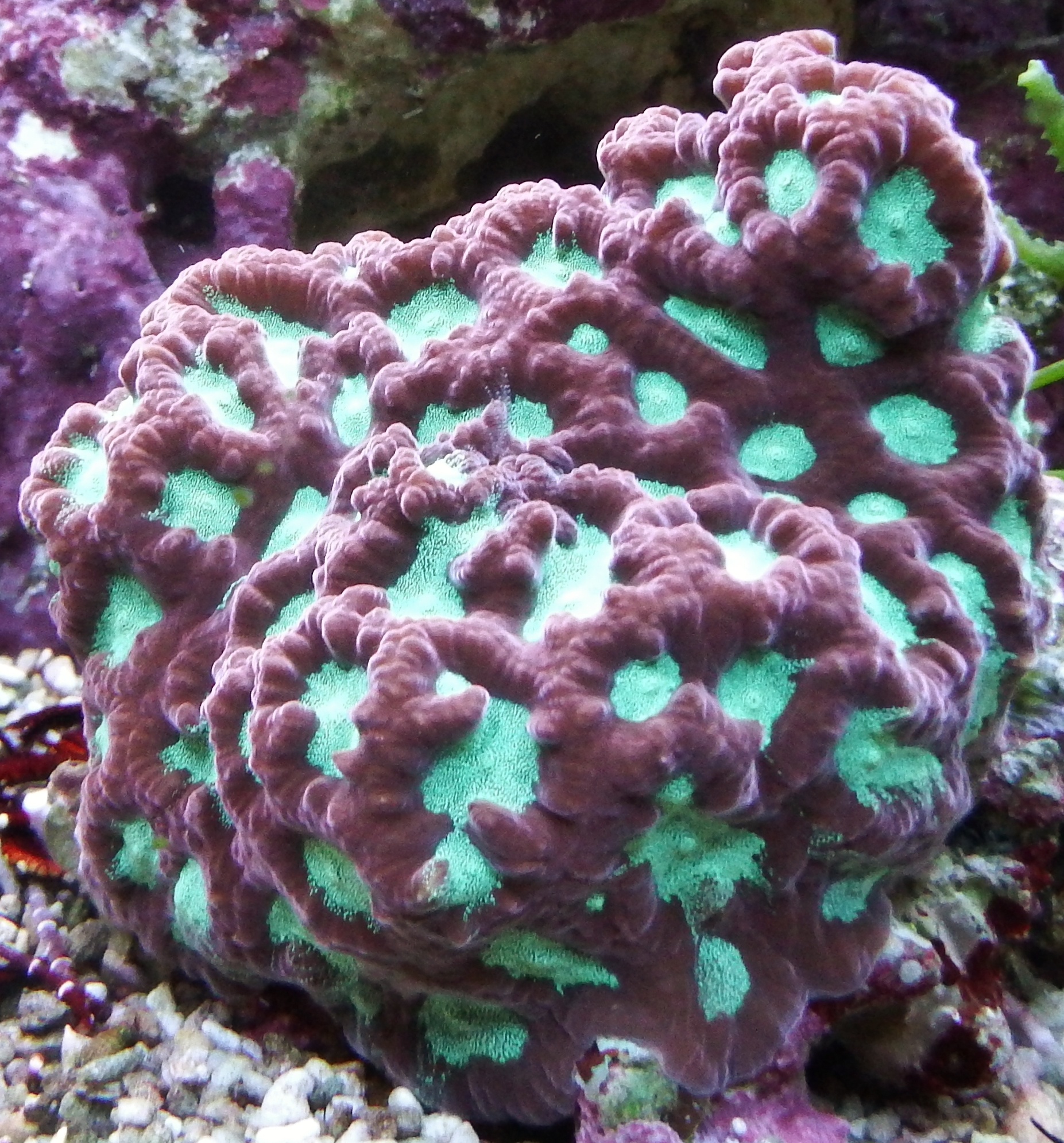
Favites pentagona

The World Register of Marine Species includes these genera in the family:

- Astrea Lamarck, 1801
- Australogyra Veron & Pichon, 1982
- Boninastrea Yabe & Sugiyama, 1935
- Caulastraea Dana, 1846
- Coelastrea Verrill, 1866
- Cyphastrea Milne Edwards & Haime, 1848
- Dipsastraea Blainville, 1830
- Echinopora Lamarck, 1816
- Erythrastrea Pichon, Scheer & Pillai, 1983
- Favites Link, 1807
- Goniastrea Milne Edwards & Haime, 1848
- Hydnophora Fischer von Waldheim, 1807
- Hydnophyllia † Reis, 1889
- Isastraea† Milne Edwards & Haime, 1851
- Leptoria Milne Edwards & Haime, 1848
- Merulina Ehrenberg, 1834
- Mycedium Milne Edwards & Haime, 1851
- Orbicella Dana, 1846
- Oulophyllia Milne Edwards & Haime, 1848
- Paragoniastrea Huang, Benzoni & Budd, 2014
- Paraleptoria† Budd & Bosellini, 2016
- Paramontastraea Huang & Budd, 2014
- Pectinia Blainville, 1825
- Physophyllia Duncan, 1884
- Platygyra Ehrenberg, 1834
- Scapophyllia Milne Edwards & Haime, 1848
- Trachyphyllia Milne Edwards & Haime, 1849
