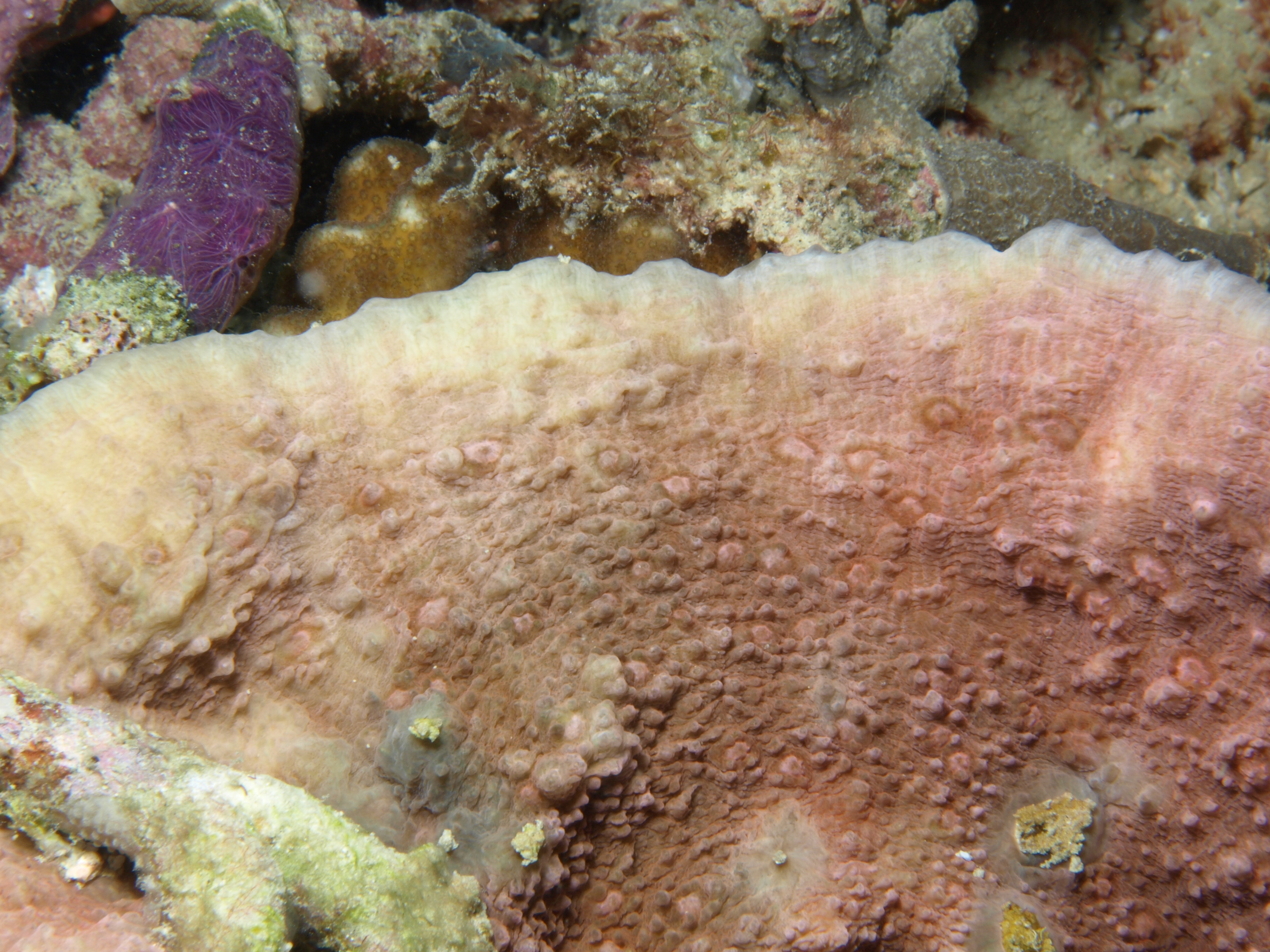

Conservation status
- Least Concern (IUCN 3.1)

Scientific classification
- Kingdom: Animalia
- Phylum: Cnidaria
- Subphylum: Anthozoa
- Class: Hexacorallia
- Order: Scleractinia
- Family: Lobophylliidae
- Genus: Oxypora
- Species: O. glabra

Binomial name
- Oxypora glabra Nemenzo, 1959

= Oxypora glabra =

Species of coral

Oxypora glabra is a species of large polyp stony coral in the family Lobophylliidae. It is a colonial coral with thin encrusting laminae. It is native to the central Indo-Pacific.

== Description ==
Oxypora glabra is a species of scleractinia coral, otherwise known as stony or hard coral, and part of the family Lobophylliidae, which is characteristic of robust coral colonies. Corals are extremely plastic organisms in that their structures rely on their environment, making construction widely variable. O. glabra colonies are dark brown in color and have an encrusting laminae, or "plate", formation with twisted septa that form short, clockwise spiral structures . The size of plating in O. glabra ranges between relatively small (<20 cm) to relatively large (>1m) throughout its depth distribution. The distribution of costae, a rib-like structure, is numerous at the center of the coral colony and declines moving out toward the edges. The corallite diameter is small and not as widely spaced as other Oxypora species. Corals are often described by their morphological variation. This is problematic in the case of O. glabra because Lobophylliidae consists of 12 genera including Echinophyllia, which is often mistaken for species in the Oxypora genera. Because there is a history of insufficient descriptions of O. glabra, a molecular approach is needed to delaminate the scleractinia coral. In a 2016 study analyzing Indo-Pacific corals genotypes, shared haplotypes suggest O. glabra is more closely related to species in the Echinophyllia genera than those in Oxypora. Additional studies are needed in order to formally move O. glabra from the latter genus to the former.

== Distribution ==
O. glabra is found throughout the Indo-Pacific and heavily concentrated in the mesophotic zone. The plating coral can be found as shallow as 3 meters, but commonly dominates the lower mesophotic zone (60m-80m) due to its structure and large surface area that absorbs the limited light available at those depths. On a vertically structured reef, O. glabra is rarely found at depths below 90 meters, but on a gradually sloping reef it can be as deep as 110–125 m where there is more exposure to irradiance. O. glabra is more common on the outer slope of Indo-Pacific reefs, including the Great Barrier Reef, and is generally found in sheltered areas.

== Reproduction ==
Corals are made up of soft-bodied animals that form polyps. The multiplication of polyps through either intracellular or extracellular budding leads to the formations of coral colonies. As an Indo-Pacific hermatypic, or reef building, coral, O. glabra is subject to a phenomenon known as mass spawning. As sea temperature rises during the spring, many coral species in the Great Barrier Reef synchronize the release of their gametes. The spawning occurs at night for several consecutive days and is the most common way in which scleractinian corals externally fertilize. The reason for this phenomenon is still widely unknown, but its importance is evident; whole populations of coral species engage in this action annually.

== Threats ==
Corals are susceptible to environmental and human impacts. When anthropogenic pollution causes ocean temperatures to rise, corals' symbiotic algae, called zooxanthellae, expel from the coral in a process commonly known as "bleaching" that ultimately kills the organism. A 1990 study conducted an experiment testing the effects of sedimentation of Indo-Pacific reef corals. Sediment deposits occur naturally, but can be expedited by humans through invasive processes such as dredging. O. glabra was found to be especially susceptible to sedimentation as sections of the coral layered with sediment underwent tissue necrosis that was ultimately fatal to the scleractinian coral. Exposing coral to the antibiotic tetracycline prevented some coral mortality, suggesting that the bacteria involved in tissue necrosis is tetracycline-sensitive.
