= Lobed cactus coral =

Lobed cactus coral may refer to two similar species of coral:

- Lobophyllia corymbosa
- Lobophyllia hemprichii
