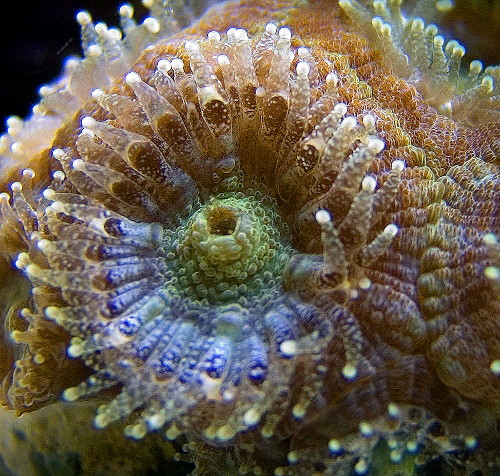

Conservation status
- Endangered (IUCN 3.1)

Scientific classification
- Kingdom: Animalia
- Phylum: Cnidaria
- Subphylum: Anthozoa
- Class: Hexacorallia
- Order: Scleractinia
- Family: Lobophylliidae
- Genus: Micromussa
- Species: M. lordhowensis

Binomial name
- Micromussa lordhowensis (Veron & Pichon, 1982)

Synonyms
- Acanthastrea lordhowensis Veron & Pichon, 1982

= Micromussa lordhowensis =

Species of coral

Micromussa lordhowensis, previously known as the Acan Lord, is a species of stony coral in the family Lobophylliidae. It is a widespread and common coral with large polyps occurring on shallow reefs in the Indo-Pacific Ocean. It was originally classified under the genus Acanthastrea, and reclassified under the genus Micromussa in 2016.

== Description ==
Micromussa lordhowensis is a colonial coral forming low clumps that can be two metres (yards) across. The corallites are large, up to 15 mm (0.6 in) in diameter, with walls composed of closely packed septa with fine teeth. The columella is well-developed. The colour varies widely and is often formed of two contrasting shades of red, orange, purple, blue or green.

== Reclassification ==
Micromussa lordhowensis was studied for the first time from a phylogenetic perspective and transferred to Micromussa as it was found to be unrelated to the genus type, A. echinata, but closely related to the other species in Micromussa. Furthermore, morphological analyses confirmed that Micromussa lordhowensis displays the septal size, shape, and granulation typical of all Micromussa species rather than the smoother septal sides ornamentation of Acanthastrea.

== Distribution ==
Micromussa lordhowensis occurs in the western Indo-Pacific on reefs at depths down to about 30 metres (98 ft). Its range extends from the Red Sea, the Gulf of Aqaba and the eastern coast of Africa to the East China Sea, Japan and Australia. It takes its specific name from Lord Howe Island, the most southerly coral reef in the Pacific. There it is found among about 83 recorded species of stony coral which include many tropical species at the southern limits of their range, along with subtropical species not found on the nearby Great Barrier Reef.

== Biology ==
Micromussa lordhowensis is a hermaphrodite and a broadcast spawner. The larvae form part of the plankton and drift with the ocean currents, eventually settling on the seabed. In an experiment designed to find out how long the larvae could survive, Micromussa lordhowensis larvae were reared in an aquarium. It was found that the larvae could remain alive in the water after they were fully developed for up to a further 78 days before settling. In the ocean, this allows the larvae to disperse widely and have greater chances of finding optimum sites for settling.

The polyps of Micromussa lordhowensis are large and fleshy. When the tentacles are extended, they search for zooplankton and small invertebrates which are transferred to the mouth when caught. Another source of energy is the symbiotic dinoflagellates, microscopic algae that live within the coral's tissues and which produce nutrients by photosynthesis. The coral is able to benefit from the carbohydrates produced by the algae and the algae for their part make use of the coral's nitrogenous waste products. Micromussa lordhowensis is an aggressive species of coral and defends itself against the possibility of being overshadowed. At night some polyps extend long filaments which secrete enzymes which digest the cells of other organisms with which they come in contact.

== Status ==
The IUCN Red List of Threatened Species lists certain subspecies of coral as being "Near Threatened". In the main however it is a common species that is widely distributed and seems to be more resilient than some other species. Recent studies of the population size have been done documenting huge colonies of this coral species in most coral growing regions of the world. Many colorful species of this coral are popular in the aquarium trade for its colorful exemplars and hardiness. The coral grows and propagates rapidly in captive reef environments and thrives under lighting and flow conditions that other Mussidae would not survive. It is best known recently as a "trend coral" that commands high prices in the reef trade that are not related to its rarity, population or accessibility. In the wild, the chief threat it is likely to face is from predation by coral eating organisms such as parrot fish and starfish and the degradation of its reef habitat. It may disappear entirely from some degraded reefs and, along with other coral species, is likely to be adversely affected by ocean acidification and climate change.
