= Homophyllia bowerbanki =

Conservation status
- Near Threatened (IUCN 3.1)

Scientific classification
- Kingdom: Animalia
- Phylum: Cnidaria
- Subphylum: Anthozoa
- Class: Hexacorallia
- Order: Scleractinia
- Family: Lobophylliidae
- Genus: Homophyllia
- Species: H. bowerbanki

Binomial name
- Homophyllia bowerbanki (Milne Edwards & Haime, 1851)

Synonyms
- List: Acanthastraea angulosa Brüggemann, 1879; Acanthastrea angulosa Brüggemann, 1879; Acanthastrea bowerbanki Milne Edwards, 1857; Acanthastrea hillae Wells, 1955

Species of coral

Homophyllia bowerbanki is a vulnerable species of coral found in the Pacific and Indian Oceans. This species is moderately common, but it is threatened by crown-of-thorns starfish predation and habitat loss.

== Description ==
Homophyllia bowerbanki is a small, encrusting coral but occasionally reach a diameter of over 1.5 metres (4.9 ft). The corallites are cerioid and have irregular shapes, and there is usually an obvious central one. The colour is often mottled and is generally reddish-brown, brown or grey. The corallites are irregularly shaped and may be arranged singly or in short valleys with continuous walls containing several corallites. The polyps are still fleshy when retracted.

== Distribution ==
It is found in the Pacific and Indian Oceans from Australia to Japan and Kiribati.

== Biology ==
Homophyllia bowerbanki is a zooxanthellate species of coral. It obtains most of its nutritional needs from the symbiotic dinoflagellates that live inside its soft tissues. These photosynthetic organisms provide the coral with organic carbon and nitrogen, sometimes providing up to 90% of their host's energy needs for metabolism and growth. Its remaining needs are met by the planktonic organisms caught by the tentacles of the polyps.

== Status ==
This coral has a wide range is moderately common throughout its range. It is susceptible to attack by the crown of thorns starfish. The main threats faced by corals in general are related to climate change and the mechanical destruction of their coral reef habitats; increasing damage from extreme weather events, rising sea water temperatures and ocean acidification. The International Union for Conservation of Nature has assessed the conservation status of this species as being "near-threatened species". All corals receive protection by being listed on CITES Appendix II.
