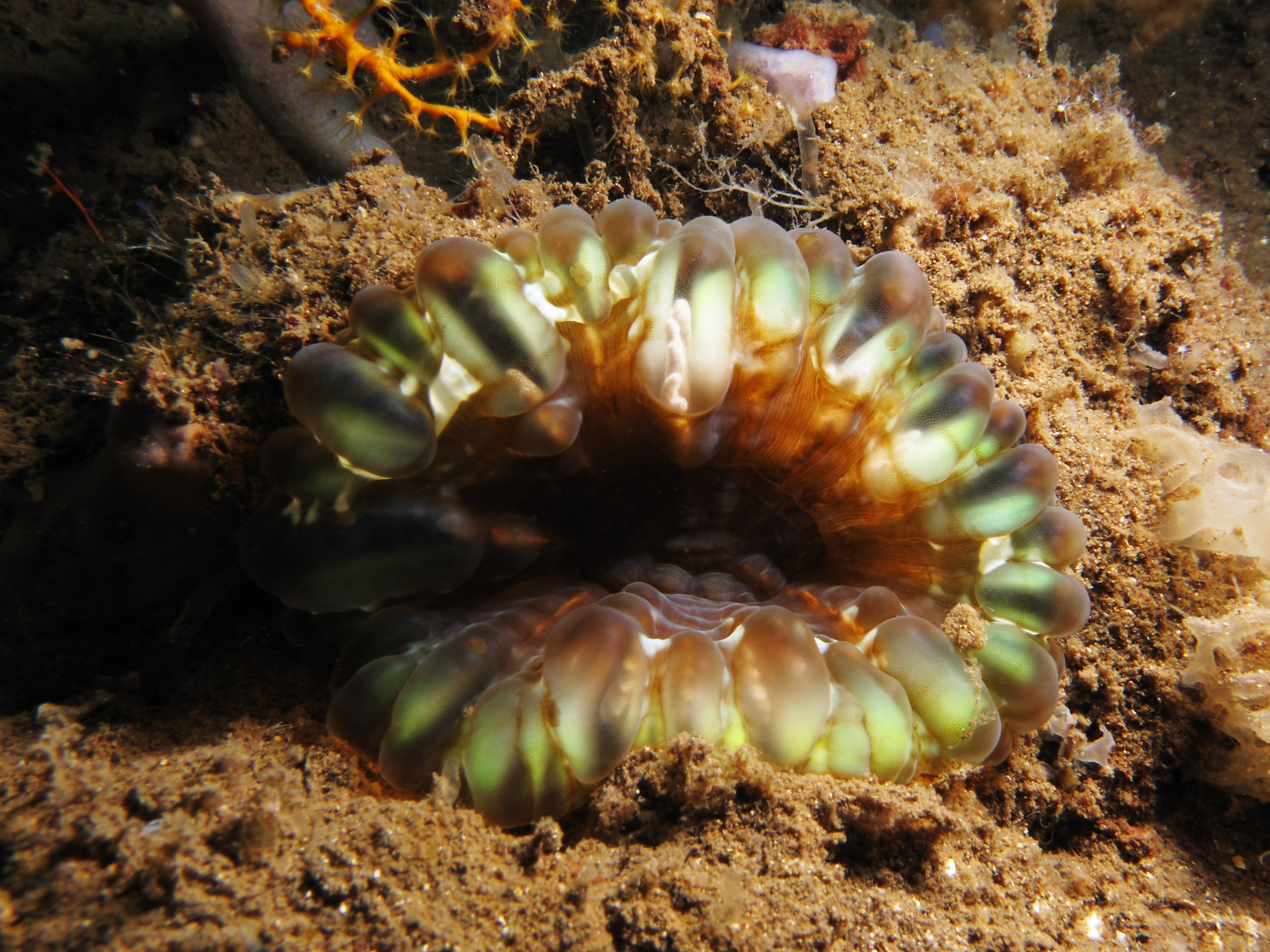
- Cynarina lacrymalis at Sumbawa, Indonesia

Conservation status
- Least Concern (IUCN 3.1)

Scientific classification
- Kingdom: Animalia
- Phylum: Cnidaria
- Subphylum: Anthozoa
- Class: Hexacorallia
- Order: Scleractinia
- Family: Lobophylliidae
- Genus: Cynarina
- Species: C. lacrymalis

Binomial name
- Cynarina lacrymalis (Milne Edwards & Haime, 1848)

Synonyms
- List: Acanthophyllia deshayensiana (Michelin, 1850) [lapsus]; Acanthophyllia deshayesiana (Michelin, 1850); Antillia grandiflora Gerth, 1921 †; Antillia japonica Yabe & Sugiyama, 1931; Antillia nomaensis Yabe & Sugiyama, 1931; Caryophyllia carduus Audouin, 1826; Caryophyllia deshayesiana Michelin, 1850; Caryophyllia lacrymalis Milne Edwards & Haime, 1848; Cynarina lacrimalis (Milne Edwards & Haime, 1848) [lapsus]; Cynarina savignyi Brüggemann, 1877; Lithophyllia lacrymalis (Milne Edwards & Haime, 1848); Lithophyllia palata Gardiner, 1899; Lithophyllia verbeeki† Gerth, 1921; Mussa (Lithophyllia) lacrymalis (Milne Edwards & Haime, 1848); Protolobophyllia japonica (Yabe & Sugiyama, 1931); Protolobophyllia sinica Ma, 1959; Rhodocyathus ceylonensis Bourne, 1905; Scolymia lacrymalis (Milne Edwards & Haime, 1848)

= Cynarina lacrymalis =

Species of coral

Cynarina lacrymalis is a species of stony coral in the family Lobophylliidae. It is variously known as the flat cup coral, solitary cup coral, button coral, doughnut coral, or cat's eye coral. It is found in the western Indo-Pacific Ocean and is sometimes kept in reef aquaria.

== Description ==
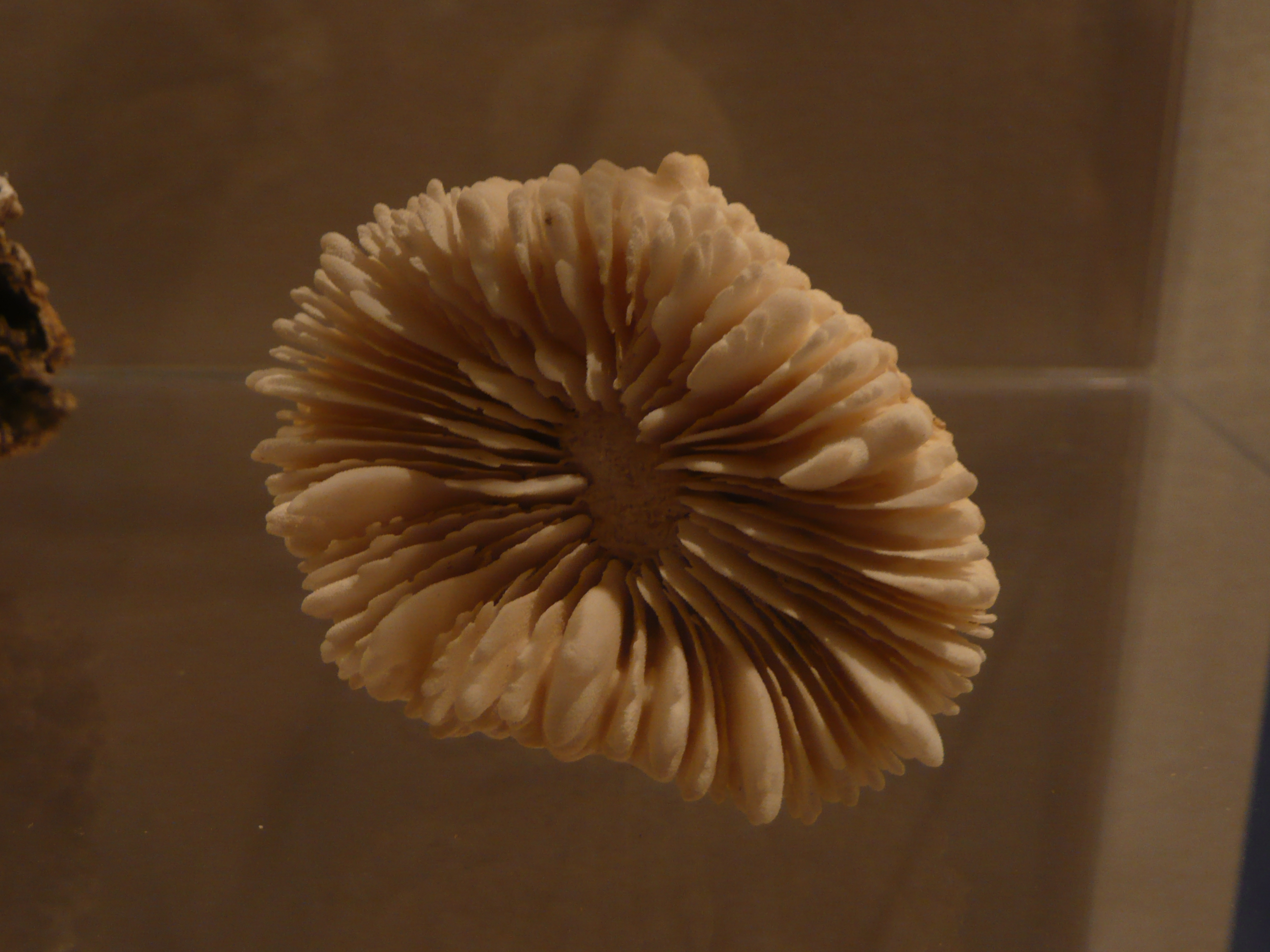
Cynarina lacrymalis skeleton

Cynarina lacrymalis is a large, solitary coral with a single polyp nestling in a corallite, the stony cup it has secreted. It can grow to a diameter of 10 cm (3.9 in) and a height of 8 cm (3.1 in). It is cylindrical with a round or oval upper surface. It is usually fixed to rock but has a pointed base and can be embedded in sand or survive unattached. There are twelve broad white radially arranged septa (ridges) joined to the corallite wall, with secondary septa between for a total of 96 septa. The coral's costae (continuations of the septa) alternate between thick and thin depending on the septa they are an extension of. They have large, rounded lobes and the central axial structure (columella) in the corallite is short and broad. The septa can be seen through the transparent, fleshy mantle which contains symbiotic flagellates known as zooxanthellae which give the coral its colour. This is usually pale brown or green, sometimes with a contrasting oral disc, but also sometimes pinkish or bluish. The colour depends on which species of zooxanthella take up residence. The coral has the ability to change its surface from glossy to dull but it is unclear why it does this. At night, when the polyp extends its many tentacles to feed, the coral resembles a sea anemone.

== Distribution and habitat ==
Cynarina lacrymalis is found in the Red Sea and Gulf of Aden, the east coast of Africa and the Seychelles. It is also found in Japan, Indonesia and northern and eastern Australia. It is found on shallow reefs and sandy seabeds with moderate water flow, down to depths of 40 metres (130 ft).

== Biology ==
Cynarina lacrymalis orientates itself so that its cup surface is parallel to the surface to which it is fastened, and sways with the water's flow. During the day, the mantle tissues absorb water and swell up. This increases the area exposed to the light and may double the coral's diameter. The zooxanthellae are photosynthetic and use sunlight to create organic compounds. These provide most of the coral's energy needs. However, during the night, the tentacles of the polyp are extended to trap planktonic particles floating past and these supplement the nutrition it obtains from photosynthesis.

This coral is a hermaphrodite and reproduces by releasing eggs and sperm into the water where fertilisation takes place. Cynarina lacrimosa begins sex cell development in late summer, around August, and spawns in April. The coral's gonads are contained in the mesentery, but not kept separate. The species produces a large amount of oocytes per polyp compared to others in the same habitats. The planula larvae which emerge from the eggs are planktonic and eventually settle on the seabed to undergo metamorphosis into juvenile polyps. Under conditions of poor light, the coral sometimes reproduces asexually, part of the disc becoming detached and growing into a new individual.

== Use in aquaria ==
Cynarina lacyrmalis as a species is used in aquaria. It has been propagated in captivity and is relatively easy to care for, though its slow growth rate makes it a niche species and rather expensive. In captivity, the species needs moderate light and can be supplementally fed with meaty foods like brine shrimp, krill, or chunks of fish. The species is not aggressive but should be kept away from other corals as it could be overtaken.
