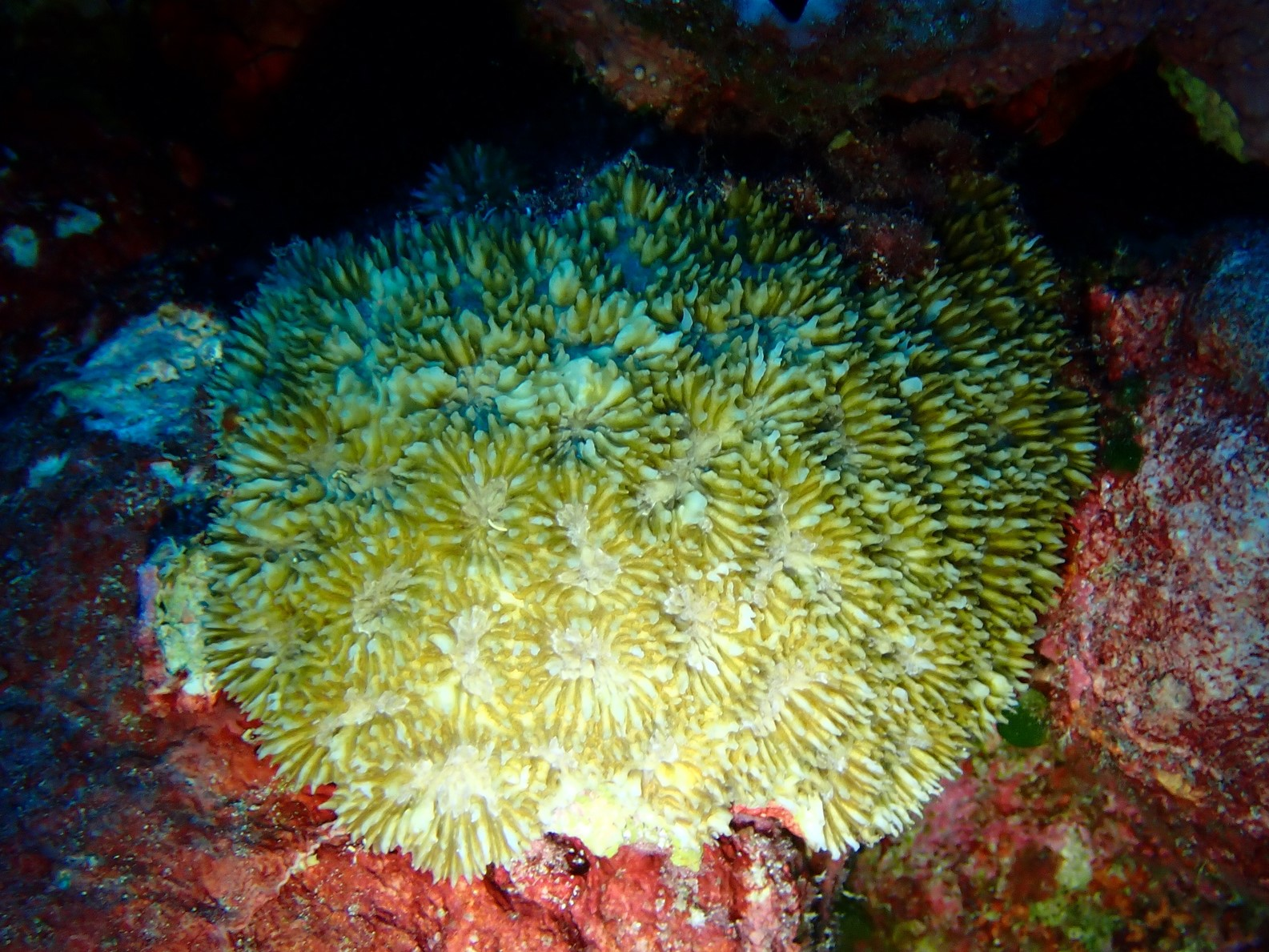

Conservation status
- Least Concern (IUCN 3.1)

Scientific classification
- Kingdom: Animalia
- Phylum: Cnidaria
- Subphylum: Anthozoa
- Class: Hexacorallia
- Order: Scleractinia
- Family: Lobophylliidae
- Genus: Lobophyllia
- Species: L. ishigakiensis

Binomial name
- Lobophyllia ishigakiensis (Veron, 1990)

Synonyms
- Acanthastrea ishigakiensis Veron, 1990

= Lobophyllia ishigakiensis =

Species of coral

Lobophyllia ishigakiensis is a species of coral found in Indo-Pacific waters. It is widespread but uncommon throughout its range. It has a narrow depth range, and is susceptible to coral bleaching and disease. It is also threatened by the global loss of coral reef habitats.

== Distribution and habitat ==
Lobophyllia ishigakiensis is found in the Indo-Pacific region. Its range extends from Madagascar and the east coast of Africa, the Red Sea and the Gulf of Aden, to Japan, the East China Sea, Samoa and Australia. It is found in sheltered areas of reefs away from direct wave action to depths of 15 or 20 metres (49 or 66 ft).

== Biology ==
Lobophyllia ishigakiensis is a zooxanthellate species of coral. It obtains most of its nutritional needs from the symbiotic dinoflagellates that live inside its soft tissues. These photosynthetic organisms provide the coral with organic carbon and nitrogen, sometimes providing up to 90% of their host's energy needs for metabolism and growth. Its remaining needs are met by the planktonic organisms caught by the tentacles of the polyps.

== Status ==
This coral has a wide range but is rare throughout its range. It is particularly susceptible to coral bleaching and to coral diseases. The main threats faced by corals in general are related to climate change and the mechanical destruction of their coral reef habitats; increasing damage from extreme weather events, rising sea water temperatures and ocean acidification. The International Union for Conservation of Nature has assessed the conservation status of this species as being "vulnerable". All corals receive protection by being listed on CITES Appendix II.
