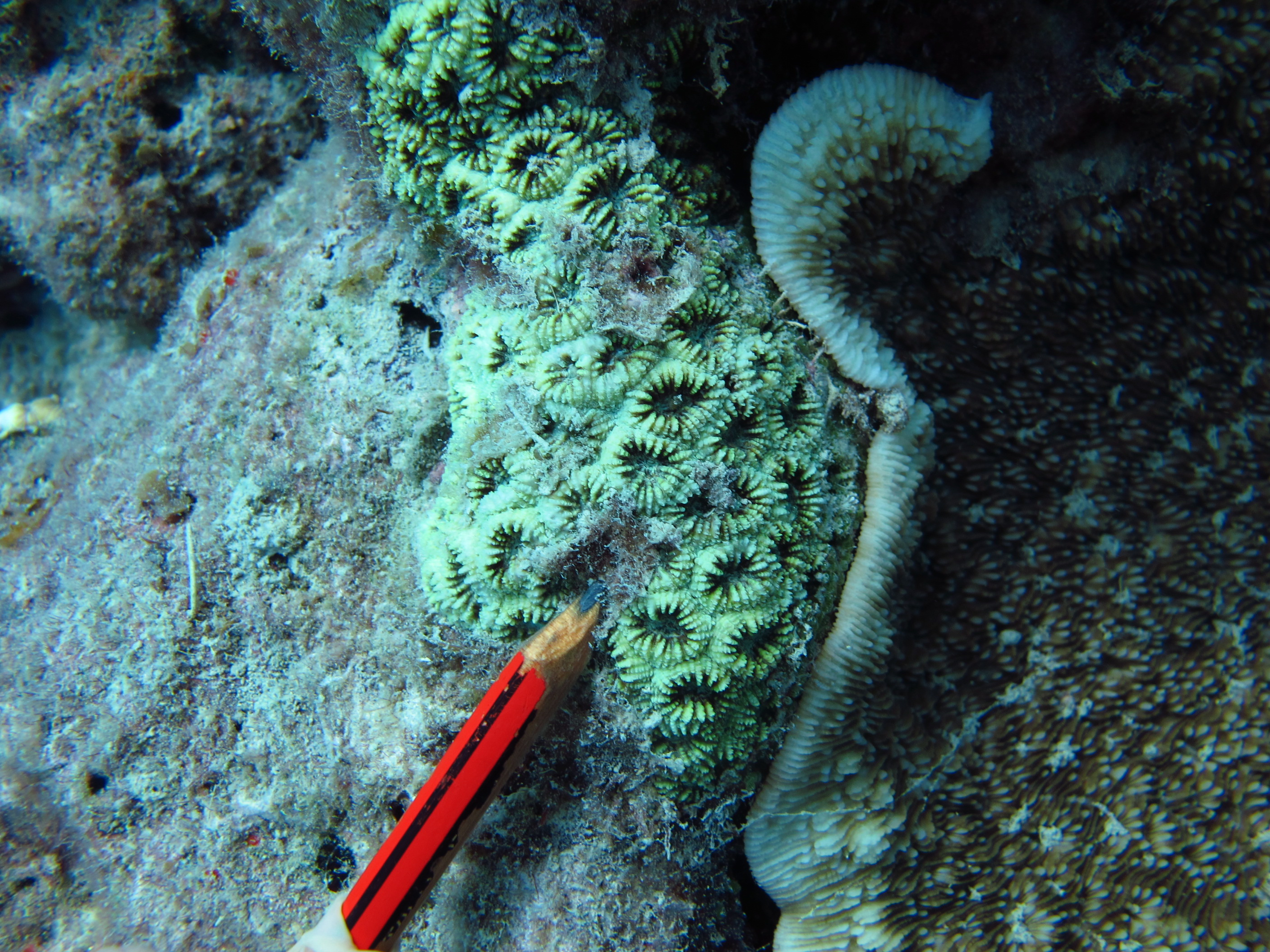

Conservation status
- Least Concern (IUCN 3.1)

Scientific classification
- Kingdom: Animalia
- Phylum: Cnidaria
- Subphylum: Anthozoa
- Class: Hexacorallia
- Order: Scleractinia
- Family: Lobophylliidae
- Genus: Micromussa
- Species: M. regularis

Binomial name
- Micromussa regularis (Veron, 2000)

Synonyms
- Acanthastrea regularis

= Micromussa regularis =

Species of coral

Micromussa regularis is a species of coral found in Indo-Pacific waters from Australia to the western Pacific Ocean. It is usually uncommon throughout its range, but can be more common locally. It has a narrow depth range, and so is susceptible to coral bleaching and disease. It is also threatened by the global decline in coral reef habitats.

== Description ==
Colonies of Micromussa regularis are massive. The corallites are subplacoid and are irregularly placed. The septa are neatly arranged, with the teeth on adjacent septa often aligned creating concentric rings. The skeleton is not covered with fleshy tissue and the colony colour is brownish or yellowish-brown, often with the floor of the corallites and the corallite walls being contrasting colours.

== Biology ==
Micromussa regularis is a zooxanthellate species of coral. It obtains most of its nutritional needs from the symbiotic dinoflagellates that live inside its soft tissues. These photosynthetic organisms provide the coral with organic carbon and nitrogen, sometimes providing up to 90% of their host's energy needs for metabolism and growth. Its remaining needs are met by the planktonic organisms caught by the tentacles of the polyps.

== Status ==
This coral has a fairly wide range but is uncommon throughout most of its range although locally common in places. Its population trend is unknown but it is likely to be declining. It is particularly susceptible to coral bleaching and to coral diseases. The main threats faced by corals in general are related to climate change and the mechanical destruction of their coral reef habitats; increasing damage from extreme weather events, rising sea water temperatures and ocean acidification. The International Union for Conservation of Nature has assessed the conservation status of this species as being "vulnerable". All corals receive protection by being listed on CITES Appendix II.
