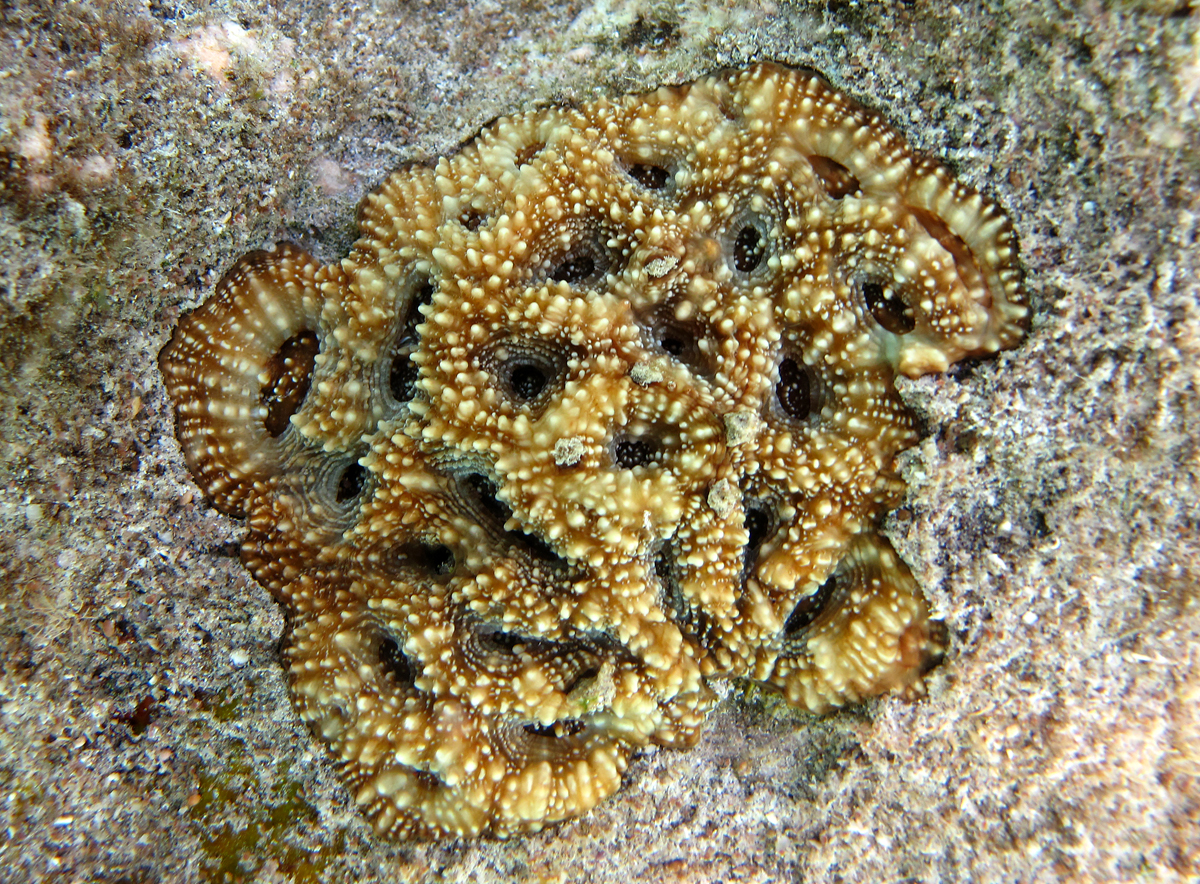

Conservation status
- Least Concern (IUCN 3.1)

Scientific classification
- Kingdom: Animalia
- Phylum: Cnidaria
- Subphylum: Anthozoa
- Class: Hexacorallia
- Order: Scleractinia
- Family: Lobophylliidae
- Genus: Acanthastrea
- Species: A. echinata

Binomial name
- Acanthastrea echinata Dana, 1846

Synonyms
- List: Acanthastrea grandis Milne Edwards & Haime, 1849; Acanthastrea hirsuta Milne Edwards, 1857; Acanthastrea spinosa Milne Edwards & Haime, 1848; Astraea echinata Dana, 1846 [lapsus]; Astrea echinata Dana, 1846; Astrea patula Dana, 1846; Favia hirsuta (Milne Edwards, 1857); Favites hirsuta (Milne Edwards, 1857)

= Acanthastrea echinata =

Species of coral

Acanthastrea echinata, commonly known as the starry cup coral, is a species of corals in the family Lobophylliidae. It is a wide-ranging species found from the western Indian Ocean, throughout the Pacific Ocean, and eastward to the southeastern Atlantic Ocean. It can inhabit any reef habitat to depths of 50 m. This species, which may become threatened with the global decline of coral reefs, is a popular coral used in aquariums.

== Description ==
A. echinata colonies crustlike to very thick and reach up to about a meter across. The thick-walled, circular corallites are cerioid or subplocoid. The septa have large teeth. The skeleton is covered with a folded fleshy tissue. They are usually dull in color, coming in shades of gray, brown, or green, but some can be bright and colorful. They are a uniform color or mottled.

== Conservation ==
This is a very widespread coral and the most common species in genus Acanthastrea. Like other corals, it is threatened by the overall loss of reef habitat, but its abundance makes it resilient as a species. It is also tolerant of a variety of reef habitat conditions, growing successfully at a range of depths and light levels. It is harvested from the wild for use in aquariums.
