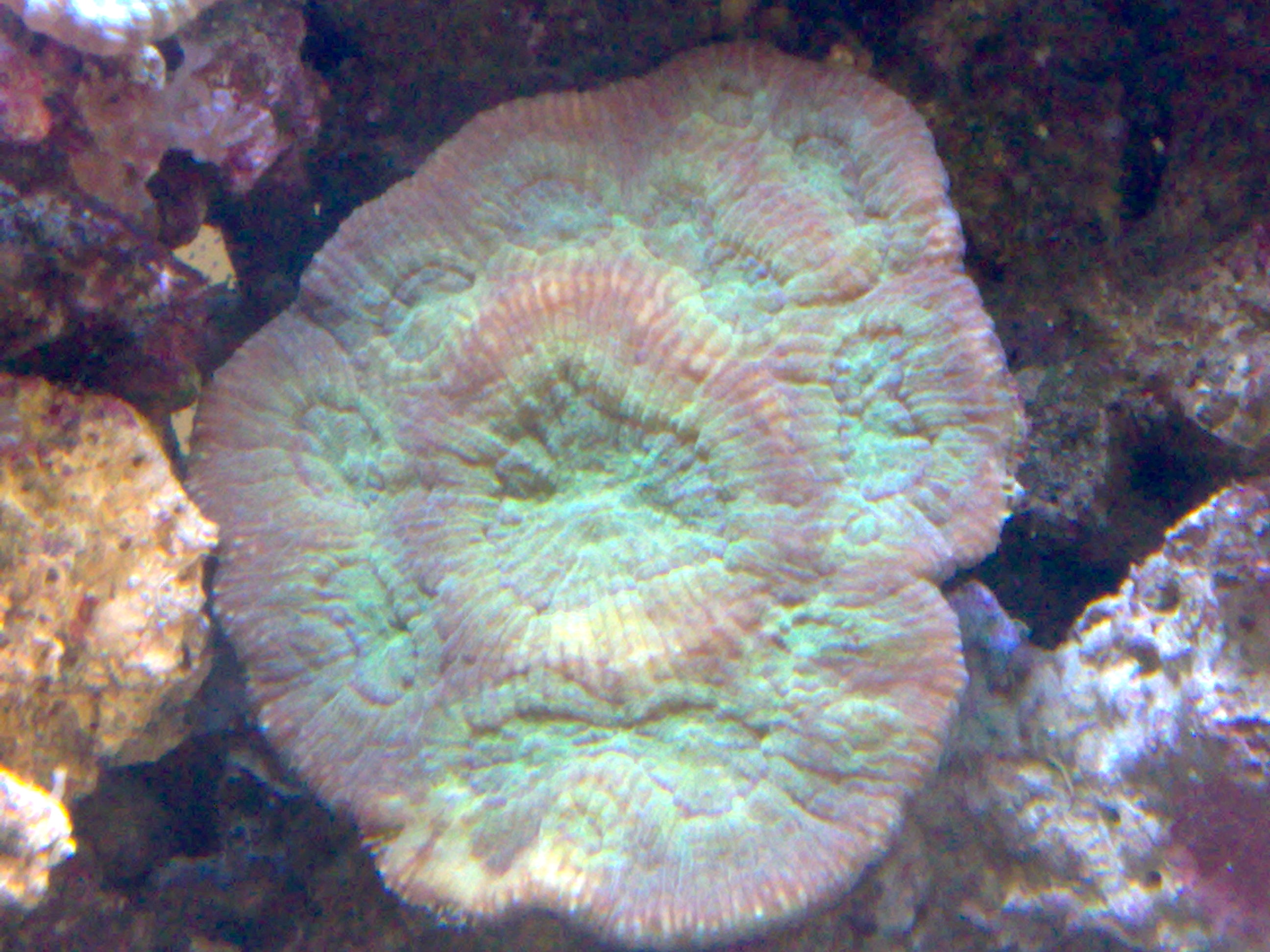
- Parascolymia rowleyensis in a marine reef aquarium

Conservation status
- Least Concern (IUCN 3.1)

Scientific classification
- Kingdom: Animalia
- Phylum: Cnidaria
- Subphylum: Anthozoa
- Class: Hexacorallia
- Order: Scleractinia
- Family: Lobophylliidae
- Genus: Lobophyllia
- Species: L. rowleyensis

Binomial name
- Lobophyllia rowleyensis (Veron, 1985)

Synonyms
- Australomussa rowleyensis Veron, 1985; Parascolymia rowleyensis (Veron, 1985)

= Lobophyllia rowleyensis =

Species of coral

Lobophyllia rowleyensis is a species of large polyp stony corals. The coral has a number of different color variations with the largest variety found in the northern part of its range near Indonesia.
