= Madrepora corymbosa =

Madrepora corymbosa is an unaccepted scientific name and may refer to two species of corals:

- Acropora cytherea as described by Lamarck, 1816
- Lobophyllia corymbosa as described by Forskål, 1775
