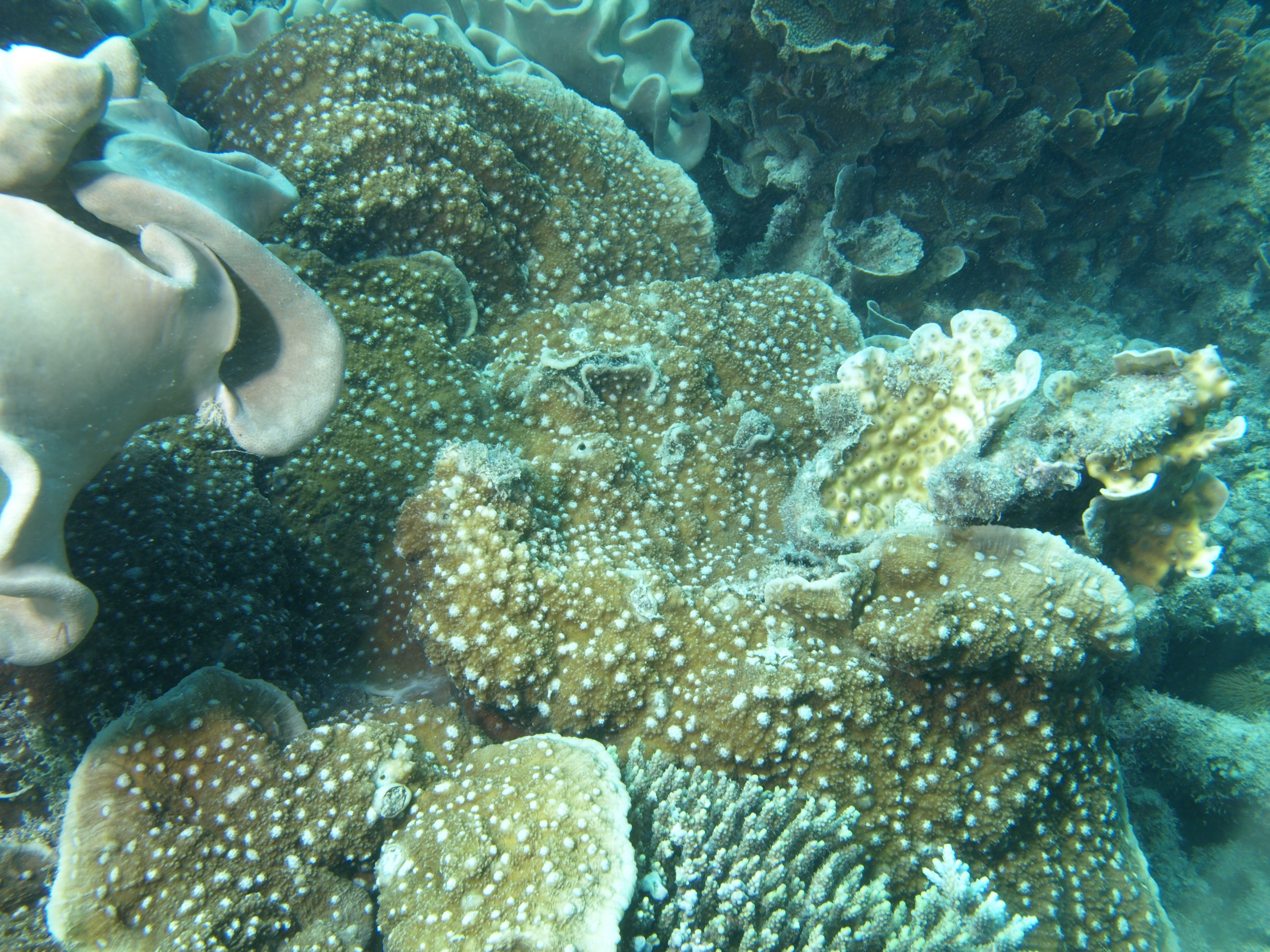

Conservation status
- Least Concern (IUCN 3.1)

Scientific classification
- Kingdom: Animalia
- Phylum: Cnidaria
- Subphylum: Anthozoa
- Class: Hexacorallia
- Order: Scleractinia
- Family: Lobophylliidae
- Genus: Oxypora
- Species: O. lacera

Binomial name
- Oxypora lacera (Verrill, 1864)

Synonyms
- List: Echinophyllia lacera (Verrill, 1864); Echinophyllia rugosa Chevalier, 1975; Oxypora contorta Quelch, 1886; Oxypora titizimaensis Yabe, Sugiyama & Eguchi, 1936; Trachypora lacera Verrill, 1864

= Oxypora lacera =

Species of coral

Oxypora lacera, the ragged chalice coral or porous lettuce coral, is a species of large polyp stony corals in the family Lobophylliidae. It is a colonial coral which can be submassive, encrusting or laminar. It is native to the western Indo-Pacific.

== Description ==
Colonies can adopt various forms, encrusting, plate-like or lumpy, sometimes varying in form in different parts of the same colony. On thin laminar plates, which may be a few millimetres thick, the corallites are delicate and about 5 mm (0.2 in) in diameter. Near the plate attachment the coral is thicker and the corallites are coarser. Septa-costae can be seen between the corallites, and the costae bear spines. The underside of the laminate plates are spiny and there are perforations in the plates. The colour of this coral is greyish-brown or grey, sometimes with a greenish tinge; the oral disc may have a complementary colour of red or green. Colonies seldom grow to a diameter of more than 30 cm (10 in). This coral can be confused with Echinophyllia aspera underwater.

== Distribution and habitat ==
O. lacera is native to the Indo-Pacific region. Its range extends from the Red Sea and Gulf of Aden to Japan, the South China Sea, and eastern, northern and western Australia. It grows on protected reef slopes down to about 30 m (100 ft), and to greater depths on outer reef slopes than on inner slopes. It is a common species, but is not conspicuous because of its drab colouring.

== Biology ==
This coral is a hermaphrodite. Gametes are shed into the body cavity and pass through the mouths of the polyps into the sea. After fertilisation, the planula larvae are planktonic for a time. When sufficiently developed, they start developing tentacles, a pharynx and septa before settling on the sea bed and completing metamorphosis.

== Status ==
Like other corals, the chief threats faced by this coral are from destruction of its reef habitat and the effects of global warming. However, it has a very wide range and is a common species, often found in deep water below 25 m (80 ft), so the International Union for Conservation of Nature has assessed its conservation status as being of "least concern".
