= Acanthastrea rotundoflora =

Conservation status
- Least Concern (IUCN 3.1)

Scientific classification
- Kingdom: Animalia
- Phylum: Cnidaria
- Subphylum: Anthozoa
- Class: Hexacorallia
- Order: Scleractinia
- Family: Lobophylliidae
- Genus: Acanthastrea
- Species: A. rotundoflora

Binomial name
- Acanthastrea rotundoflora Chevalier, 1975

Species of coral

Acanthastrea rotundoflora is a species of coral found in Indo-Pacific waters from the Red Sea to Australia and the East China Sea. The species in uncommon throughout its range, and is threatened by the global loss of coral reef habitats.

== Description ==
Colonies of Acanthastrea rotundoflora are either massive or encrusting. The corallites are plocoid and rather widely separated, and in small colonies there is a conspicuous central corallite. The septa have long pointed teeth. The general colour of this coral is rusty-brown, dark brown or green.

== Biology ==
Acanthastrea rotundoflora is a zooxanthellate species of coral. It obtains most of its nutritional needs from the symbiotic dinoflagellates that live inside its soft tissues. These photosynthetic organisms provide the coral with organic carbon and nitrogen, sometimes providing up to 90% of their host's energy needs for metabolism and growth. Its remaining needs are met by the planktonic organisms caught by the tentacles of the polyps.

== Status ==
This coral has a wide range and is moderately common. It is less susceptible to coral bleaching than some related species because it occurs in deeper water. The population trend for this species is unclear, but the main threats faced by corals in general are related to climate change and the mechanical destruction of their coral reef habitats; increasing damage from extreme weather events, rising sea water temperatures and ocean acidification. The International Union for Conservation of Nature has assessed the conservation status of this species as being a "Least concern species". All corals receive protection by being listed on CITES Appendix II.
