= Moseleya =

Moseleya may refer to:

- Moseleya (cnidarian), a genus of cnidarians in the family Lobophylliidae
- Moseleya, a genus of plants in the family Plantaginaceae, synonym of Ellisiophyllum
- Moseleya, a genus of fishes in the family Macrouridae, synonym of Coryphaenoides
