= Acanthastrea brevis =

Conservation status
- Least Concern (IUCN 3.1)

Scientific classification
- Kingdom: Animalia
- Phylum: Cnidaria
- Subphylum: Anthozoa
- Class: Hexacorallia
- Order: Scleractinia
- Family: Lobophylliidae
- Genus: Acanthastrea
- Species: A. brevis

Binomial name
- Acanthastrea brevis Milne Edwards & Haime, 1849

Species of coral

Acanthastrea brevis is a Least concern species of stony coral found in reef habitats at depths of 1–20 m (3 ft 3 in – 65 ft 7 in). It is threatened by habitat loss and crown-of-thorns starfish predation. It is particularly susceptible to coral bleaching and ocean acidification.

== Distribution ==
It is widespread and found from the waters of Madagascar and Saudi Arabia in the Indian Ocean to Micronesia and Samoa in the Pacific.

== Biology ==
Acanthastrea brevis is a zooxanthellate species of coral. It obtains most of its nutritional needs from the symbiotic dinoflagellates that live inside its soft tissues. Through a photosymbiotic relationship these photosynthetic organisms provide the coral with organic carbon and nitrogen, sometimes providing up to 90% of their host's energy needs for metabolism and growth. Its remaining needs are met by the planktonic organisms caught by the tentacles of the polyps.

== Status ==
This coral has a wide range but is rare throughout its range. It is particularly susceptible to attack by the crown of thorns starfish. The main threats faced by corals in general are related to climate change and the mechanical destruction of their coral reef habitats; increasing damage from extreme weather events, rising sea water temperatures and ocean acidification. The International Union for Conservation of Nature has assessed the conservation status of this species as being "Least concern". All corals receive protection by being listed on CITES Appendix II.
