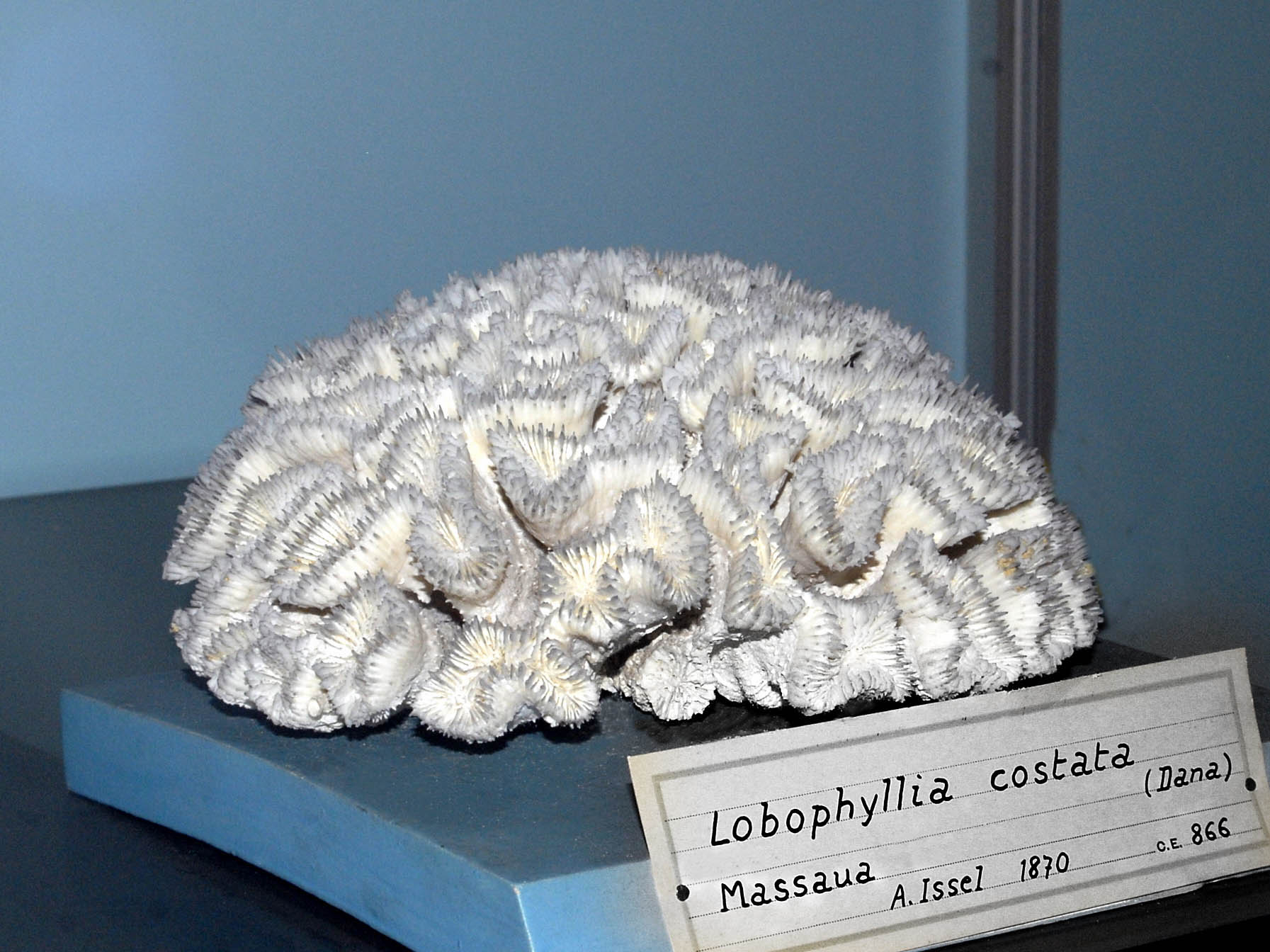
- Lobophyllia costata. Museum specimen

Conservation status
- Data Deficient (IUCN 3.1)

Scientific classification
- Kingdom: Animalia
- Phylum: Cnidaria
- Subphylum: Anthozoa
- Class: Hexacorallia
- Order: Scleractinia
- Family: Lobophylliidae
- Genus: Lobophyllia
- Species: L. costata

Binomial name
- Lobophyllia costata (Dana, 1846)

Synonyms
- Mussa costata Dana, 1846

= Lobophyllia costata =

Species of coral

Lobophyllia costata, common name lobed cactus coral, is a species of large polyp stony coral in the family Lobophylliidae.

== Distribution ==
This species is present in the Indo-Pacific.

== Habitat ==
These tropical reef-associated corals can be found in the upper reef slopes and in the lagoonsat a depth of 3–25 m.
