= Madrepora aspera =

Madrepora aspera is an unaccepted scientific name and may refer to two species of corals:

- Acropora aspera as described by Dana, 1846
- Echinophyllia aspera as described by Ellis & Solander, 1786
