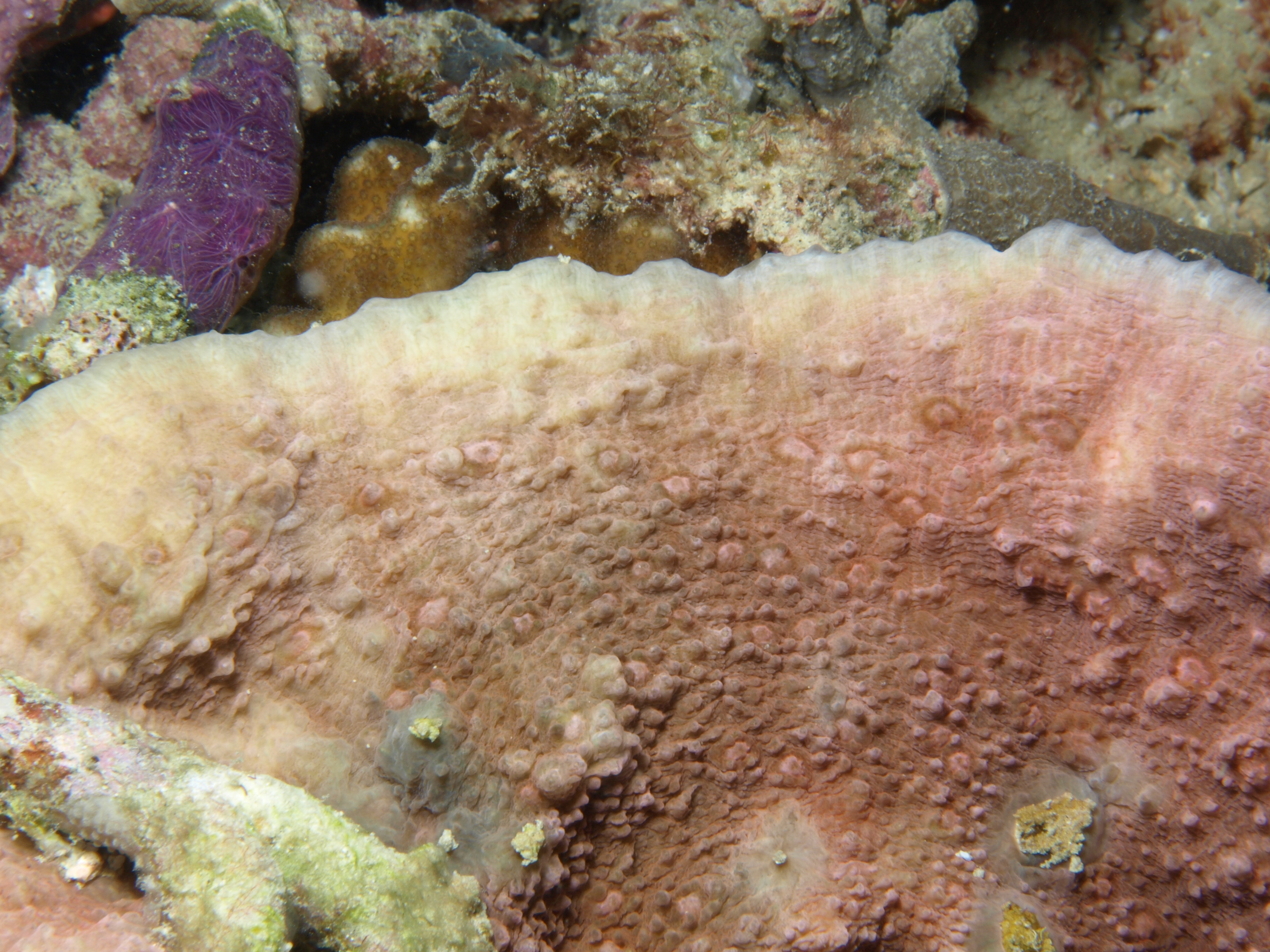
- Oxypora glabra

Scientific classification
- Domain: Eukaryota
- Kingdom: Animalia
- Phylum: Cnidaria
- Subphylum: Anthozoa
- Class: Hexacorallia
- Order: Scleractinia
- Family: Lobophylliidae
- Genus: Oxypora; Saville-Kent, 1871

Species
- See text

Synonyms
- Trachypora Verrill, 1864

= Oxypora =

Genus of corals

Oxypora is a genus of large polyp stony corals. Members of this genus are colonial corals and are generally foliaceous.

They usually have very thin leaves. Majority are native to the Indo-Pacific and are sometimes found in reef aquariums.

== Genera ==
The World Register of Marine Species lists the following species:

- Oxypora convoluta Veron, 2000
- Oxypora crassispinosa Nemenzo, 1979
- Oxypora egyptensis Veron, 2000
- Oxypora glabra Nemenzo, 1959
- Oxypora lacera (Verrill, 1864)
