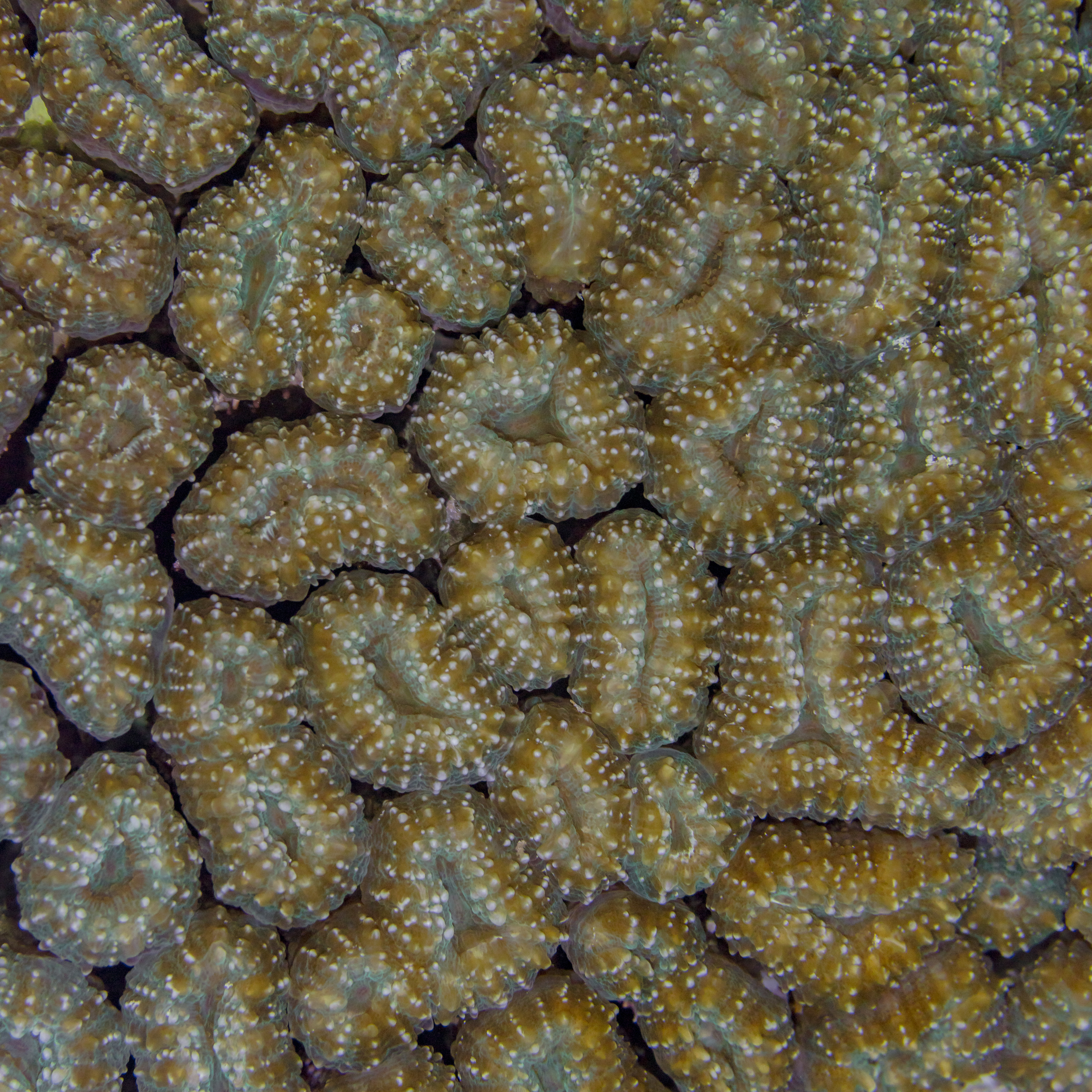
- Lobophyllia corymbosa

Conservation status
- Vulnerable (IUCN 3.1)

Scientific classification
- Kingdom: Animalia
- Phylum: Cnidaria
- Subphylum: Anthozoa
- Class: Hexacorallia
- Order: Scleractinia
- Family: Lobophylliidae
- Genus: Lobophyllia
- Species: L. corymbosa

Binomial name
- Lobophyllia corymbosa (Forskål), 1775)

Synonyms
- List: Lobophyllia eydouxi Milne Edwards & Haime, 1849; Lobophyllia fistulosa Milne Edwards & Haime, 1849; Lobophyllia ringens Milne Edwards & Haime, 1849; Lobophyllia rudis Milne Edwards & Haime, 1849; Madrepora corymbosa Forskål, 1775; Mussa cactus Dana, 1846; Mussa corymbosa (Forskål, 1775); Mussa eydouxi (Milne Edwards & Haime, 1849); Mussa fistulosa (Milne Edwards & Haime, 1849); Mussa glomerata (Milne Edwards & Haime, 1849); Mussa ringens (Milne Edwards & Haime, 1849); Mussa rudis (Milne Edwards & Haime, 1849)

= Lobophyllia corymbosa =

Species of coral

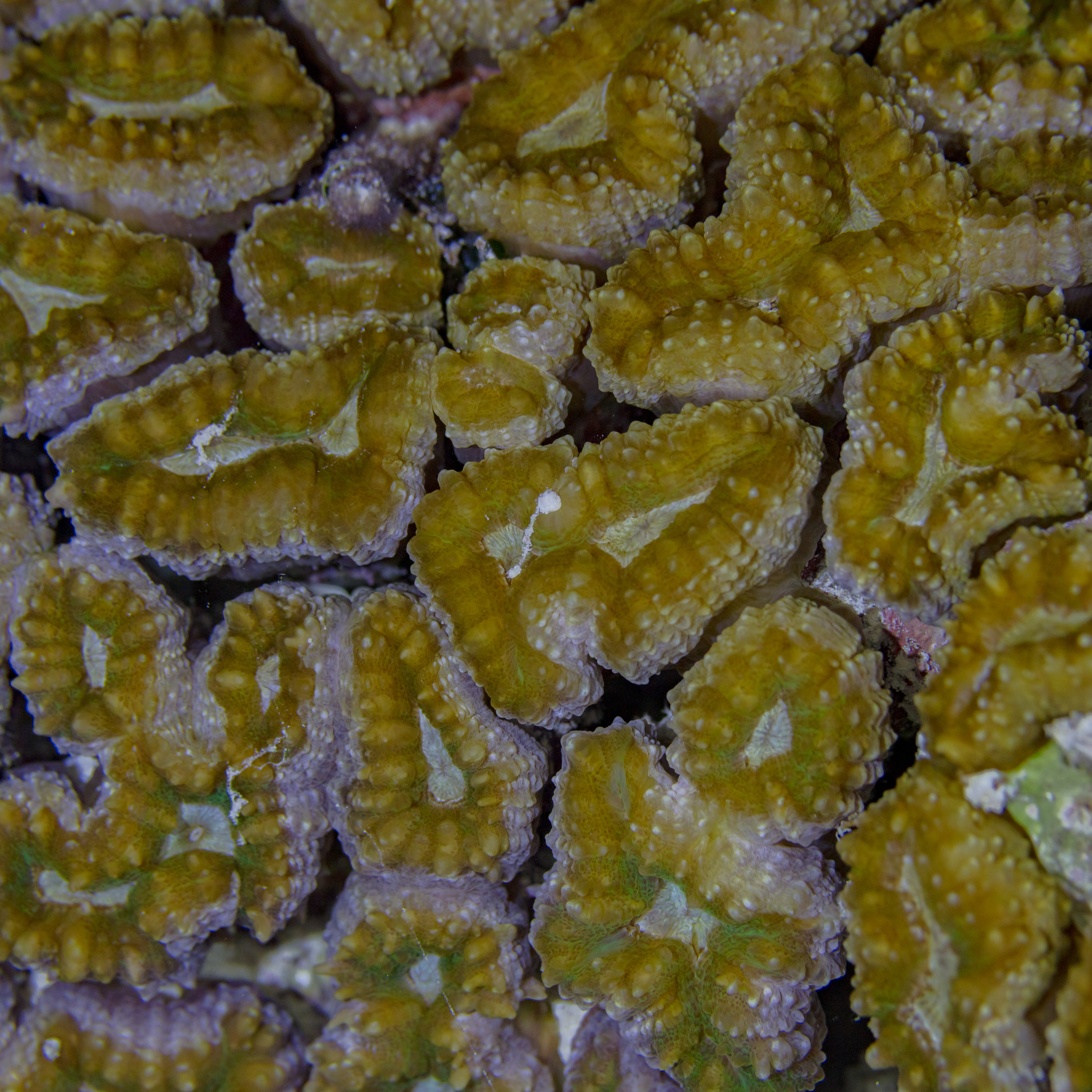
Colony in the Red Sea

Lobophyllia corymbosa, also known as lobed cactus coral or brain root coral, is a species of large polyp stony coral in the family Lobophylliidae. It occurs on reefs in shallow waters in the Red Sea, off the coast of East Africa, and in other parts of the tropical Indo-Pacific.

== Description ==
Lobophyllia corymbosa is a coral that either forms flat sheets or hemispherical domes. Though usually under 50 cm (20 in) in diameter this coral is sometimes several times that size. In the Red Sea, particularly large specimens are found. The individual lobes of the coral are united at their bases and are 15 to 30 cm (6 to 12 in) long and 5 to 10 cm (2 to 4 in) wide. The polyps are large and each one secretes a corallite or stony cup around itself. These are irregular in shape and form the skeleton of the coral. There is a distinct wall between the corallites, each one of which has numerous radiating vertical ridges known as septa. These septa are narrow within the corallite but thicker and longer on the walls. Their blunt teeth give the coral a prickly appearance. The corallites tend to be the shape of an hourglass and the polyps inside are thick and fleshy. They are normally retracted in the daytime but extend their tentacles at night to feed. The colour of the polyps is bluish or greenish-grey, or yellowish-brown. This colour is due to the zooxanthellae, the minute symbiotic dinoflagellates which reside within the tissues of the coral. These photosynthetic algae use sunlight to create organic compounds and the coral is able to use these as part of its nutritional needs.

== Distribution ==
The type locality of Lobophyllia corymbosa is the Red Sea. It is also found in the tropical Indian Ocean and the central and eastern Pacific Ocean at depths down to about 40 metres (130 ft). Its western range includes Mozambique, Madagascar, the Seychelles, Réunion, Mauritius, Aldabra and Chagos. It also occurs further east in Australia, Indonesia, Japan and the East China Sea. It is found on upper reef slopes and is common in some localities, but less so than the closely related Lobophyllia hemprichii.

== Biology ==
When young, Lobophyllia corymbosa is a colonial coral with a layer of living tissue covering the skeleton and connecting the polyps. As the coral grows, this layer disintegrates, and the individual polyps, although clones of one another, live independent lives on the coral skeleton in close proximity but unconnected by living tissue. It has been found that healthy polyps are prepared to transfer nutrients to injured neighbouring polyps that they recognize as clonemates. However, when corals were grafted so that neighbouring polyps were not clones of each other, no such transfer took place. This experiment showed that the polyps were not only able to recognise clones (even when they had been experimentally separated from them for years) but were also prepared to "help" them when they needed assistance. It is not clear if the transport of nutrients between the polyps is made by the transfer of blobs of mucus or whether it depends on the active movement of migratory cells.

== Status ==
There are no specific threats facing this coral and it has a wide range so the IUCN Red List of Threatened Species lists it as being of "Least Concern". It is, however, subject to the reef degradation that threatens all corals, although it seems to be more resilient than many other species. It is collected for use in reef aquaria and in 2005, Indonesia, the chief exporter, had a quota of 12,800 live pieces.
