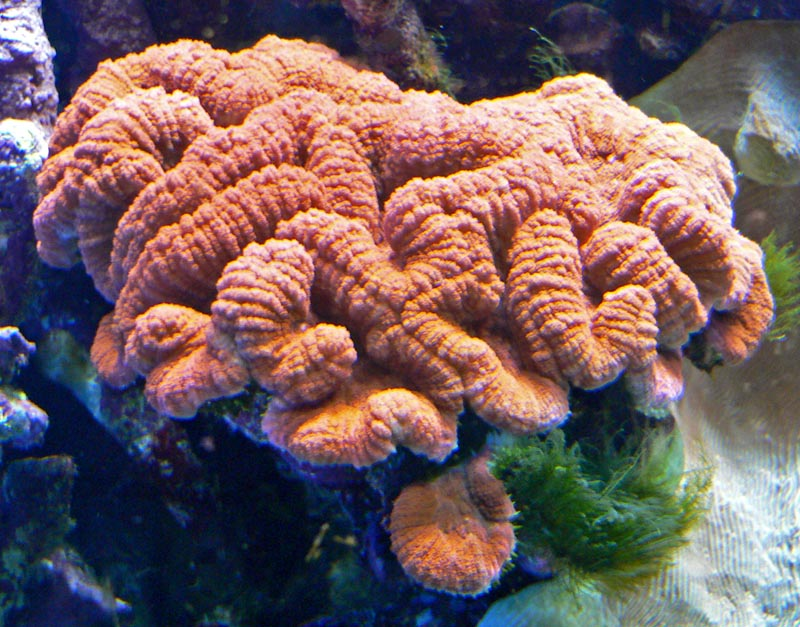
- Lobophyllia hemprichii

Scientific classification
- Domain: Eukaryota
- Kingdom: Animalia
- Phylum: Cnidaria
- Subphylum: Anthozoa
- Class: Hexacorallia
- Order: Scleractinia
- Family: Lobophylliidae
- Genus: Lobophyllia; Blainville, 1830

Species
- See text

Synonyms
- List: Australomussa Veron, 1985; Lobophyllia (Palauphyllia) Yabe, Sugiyama & Eguchi, 1936; Mussa (Symphyllia) Milne Edwards & Haime, 1848; Palauphyllia Yabe, Sugiyama & Eguchi, 1936; Parascolymia Wells, 1964; Symphyllia Milne Edwards & Haime, 1848

= Lobophyllia =

Genus of corals

Lobophyllia, commonly called lobed brain coral or lobo coral, is a genus of large polyp stony corals. Members of this genus are sometimes found in reef aquariums.

== Species ==
This genus includes the following species:

- Lobophyllia agaricia (Milne Edwards & Haime, 1849)
- Lobophyllia corymbosa (Forskal, 1775)
- Lobophyllia costata (Dana, 1846)
- Lobophyllia dentata Veron, 2000
- Lobophyllia diminuta Veron, 1985
- Lobophyllia erythraea (Klunzinger, 1879)
- Lobophyllia flabelliformis Veron, 2002
- Lobophyllia grandis Latypov, 2006
- Lobophyllia hassi (Pillai & Scheer, 1976)
- Lobophyllia hataii Yabe, Sugiyama & Eguchi, 1936
- Lobophyllia hemprichii (Ehrenberg, 1834)
- Lobophyllia ishigakiensis (Veron, 1990)
- Lobophyllia radians (Milne Edwards & Haime, 1849)
- Lobophyllia recta (Dana, 1846)
- Lobophyllia robusta Yabe, Sugiyama & Eguchi, 1936
- Lobophyllia rowleyensis (Veron, 1985)
- Lobophyllia serrata Veron, 2002
- Lobophyllia sinuosa (Quoy & Gaimard, 1833)
- Lobophyllia valenciennesii (Milne Edwards & Haime, 1849)
- Lobophyllia vitiensis (Brüggemann, 1877)
