= Micromussa =

Scientific classification
- Kingdom: Animalia
- Phylum: Cnidaria
- Subphylum: Anthozoa
- Class: Hexacorallia
- Order: Scleractinia
- Family: Lobophylliidae
- Genus: Micromussa; Veron, 2000

Species
- See text

Genus of corals

Micromussa is a genus of stony corals in the family Lobophylliidae.

== Species ==
The World Register of Marine Species currently lists the following species:

- Micromussa amakusensis (Veron, 1990)
- Micromussa indiana Benzoni & Arrigoni, 2016
- Micromussa lordhowensis (Veron & Pichon, 1982)
- Micromussa multipunctata (Hodgson, 1985)
- Micromussa pacifica Benzoni & Arrigoni, 2016
- Micromussa regularis (Veron, 2000)
