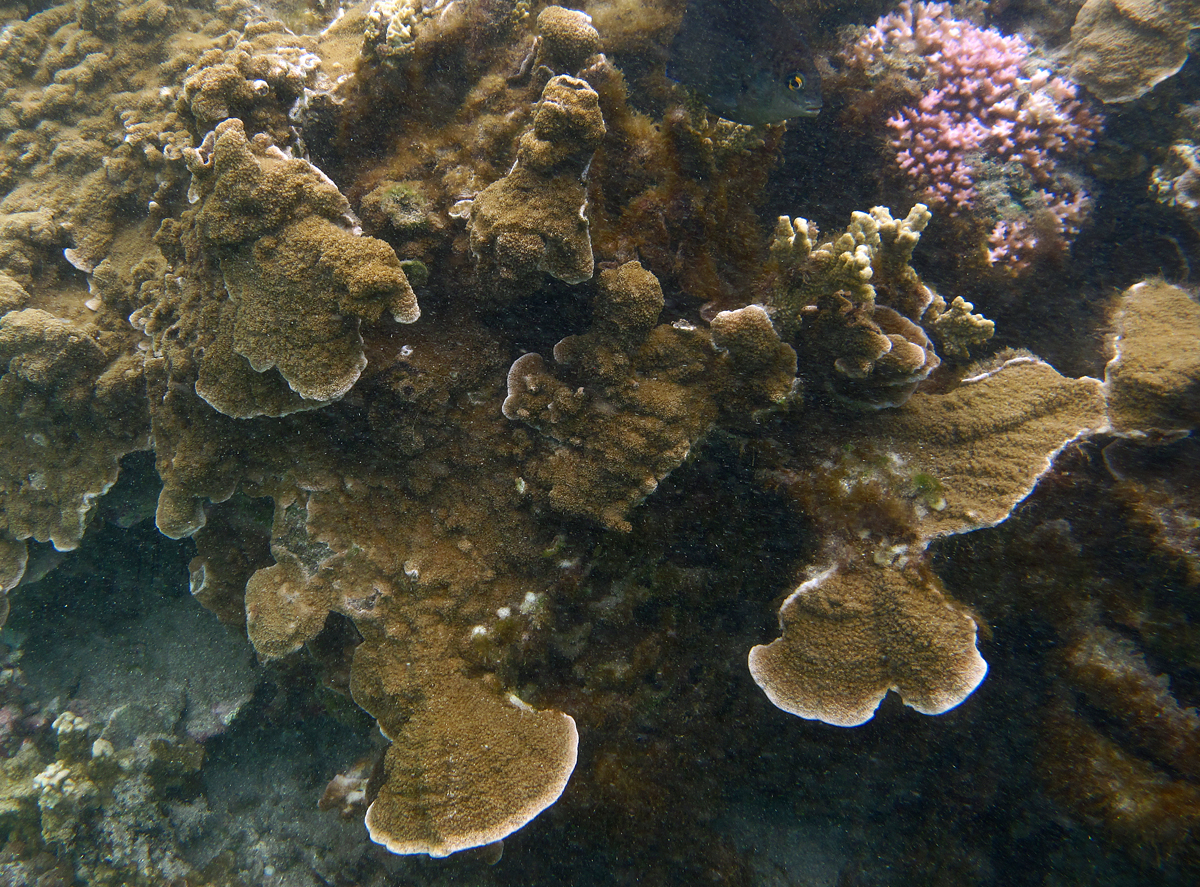

Conservation status
- Least Concern (IUCN 3.1)

Scientific classification
- Kingdom: Animalia
- Phylum: Cnidaria
- Subphylum: Anthozoa
- Class: Hexacorallia
- Order: Scleractinia
- Family: Lobophylliidae
- Genus: Echinophyllia
- Species: E. aspera

Binomial name
- Echinophyllia aspera (Ellis & Solander, 1786)

Synonyms
- List: Echinophyllia subglabra Nemenzo, 1979; Echinopora aspera (Ellis & Solander, 1786); Madrepora aspera Ellis & Solander, 1786; Oxyphyllia aspera (Ellis & Solander, 1786); Oxypora aspera (Ellis & Solander, 1768)

= Echinophyllia aspera =

Species of coral

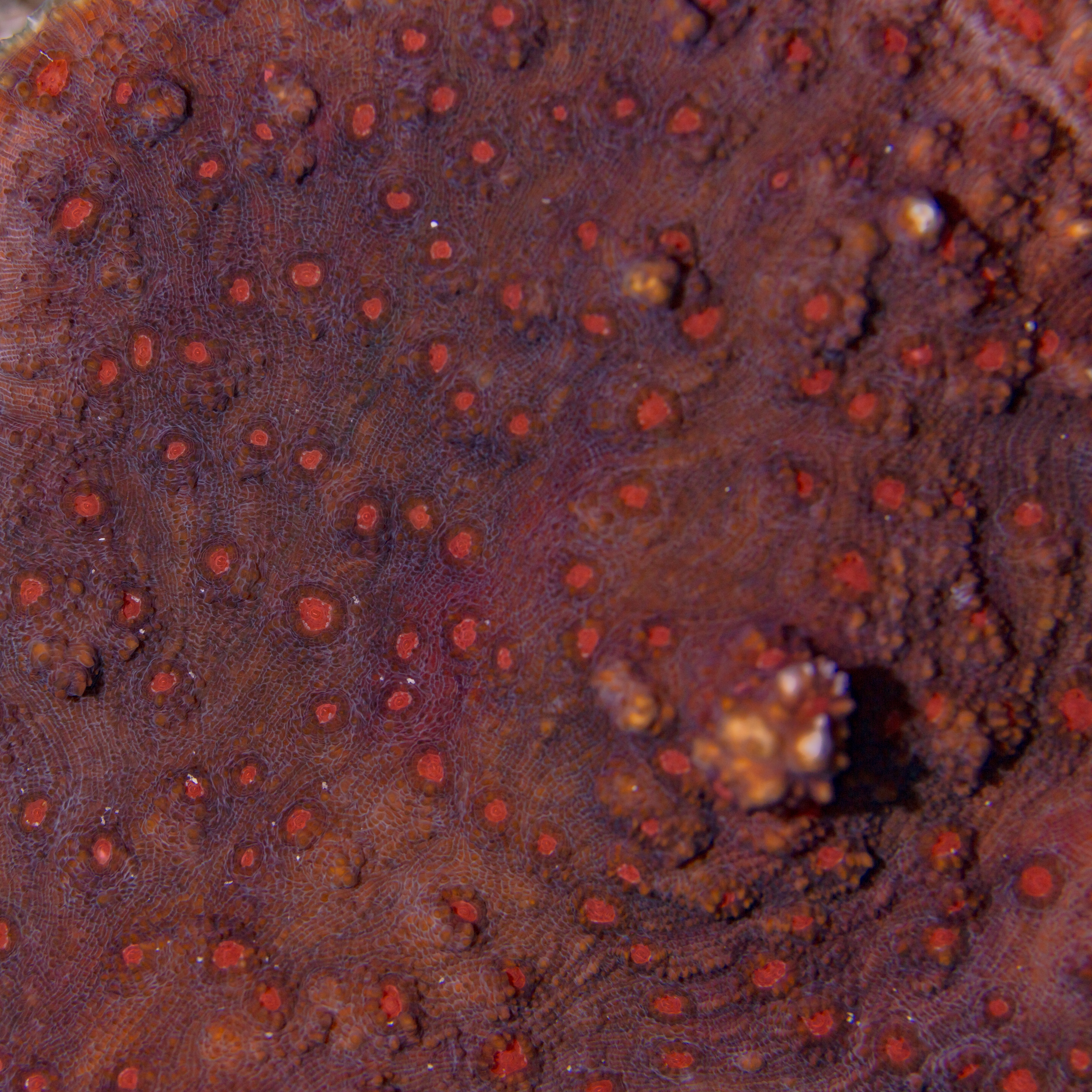
Detailed view

Echinophyllia aspera, commonly known as the Chalice coral, is a species of large polyp stony corals in the family Lobophylliidae. It is a colonial coral which is partly encrusting and partly forms laminate plates or tiers. It is native to the western and central Indo-Pacific.

== Description ==
Colonies of E. aspera are quite diverse in form and may be up to 60 cm (2 ft) across. Some are encrusting but others are hummocky or have thickened sections, with plates, whorls or tiers which tend to lie parallel to the underlying surface. The corallites (stony cups in which the polyps sit) are usually level with the surface but may be protuberant in some colonies. They are normally only on the upper surface of leaves and plates. Small colonies may have a large central corallite and a number of widely spaced peripheral ones, with septo-costae (stony ridges) radiating from the central one. As the colony grows, the distinction between the main and peripheral corallites is lost. The septo-costae are spiny on the upper surfaces but the costae on the lower surfaces are smooth. This coral is usually some shade of brown, green or red, sometimes with the oral discs of the polyps being a contrasting colour. This coral is easily confused with Oxypora lacera underwater.

== Distribution and habitat ==
E. aspera is native to the western and central Indo-Pacific region. Its range extends from the Red Sea and Madagascar to Japan, Australia and many Pacific island groups. Although some colonies are found near the crests of reefs in shallow water, it is more common at middle depths of between 10 and 30 m (30 and 100 ft) where it is generally found in sheltered fore reef habitats where it has a preference for shaded locations.

== Status ==
Corals are principally threatened by habitat loss due to the destruction of reefs and by global warming. However, E. aspera is likely to be more resilient than some other species because it is widespread and common, and occurs at mid-depths. The International Union for Conservation of Nature has therefore rated its conservation status as being of "least concern".
