= Homophyllia =

Scientific classification
- Kingdom: Animalia
- Phylum: Cnidaria
- Subphylum: Anthozoa
- Class: Hexacorallia
- Order: Scleractinia
- Family: Lobophylliidae
- Genus: Homophyllia; Brüggemann, 1877

Species
- See text

Genus of corals

Homophyllia is a genus of stony corals in the family Lobophylliidae.

== Species ==
The World Register of Marine Species currently lists the following species:

- Homophyllia australis (Milne Edwards & Haime, 1848)
- Homophyllia bowerbanki (Milne Edwards, 1857)
