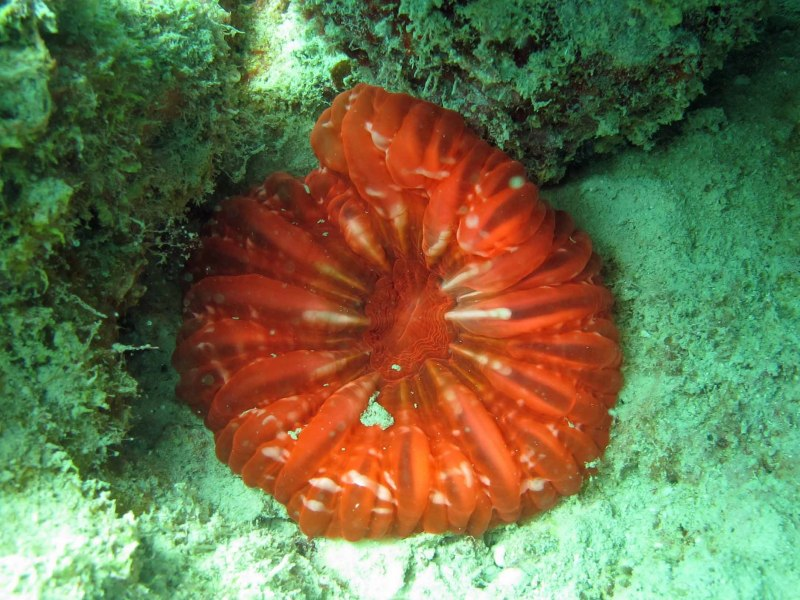
- Cynarina lacrymalis off Lizard island, Australia

Scientific classification
- Kingdom: Animalia
- Phylum: Cnidaria
- Subphylum: Anthozoa
- Class: Hexacorallia
- Order: Scleractinia
- Family: Lobophylliidae
- Genus: Cynarina; Brüggemann, 1877

Species
- See text

Synonyms
- Acanthophyllia Wells, 1937; Mussa (Lithophyllia) Milne Edwards, 1857; Protolobophyllia Yabe & Sugiyama, 1935; Rhodocyathus Bourne, 1905

= Cynarina =

Genus of corals

Cynarina is a genus of stony corals in the family Lobophylliidae.

== Species ==
The World Register of Marine Species currently lists the following species:

- Cynarina lacrymalis (Milne Edwards & Haime, 1848)
- Cynarina macassarensis (Best & Hoeksema, 1987)
