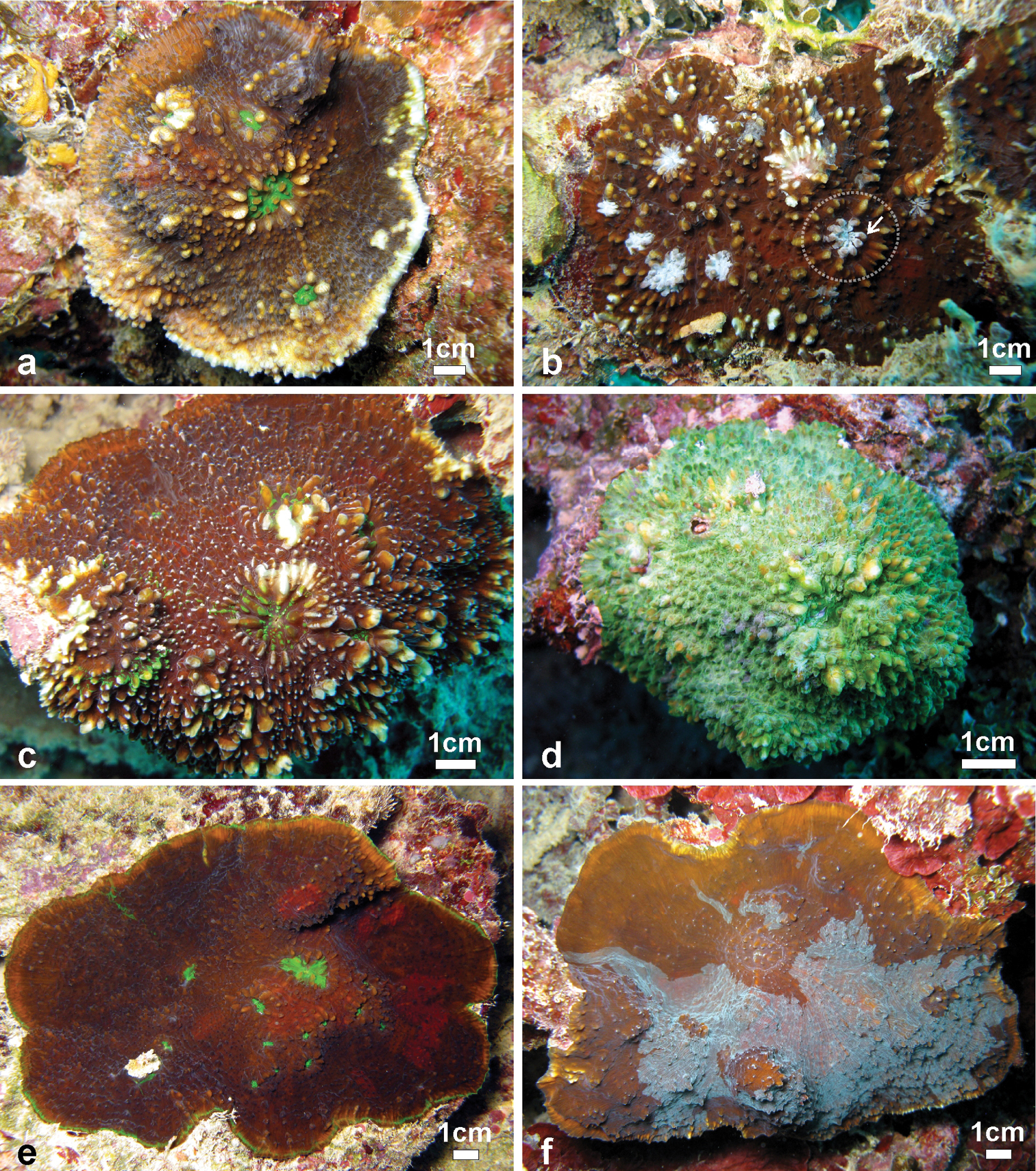
- Echinophyllia tarae

Scientific classification
- Domain: Eukaryota
- Kingdom: Animalia
- Phylum: Cnidaria
- Class: Hexacorallia
- Order: Scleractinia
- Family: Lobophylliidae
- Genus: Echinophyllia; Klunzinger, 1879

Species
- See text

Synonyms
- Oxyphyllia Yabe & Eguchi, 1935

= Echinophyllia =

Genus of corals

Echinophyllia is a genus of large polyp stony corals. Members of this genus are colonial corals and are generally foliaceous, usually with very thin leaves. They are native to the Indo-Pacific and are sometimes found in reef aquariums.

== Genera ==
The World Register of Marine Species lists the following species:

- Echinophyllia aspera (Ellis & Solander, 1786)
- Echinophyllia bulbosa Arrigoni, Benzoni & Berumen, 2016
- Echinophyllia costata Fenner & Veron, 2000
- Echinophyllia echinata (Saville-Kent, 1871)
- Echinophyllia echinoporoides Veron & Pichon, 1980
- Echinophyllia galli Benzoni & Arrigoni, 2016
- Echinophyllia hirsuta Nemenzo, 1979
- Echinophyllia orpheensis Veron & Pichon, 1980
- Echinophyllia patula (Hodgson & Ross, 1982)
- Echinophyllia pectinata Veron, 2000
- †Echinophyllia sassellensis Budd & Bosellini, 2016
- Echinophyllia tarae Benzoni, 2013
