= Moseleya (cnidarian) =

Scientific classification
- Domain: Eukaryota
- Kingdom: Animalia
- Phylum: Cnidaria
- Subphylum: Anthozoa
- Class: Hexacorallia
- Order: Scleractinia
- Family: Faviidae
- Genus: Moseleya; Quelch, 1884

Genus of corals

Moseleya is a genus of cnidarians belonging to the family Lobophylliidae.

The species of this genus are found in Australia.

== Species ==
Species:

- Moseleya latistellata Quelch, 1884
- Moseleya minor Ma, 1959
