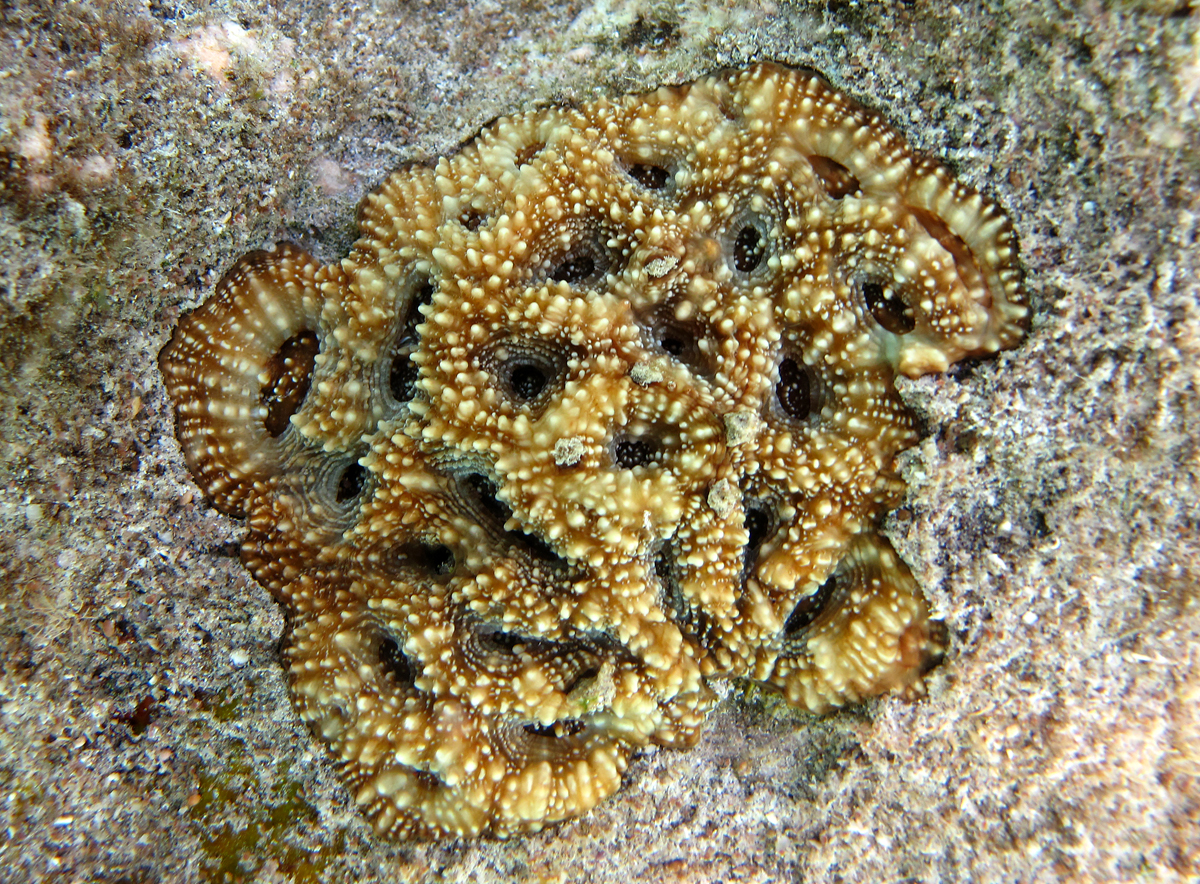
- Acanthastrea echinata at Réunion

Scientific classification
- Domain: Eukaryota
- Kingdom: Animalia
- Phylum: Cnidaria
- Class: Hexacorallia
- Order: Scleractinia
- Family: Lobophylliidae
- Genus: Acanthastrea; Milne Edwards & Haime, 1848

Species
- See text

Synonyms
- Acanthastraea Milne Edwards & Haime, 1848 [lapsus]

= Acanthastrea =

Genus of corals

Acanthastrea is a genus of large polyp stony corals in the family Lobophylliidae. The colonies are massive and usually flat. The corallites are either circular or angular in shape. The septa are thick near the wall of the corallite, becoming thin near the columella, and have tall teeth. The polyps are extended only at night.

The genus contains the following species:

- Acanthastrea brevis Milne Edwards & Haime, 1849
- Acanthastrea echinata (Dana, 1846)
- Acanthastrea hemprichii (Ehrenberg, 1834)
- Acanthastrea minuta Moll & Best, 1984
- Acanthastrea pachysepta (Chevalier, 1975)
- Acanthastrea polygonalis† Martin, 1880
- Acanthastrea rotundoflora Chevalier, 1975
- Acanthastrea subechinata Veron, 2002
