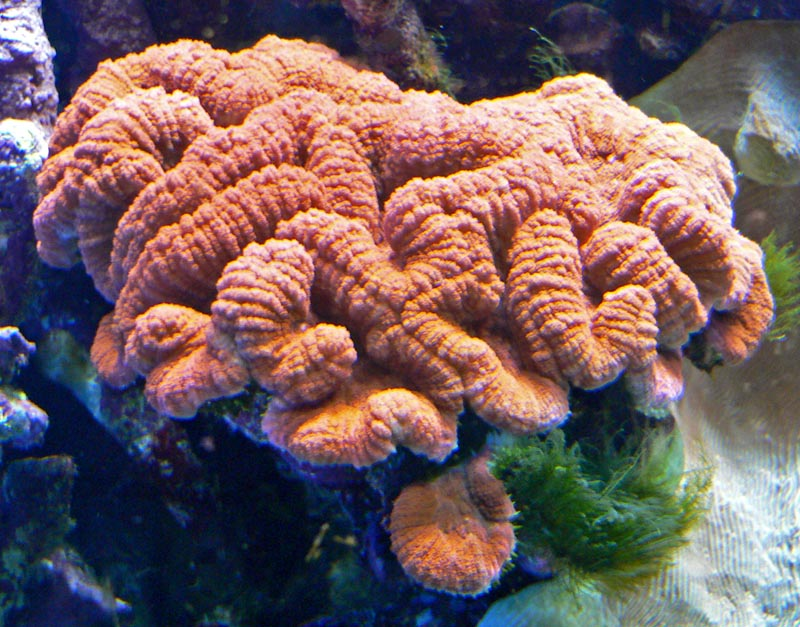
- Lobophyllia hemprichii

Scientific classification
- Kingdom: Animalia
- Phylum: Cnidaria
- Subphylum: Anthozoa
- Class: Hexacorallia
- Order: Scleractinia
- Family: Lobophylliidae; Dai & Horng, 2009

Genera
- See text

Synonyms
- Lobophylliidae Fukami, Budd & Knowlton, 2012

= Lobophylliidae =

Family of corals

Lobophylliidae is a family of large polyp stony corals. The family was created in 2009 after a revision of the "robust" families of Faviidae, Merulinidae, Mussidae and Pectiniidae, which had been shown to be polyphyletic. The family Lobophylliidae was formed out of the Indo-Pacific species that had traditionally been included in Mussidae, and some of the species which had previously formed Pectiniidae, the remaining species from Pectiniidae having been merged into Merulinidae. The type genus is Lobophyllia.

== Taxonomy ==
The "robust" stony coral families of Faviidae, Merulinidae, Mussidae and Pectiniidae, have traditionally been recognised on morphological grounds but recent molecular analysis has shown that these families are polyphyletic, the similarities between the species having occurred through convergent evolution. Additionally, some traditional genera such as Favia and Scolymia have been found to be polyphyletic, with the Atlantic faviids and scolymids being more closely related to each other than they are to their Indo-Pacific relatives. A revised classification, proposed in 2012, places the Pacific species of Mussidae in a new family, Lobophylliidae and retains the taxon Mussidae for the Atlantic species. In the revision, the genera Echinomorpha, Echinophyllia and Oxypora were transferred to Lobophylliidae from Pectiniidae and the genus Moseleya from elsewhere.

== Genera ==
The World Register of Marine Species includes the following genera in the family:

- Acanthastrea Milne Edwards & Haime, 1848
- Acanthophyllia Wells, 1937
- Australophyllia Benzoni & Arrigoni, 2016
- Cynarina Brüggemann, 1877
- Echinomorpha Veron, 2000
- Echinophyllia Klunzinger, 1879
- Homophyllia Brüggemann, 1877
- Lobophyllia de Blainville, 1830
- Micromussa Veron, 2000
- Moseleya Quelch, 1884
- Oxypora Saville-Kent, 1871
- Paraechinophyllia Arrigoni, Benzoni & Stolarski, 2019
- Sclerophyllia Klunzinger, 1879
