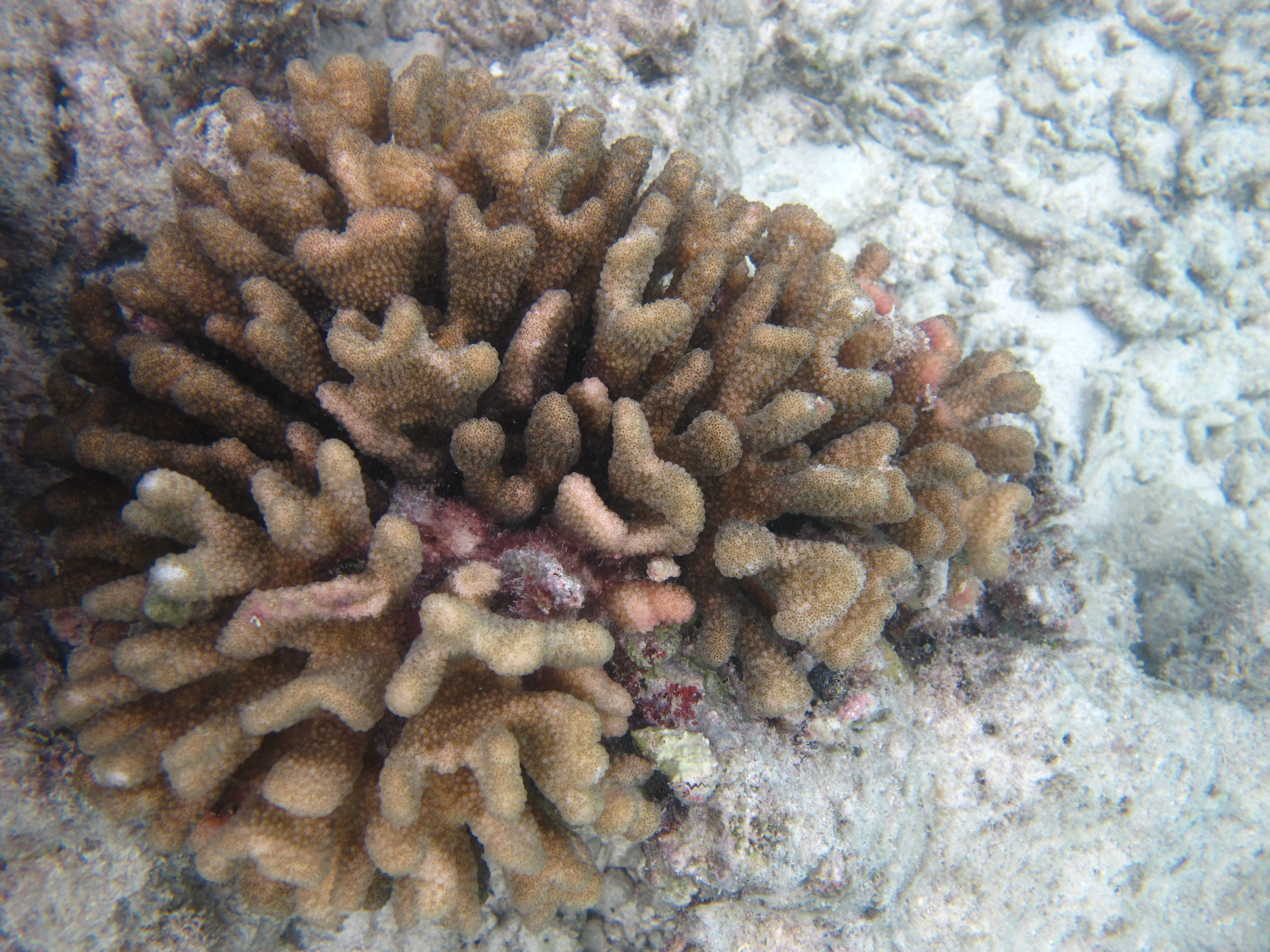

Conservation status
- Endangered (IUCN 3.1)

Scientific classification
- Kingdom: Animalia
- Phylum: Cnidaria
- Subphylum: Anthozoa
- Class: Hexacorallia
- Order: Scleractinia
- Family: Pocilloporidae
- Genus: Pocillopora
- Species: P. elegans

Binomial name
- Pocillopora elegans Dana, 1846

= Pocillopora elegans =

Species of coral

Pocillopora elegans is a species of colonial stony coral in the family Pocilloporidae. It is native to tropical and subtropical parts of the western, central and eastern Pacific Ocean. It is susceptible to bleaching and various coral diseases and the International Union for Conservation of Nature (IUCN) has listed it as an endangered species.

== Description ==
P. elegans forms small clumps of short, thick, mostly erect branches with flattened tips. The surface of the coral has smooth rounded lobes known as verrucae (lumpy skeletal outgrowths that include several corallites) which give this genus of corals their characteristic appearance. The corallites are flat and very small and scattered over the surface of the skeleton. This coral varies in colour, often being some shade of cream, pink or greenish-brown. Similar species are Pocillopora verrucosa, which has rougher verrucae, Pocillopora grandis and Pocillopora capitata.

== Distribution and habitat ==
P. elegans is native to the tropical Pacific Ocean. Its range extends from peninsular Malaysia and Sumatra through the Central Pacific to Mexico, Central America, the Galapagos Islands and Colombia. It is found in shallow reef environments at depths down to about 20 m (66 ft).

== Status ==
P. elegans has a wide range and is common over much of its range, but it is particularly susceptible to bleaching, coral diseases and predation by the crown-of-thorns starfish. Before the 1982–1983 El Niño–Southern Oscillation (ENSO) event, it was, along with Pocillopora damicornis, one of the strongest and most vigorous species of reef-building corals in the eastern Pacific, but after the event, it had disappeared from many of its previous locations, although there has since been some recruitment in Costa Rica, Panama and the Galapagos Islands. In general, the reefs where it lives are under threat, and the International Union for Conservation of Nature (IUCN) has assessed its conservation status as being endangered.
