= Puerto Ángel =

- Town
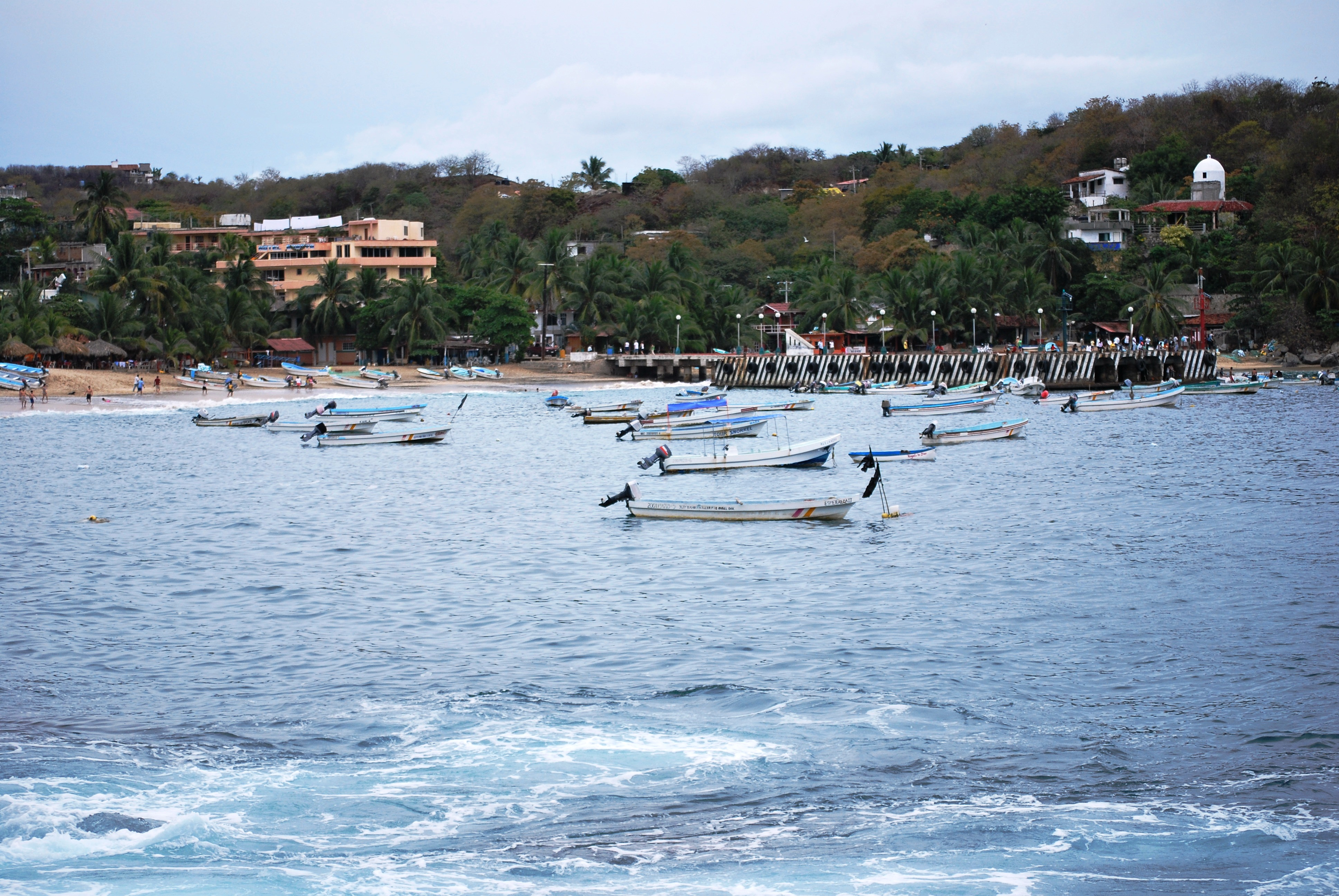
- View of the wharf at Puerto Ángel

- Location in Mexico
- Coordinates: 15°40′00″N 96°29′26″W
- Country: Mexico
- State: Oaxaca
- Municipality: San Pedro Pochutla
- Elevation: 20 m (66 ft)

Population (2005)
  - Total: 2,440
- Time zone: UTC-6 (CST)
- Postal code: 70902
- Area code: 958

Puerto Ángel (English: "Angel Port") is a Mexican port and town in the state of Oaxaca located in the municipality of San Pedro Pochutla. It, along with San Agustinillo and Playa Zipolite are known as the "Riviera Oaxaqueña". It is located 9 km south of city of Pochutla approximately 50 kilometers west of Huatulco and 80 kilometers east of Puerto Escondido. Despite tourism development since the 1960s, the town is still mostly a fishing village, located on a small bay surrounded by rocky hills that lead into the Sierra Madre del Sur. It was founded in the mid-19th century as a port for the region's coffee and lumber industries but since then other means of shipping these products has replaced it.

== History ==
The community was founded in the 1850s when, through the efforts of Benito Juárez, the government built a wharf. At that time, this was a very isolated part of the country and the port was designed to help the area develop its coffee and lumber industries, by giving it a means to ship these products to other parts of the country. The port reached its height by 1870, when it was the busiest port in the state of Oaxaca. However, after this time several developments lead to the port's decline. A rail connection and road connected Salina Cruz to the capital and it emerged as a port. Also, federal sponsorship of the wharf at Puerto Ángel faded after Juárez's death.

In the 1960s, tourists began to take interest in this part of Oaxaca's coastline. Highway 175, which has been only a dirt trail, was paved. Highway 200, which links most of Mexico's Pacific coast towns was built in the 1970s and 1980s, connecting Puerto Ángel with more popular beach destinations to the north. Gradually, small hotels were built to accommodate tourists, who come from inside the country due to the lack of amenities such as hot water, air conditioning, or other modern conveniences that most Western tourists desire.

Hurricane Pauline made landfall at Puerto Ángel on 8 October 1997. Damage to this town and many other coastal areas of Oaxaca was extensive.

The pier that was initially built in the 19th century was refurbished in 1999; however, it is too high to accommodate the fishing boats that use the harbor.

In 2009, an unusually large number of pelicans migrated to the area due to colder than normal temperatures farther north. Many of these pelicans were accidentally drowned by fishermen's nets or run over by boats as they tried to get to the trapped fish. The fishermen asked for help from the government to figure out what to do to avoid these pelican deaths, as most claim to have affinity for the birds and many even have a pelican as a family pet.

== The town ==
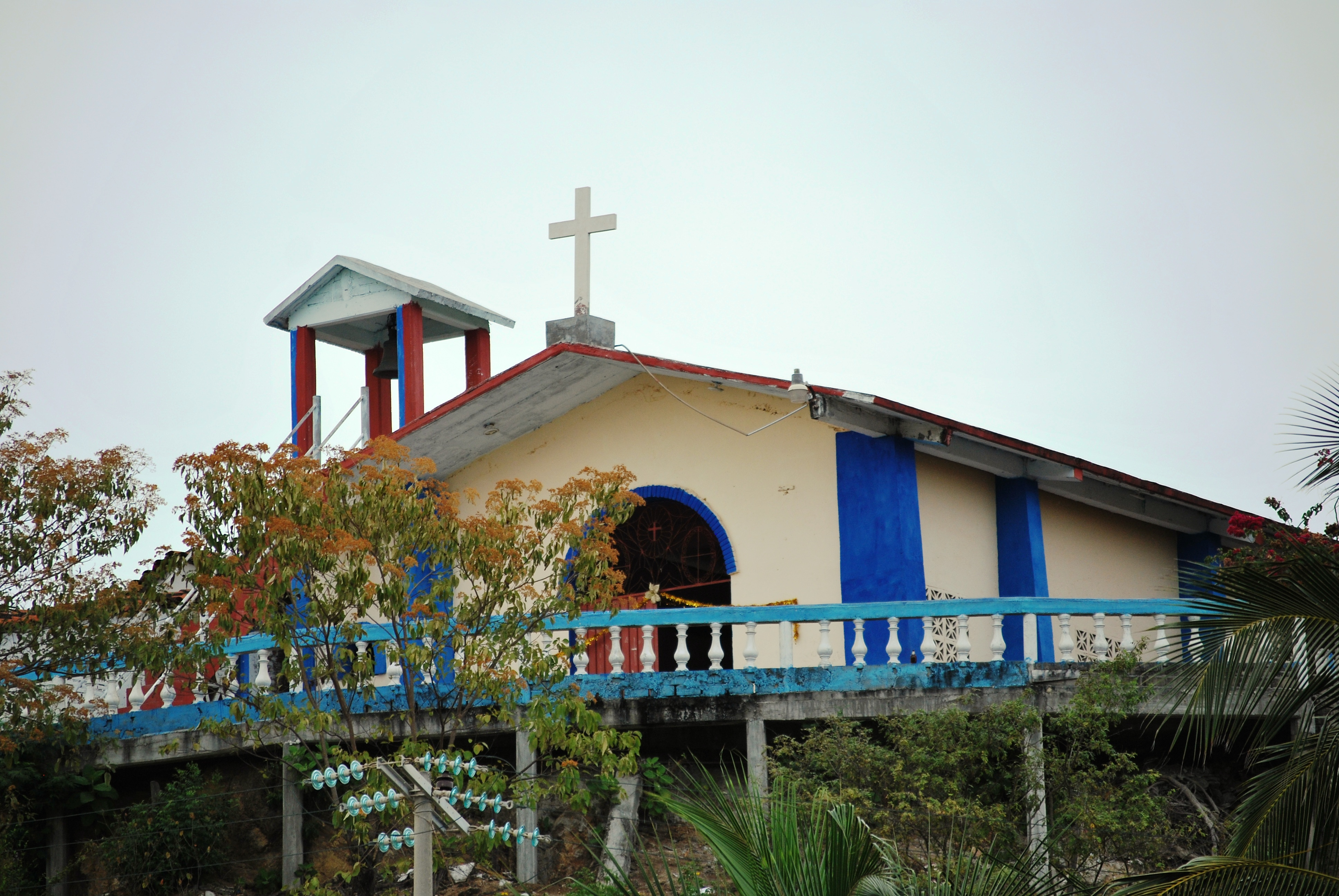
Puerto Ángel church

The community of Puerto Ángel sits on a small horseshoe shaped bay. From where ocean meets land, there is only a couple of hundred meters of flat land before the terrain steeply rises into rocky hills that lead to the Sierra Madre del Sur. Much of this flat land is dedicated to the main road, which runs parallel to the main beach or Playa Principal. On the east side of the bay is the town wharf, but most fishing boats are run directly onto the beach itself. Fruit laden papaya trees and bougainvillea are abundant on the hillsides; palm trees populate the beach. The climate is generally warm and moist. In winter, the temperatures are cooler, but the vegetation is relatively brown due to the dry season. The summers are hot and muggy, with afternoon or evening rains and abundant green foliage.

Climate data for Puerto Ángel (1981–2000)
| Month | Jan | Feb | Mar | Apr | May | Jun | Jul | Aug | Sep | Oct | Nov | Dec | Year |
|---|---|---|---|---|---|---|---|---|---|---|---|---|---|
| Record high °C (°F) | 34.7 (94.5) | 34.8 (94.6) | 36.7 (98.1) | 36.3 (97.3) | 37.2 (99.0) | 36.7 (98.1) | 35.9 (96.6) | 37.5 (99.5) | 36.9 (98.4) | 37.7 (99.9) | 38.3 (100.9) | 36.0 (96.8) | 38.3 (100.9) |
| Mean daily maximum °C (°F) | 31.6 (88.9) | 31.5 (88.7) | 31.6 (88.9) | 32.2 (90.0) | 32.7 (90.9) | 32.0 (89.6) | 32.3 (90.1) | 32.7 (90.9) | 32.0 (89.6) | 32.7 (90.9) | 33.0 (91.4) | 32.0 (89.6) | 32.2 (90.0) |
| Daily mean °C (°F) | 26.3 (79.3) | 26.5 (79.7) | 27.0 (80.6) | 27.7 (81.9) | 28.4 (83.1) | 28.0 (82.4) | 27.8 (82.0) | 28.1 (82.6) | 27.7 (81.9) | 27.8 (82.0) | 27.6 (81.7) | 26.6 (79.9) | 27.5 (81.5) |
| Mean daily minimum °C (°F) | 21.0 (69.8) | 21.5 (70.7) | 22.4 (72.3) | 23.1 (73.6) | 24.1 (75.4) | 24.0 (75.2) | 23.4 (74.1) | 23.5 (74.3) | 23.4 (74.1) | 23.0 (73.4) | 22.2 (72.0) | 21.3 (70.3) | 22.7 (72.9) |
| Record low °C (°F) | 16.3 (61.3) | 14.8 (58.6) | 9.6 (49.3) | 11.6 (52.9) | 12.8 (55.0) | 18.0 (64.4) | 16.5 (61.7) | 18.0 (64.4) | 14.6 (58.3) | 18.0 (64.4) | 12.9 (55.2) | 16.2 (61.2) | 9.6 (49.3) |
| Average precipitation mm (inches) | 8.9 (0.35) | 2.7 (0.11) | 0.2 (0.01) | 1.0 (0.04) | 38.0 (1.50) | 215.1 (8.47) | 173.0 (6.81) | 186.0 (7.32) | 200.5 (7.89) | 162.0 (6.38) | 21.4 (0.84) | 16.4 (0.65) | 1,025.4 (40.37) |
| Average precipitation days (≥ 0.1 mm) | 0.8 | 0.7 | 0.2 | 0.3 | 3.4 | 12.4 | 8.9 | 10.9 | 11.7 | 6.2 | 1.4 | 0.9 | 57.9 |
| Average relative humidity (%) | 72 | 69 | 67 | 74 | 73 | 76 | 77 | 77 | 79 | 76 | 74 | 73 | 74 |
| Mean monthly sunshine hours | 198 | 168 | 221 | 224 | 276 | 229 | 261 | 268 | 227 | 223 | 204 | 239 | 2,739 |
Source: Servicio Meteorológico Nacional

Fishing is still the economic base of Puerto Ángel, with local tourism coming second. Tourists come from the city of Oaxaca, neighboring states such as Veracruz, or from further north, driving down from the city of Mexico, and are usually from working class or lower middle class families. The town sees very few Western tourists due to the ageing nature of hotels which are lacking in modern conveniences. For example, the town has no hot water, suffers frequent power cuts and intermittent WiFi. Hygiene standards sometimes lack in local food establishments. Also as detailed below, as a fishing town, the smell of rotting fish lingers in the air which to Western tourists may be unappealing. As a result of the lack of outside tourists the town retains a rustic, ragged charm and continues to be steeped in local culture. While the main road, Boulevard Vigilio Uribe is fully paved, many others are not and encountering wandering farm animals is not uncommon. The town's center is marked by a small plaza adjoining a pier at the intersection of Vigilio Uribe and Vasconcelos. The smell of rotting fish innards and the processing of fish is distinct. There is a small naval installation located on the west side of the bay. Puerto Ángel is several times larger than the nearby ocean communities of Mazunte or Zipolite and has a steady stream of traffic on its streets. The town has essential services such as police doctor, pharmacies, Internet and basic markets. Banking is best done in the nearby city of Pochutla.

Like other parts of the "Riviera Oaxaqueña", Puerto Ángel is popular with Mexican tourists looking for a relaxing atmosphere. The town fills during Easter Week, a popular time for vacationing in Mexico. There is limited nightlife and no loud discos. Accommodations here are very basic without hot showers, rooms are worn with time, however, as mosquitoes are active here, especially at night, most places provide mosquito netting. Hotels in the main part of town are not on the beach itself due to its commercial nature but rather on the hillsides. A number of beachside hotels exist at Playa Panteón.

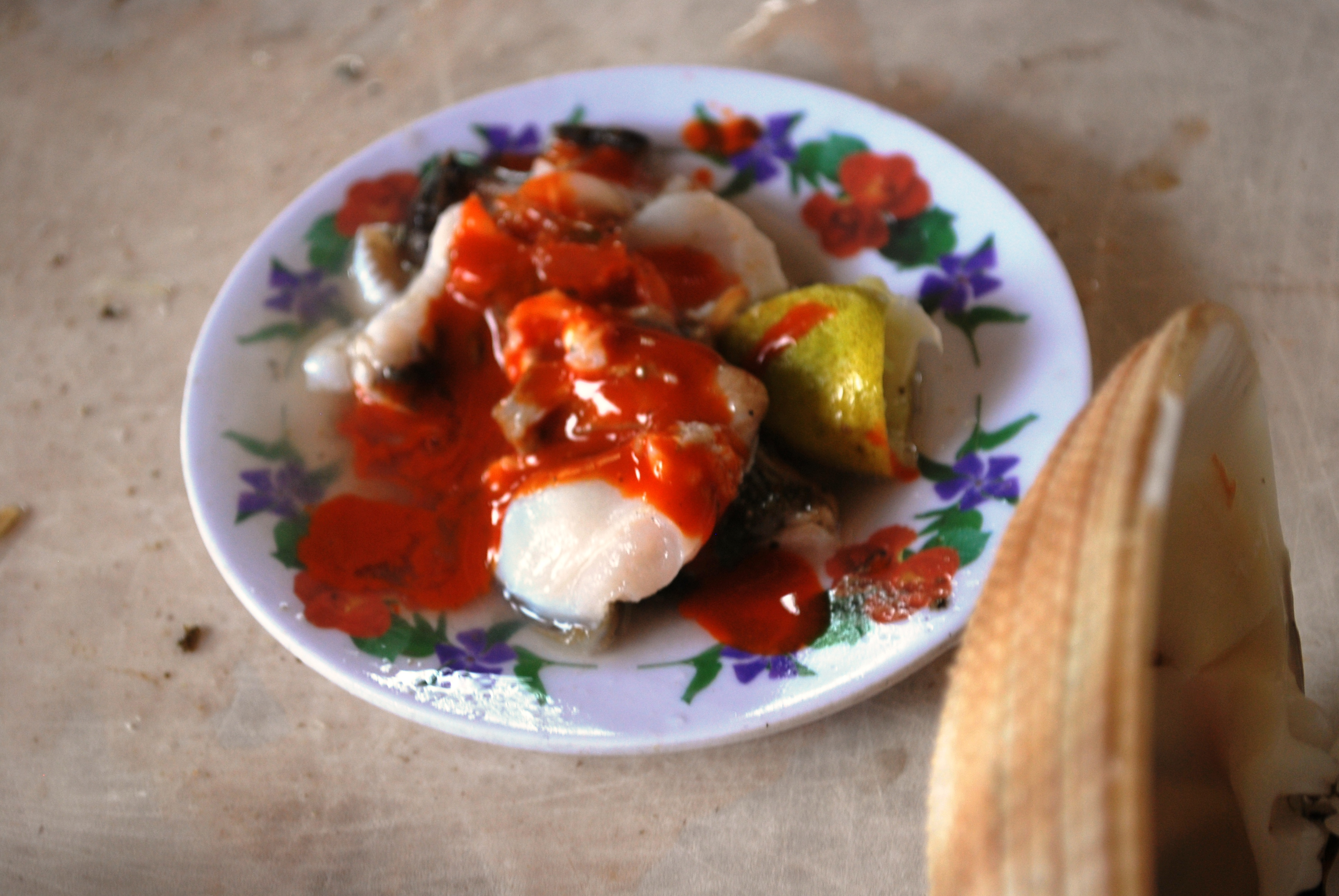
Raw clam prepared with lime juice, salt and hot sauce

Most places to eat in the town are impromptu food stands and pricy beachside restaurants serving seafood and pasta. Chicken and meat dishes are available but most specialties focus on seafood. Fresh fish, especially tuna, is served here, served as a salad stuffed into an avocado or batter-fried tuna and fish prepared Veracruz style with a sauce of tomatoes, olives and onions. Other seafood available includes ocean perch, swordfish, shark, lobster, octopus and oysters, which are commonly served fried.

Boats are available for hire for deep sea fishing or to tour the isolated beaches located just east of the bay. Most of these outfits rent equipment for fishing and snorkeling.

Each year in October, the port holds the festival called "Santos Angeles Custodios" (Holy Guardian Angels). The event begins with a festive church service and includes cultural events. The highlights are the crowning of the queen and princess of the festival and the parade of boats that have been decorated for the occasion. Each boat takes off from the pier decorated and filled with passengers who ride for free as it makes a circle around the bay. The boats are judged for creativity and originality. Other festivals held here include Navy Day on 1 June, Fisherman's Day on 5 August, Day of the Dead in the local cemetery, and Culture Week during the second week of December.

== Education ==
A campus of the Universidad del Mar is located in Puerto Ángel.

== Transportation ==
The Puerto Ángel region is separated from the rest of Oaxaca and Mexico by the Sierra Madre del Sur. The only highway from here to Oaxaca City, Highway 175 is extremely winding. The distance is only about 240 km but the trip takes between six and seven hours. Almost all bus transportation from other parts of Mexico stop in Pochutla, where it is necessary to transfer to other means to get to Puerto Ángel. It is possible to fly into Puerto Escondido or Huatulco from Mexico City or Oaxaca City then travel by road to Puerto Ángel.

In 2008, President Felipe Calderón announced the Oaxaca city- Coast Highway Project to link the state capital to Puerto Escondido and Huatulco with more modern highways. With the new highways, it is predicted that the trip to coast towns like Puerto Ángel will decrease from seven or eight hours to about two or three hours. The project began in 2008 and was scheduled to be completed in 2010.

The construction of the new highway has been slower than projected due to various factors, such as lawsuits by local residents demanding compensation for their land. Also economic slowdowns post 2008 played a role. Nevertheless, the work was active as of 2014. Current completion date is sometime in 2015.

The new superhighway (supercarretera) generally follows the route of the current Highway 175 from Oaxaca until Barranca Larga (near Ejutla de Crespo). From there, it cuts a new route to Ventanillas, Oaxaca on the coast (about 13 km east of Puerto Escondido, Oaxaca), where it meets the old coastal highway 200.

Public transportation between the coastal towns is usually in the form of pick up trucks that have been outfitted to carry passengers but these tend to travel only as far as Zipolite and not Puerto Ángel. To get to the other coastal towns it is necessary to take a taxi, which can be done collectively with other passengers. Between Puerto Ángel and the city of Pochutla, there collective taxis and pickup truck "buses". All forms of transportation pass along the main road of town.

== Beaches and waters ==
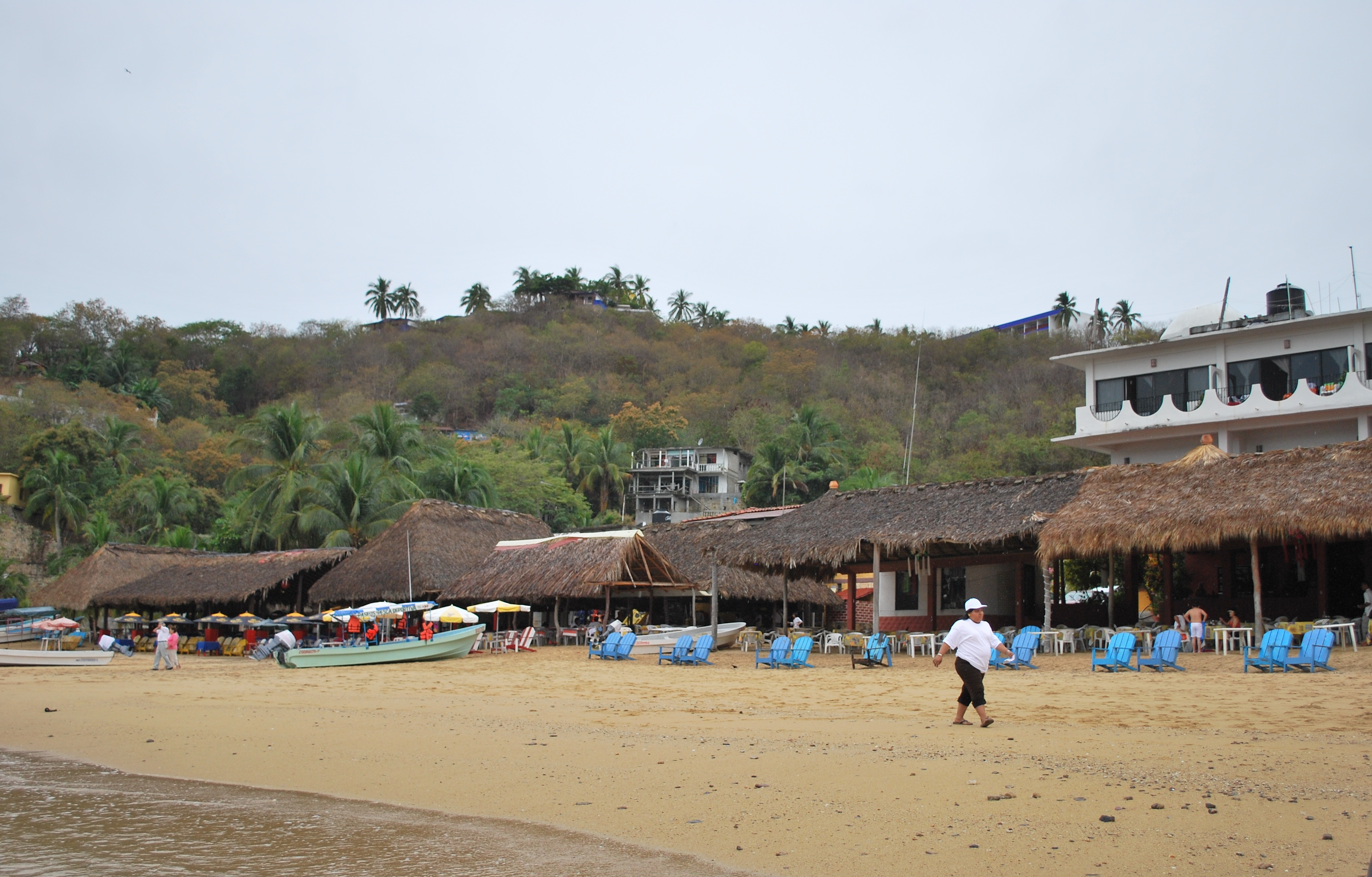
Playa Panteón

The town of Puerto Ángel sits on a small horseshoe bay whose entrance is protected by craggy outcropping of rock. This protects the two beaches within the bay from strong ocean currents, which are common on other beaches along this coast, and make this area safe for swimming. The waters here are clear with various shades of green and blue. There is a wide diversity of marine flora and fauna including three of Mexico's seven species of marine turtles, the hawksbill turtle, prieta turtle and olive ridley turtle. The harbor is filled with fishing boats, with fishermen working onshore to mend their bright yellow and red fishing nets. Large gray herons dive into the shallow waters searching for fish, while white egrets and seagulls perch on the rocks above the surf.

Playa Principal (Main Beach) and Playa Panteón (Cemetery Beach) cover most of the edge of the Puerto Ángel Bay. Playa Principal (also known as Playa del Muelle) is not recommended for swimming near the wharf which has a lot of fishing boat traffic. This wharf is busiest in the mornings when fishing boats arrive with their catches. Tuna is the most common fish but also red snapper, shark, bonito, sailfish, lobster, conch, octopus and other seafood is caught. Tuna and lobster is most plentiful during times when the water temperature is cooler. The pier is built to too high for fishing boats, but there is good fishing off the main pier, with many catching fish the size of speckled trout but the shape of tuna. It is also a popular meeting place at dusk and dawn.

Playa Principal is connected to the bay's other beach by a stone walkway that goes over the rocky cliff that divides the two. It is called the "andador". Waves crash on the boulders below the walkway and can spray seawater onto the path at high tide. After crossing the andador, one arrives to Playa Panteón, which translates to "Cemetery Beach". This beach is named for the community cemetery that lies just behind it. The sand is less fine, but it is a little more sheltered than Playa Principal and is popular for snorkeling around the rocks. This beach is lined with restaurants and lounge chairs and have lifeguards, which is not common in Mexico.

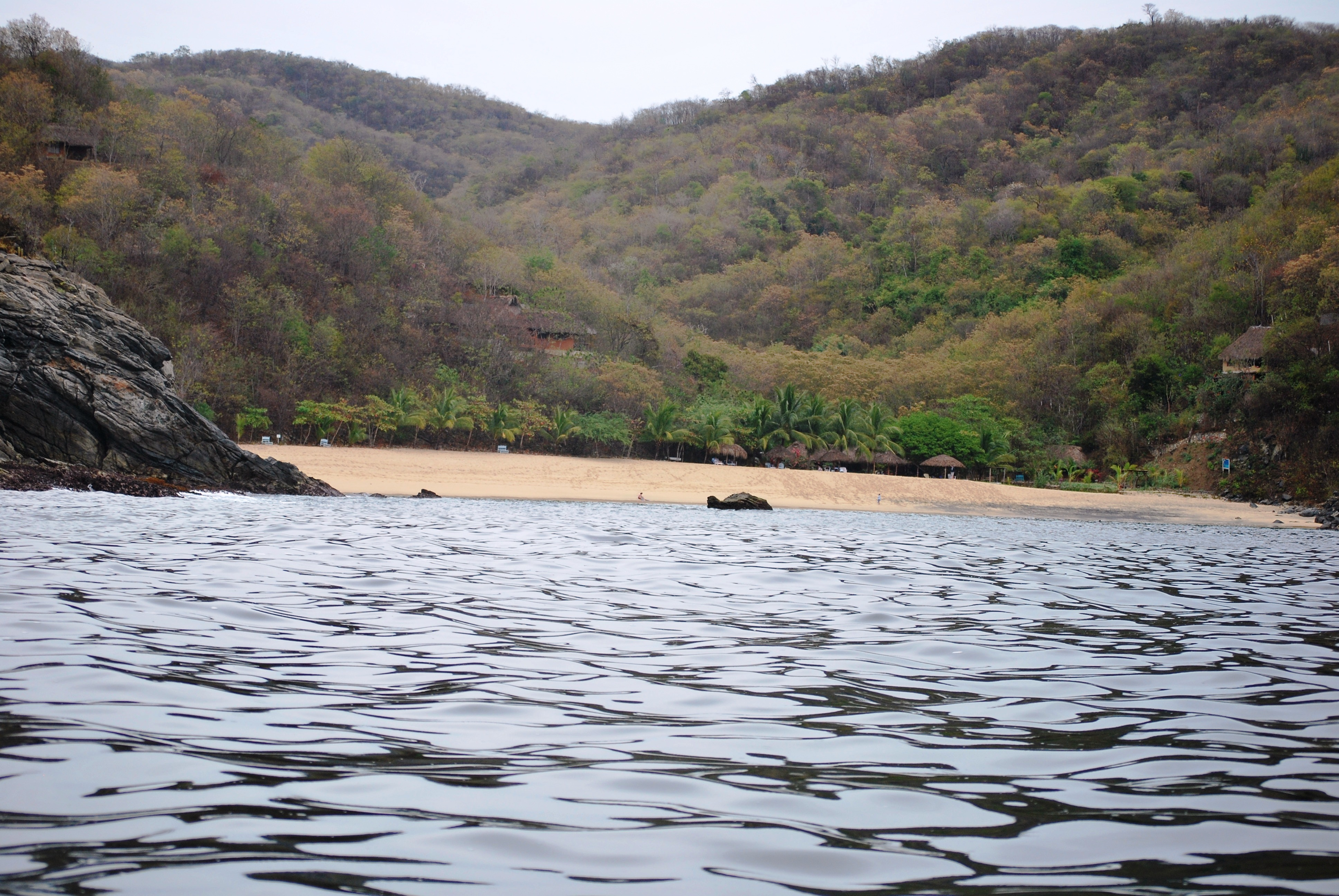
Playa Boquilla

In addition to the two beaches in the bay proper, there are a number of small isolated coves with beaches just to the east of Puerto Ángel. These include Playa Ixtacahuite, Playa La Mina, Playa La Boquilla and Playa La Tijera. Ixtacahuite Beach is best for scuba diving and recreational fishing because it is next to a coral reef. La Boquilla Beach is on a small shallow bay and is best for snorkeling. It can be reached by road with a rugged vehicle but is easier to arrive by boat from Puerto Ángel. There is a restaurant that's open during the high season seasons.

Off the coast of Puerto Ángel in open ocean is a large, well developed coral reef area. This reef occupies a small ocean plateau that is 15 to 20 meters below the surface and about fifty to one hundred meters from the closest land. One of the most commonly found species is the black coral (Pocillopora damicornis). Large corals are rare and mostly found at the bottom of the reefs. Six other species of coral were found including Pocillopora capitata, Pocillopora meandrina, Pocillopora verrucosa, Pavona gigantea, Porites panamensis and an undescribed species noted as Pocillopora sp. Colonies of Porites panamensis were extremely scarce, encrusting, and appeared only at depths of less than three meters. The agaricid Pavona gigantea was rare, but it developed some large colonies with over one meter of height, especially on rocky zones and at depths from three to five meters. The undescribed species has no branches but develops colonies with completely flat upper surfaces. The colonies are developed in layers with each physically separate from the rest. There is evidence off a massive die-off of coral and recolonization, but it is not known what caused the coral to die.

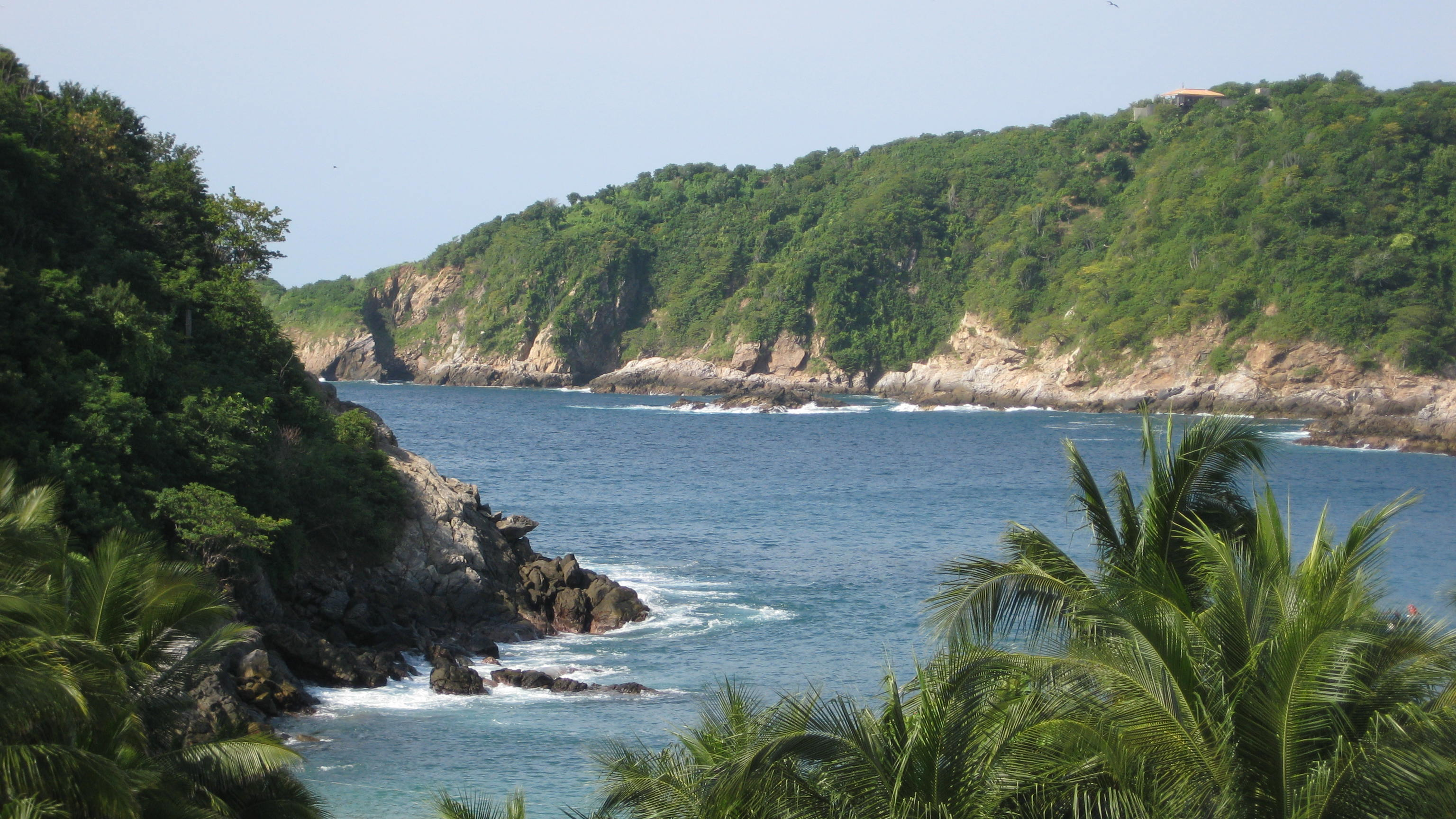
Puerto Ángel

== Nearby attractions ==
Near Puerto Ángel there are a number of other ocean side communities and other attractions. To the west are Zipolite, San Agustinillo, Mazunte and La Ventanilla. Zipolite is a popular tourist beach famous for allowing nudity. San Agustinillo is a small beach area divided into three sections and Mazunte is home to Centro Mexicano de la Tortuga (Mexican Turtle Center) . La Ventanilla has nearly virgin beaches facing open ocean but is best known for its lagoon in which visitors can see crocodiles, turtles and numerous birds in its mangroves. Slightly inland is the El Paraíso fresh water spring and the Los Reyes waterfalls at Chacalapa.
