= Pocillopora aliciae =

Conservation status
- Endangered (IUCN 3.1)

Scientific classification
- Kingdom: Animalia
- Phylum: Cnidaria
- Subphylum: Anthozoa
- Class: Hexacorallia
- Order: Scleractinia
- Family: Pocilloporidae
- Genus: Pocillopora
- Species: P. aliciae

Binomial name
- Pocillopora aliciae Schmidt-Roach, Miller & Andreakis, 2013

Species of coral

Pocillopora aliciae is an endangered species of stony coral in the family Pocilloporidae from eastern Australia.

It occurs on rocky reef areas exposed to strong wave action and on non-reef rock substrates from the Cook Island Aquatic Reserve in northern New South Wales to Sydney, New South Wales, as well as Norfolk Island.
