= Pocillopora acuta =

Conservation status
- Endangered (IUCN 3.1)

Scientific classification
- Kingdom: Animalia
- Phylum: Cnidaria
- Subphylum: Anthozoa
- Class: Hexacorallia
- Order: Scleractinia
- Family: Pocilloporidae
- Genus: Pocillopora
- Species: P. acuta

Binomial name
- Pocillopora acuta Lamarck, 1816

Species of coral

Pocillopora acuta is a species of stony coral in the family Pocilloporidae with strong ecological importance. It is a cauliflower-shaped coral widely distributed from the Central Pacific to the Indian Ocean.
