= Pocillopora fungiformis =

Conservation status
- Endangered (IUCN 3.1)

Scientific classification
- Kingdom: Animalia
- Phylum: Cnidaria
- Subphylum: Anthozoa
- Class: Hexacorallia
- Order: Scleractinia
- Family: Pocilloporidae
- Genus: Pocillopora
- Species: P. fungiformis

Binomial name
- Pocillopora fungiformis Veron, 2000

Species of coral

Pocillopora fungiformis is a species of colonial stony coral in the family Pocilloporidae. It is native to Madagascar. It is a mostly encrusting species and grows in patches up to 2 m (7 ft) across.

== Description ==
Colonies of P. fungiformis are generally encrusting, and can be 2 m (7 ft) across. larger colonies additionally have bifurcating upright or sloping branches which tend to have flattened ends, and which can grow to 20 cm (8 in) in length. Irregular verrucae (lumpy skeletal outgrowths) grow on the surface of the coral, and on branches growing at oblique angles, the verrucae are more abundant on the upper side. The individual corallites (stony cups in which the polyps sit) are small and crowded, each having one septum (stony ridge) more developed than the rest. This coral is some shade of greenish-brown.

== Distribution and habitat ==
P. fungiformis is endemic to Madagascar where it is found on the north end of the island and the south end. It prefers shallow reef habitats with strong water movement, to a maximum depth of 15 m (49 ft).

== Status ==
P. fungiformis has a small range and is an uncommon species. It is particularly susceptible to bleaching and coral diseases and the reefs where it lives are under threat. The International Union for Conservation of Nature has assessed its conservation status as being "endangered".
