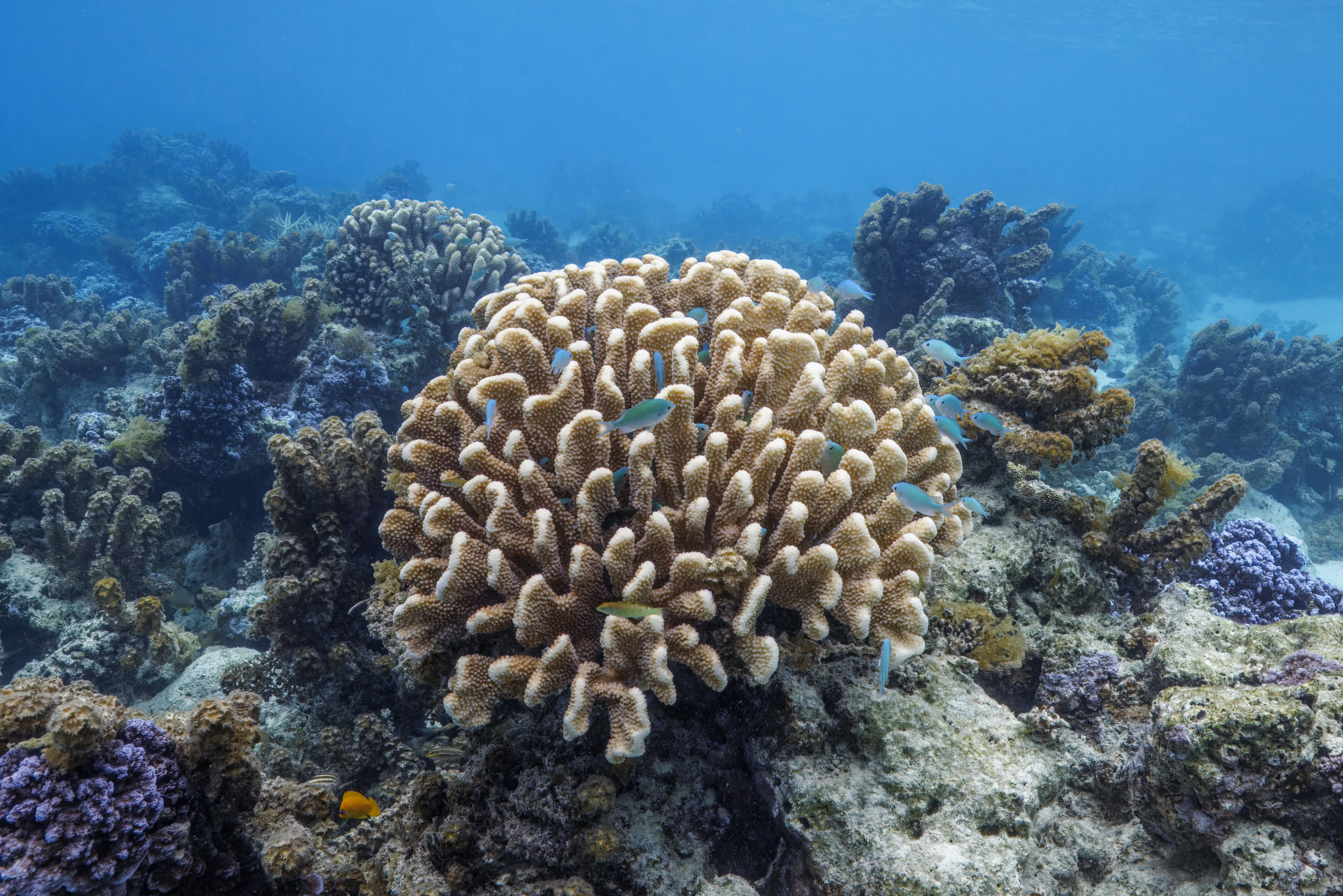
- With blue damselfish (Pomacentrus pavo); Moorea, French Polynesia

Conservation status
- Least Concern (IUCN 3.1)

Scientific classification
- Kingdom: Animalia
- Phylum: Cnidaria
- Subphylum: Anthozoa
- Class: Hexacorallia
- Order: Scleractinia
- Family: Pocilloporidae
- Genus: Pocillopora
- Species: P. grandis

Binomial name
- Pocillopora grandis Dana, 1846

Synonyms
- List: Pocillopora coronata Gardiner, 1897; Pocillopora elongata Dana, 1846; Pocillopora eydouxi Milne Edwards, 1860; Pocillopora rugosa Gardiner, 1897; Pocillopora symmetrica Thiel, 1932

= Pocillopora grandis =

Species of coral

Pocillopora grandis is a colonial species of stony coral in the family Pocilloporidae. It is known commonly as antler coral, and is found in the Indo-West Pacific to the Eastern Tropical Pacific.

== Distribution ==
This species is distributed in the Red Sea and the Gulf of Aden. Further distribution includes: the southwest and northeastern Indian Ocean, the central Indo-Pacific, tropical Australia, southern Japan and the South China Sea, the oceanic West Pacific, the central Pacific, the Hawaiian Islands and Johnston Atoll, the Far Eastern Pacific. In the Eastern Tropical Pacific region it is also found off the coasts of Mexico, Costa Rica, Panama, Colombia and Ecuador.
