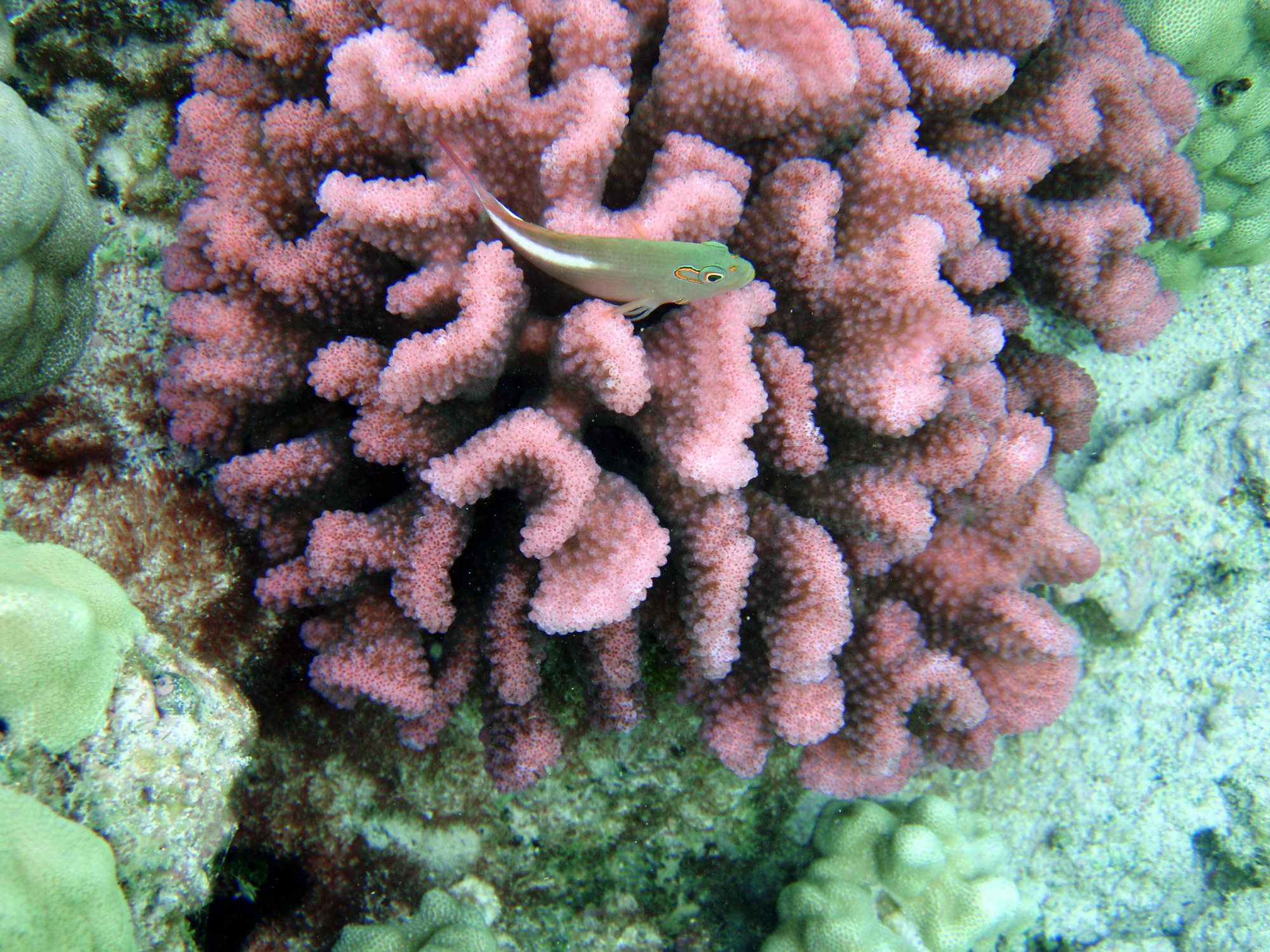
- Pocillopora meandrina with a resident fish

Scientific classification
- Kingdom: Animalia
- Phylum: Cnidaria
- Subphylum: Anthozoa
- Class: Hexacorallia
- Order: Scleractinia
- Family: Pocilloporidae
- Genus: Pocillopora; Lamarck, 1816

Species
- See text

= Pocillopora =

Genus of corals

Pocillopora is a genus of stony corals in the family Pocilloporidae occurring in the Pacific and Indian Oceans. They are commonly called cauliflower corals and brush corals.

== Description ==
Cauliflower corals are widespread and can be identified by the presence of wart-like growths on their surface. The colonies can be dome shaped or branching and are very variable in colour and shape depending on the species and the environmental conditions. Species situated on shallow reefs pounded by the sea tend to be stunted whilst those in deep calm water are often thin and open. Each individual polyp has tentacles but these are normally extended only at night.

== Biology ==
The polyps are hermaphrodite, possessing four sets of male and four sets of female gonads. Pocillopora can reproduce asexually via fragmentation. They also reproduce sexually and the larvae develop inside the polyps rather than free floating in the water, a reproduction strategy known as brooding. When they are mature, the larvae are released and can remain free-swimming for several weeks before settling on the substrate.

Pocillopora corals contain microscopic symbiotic algae (zooxanthellae) living within them. Through photosynthesis, these algae produce energy-rich molecules that the coral polyps can assimilate. In return, the coral provides the algae with protection and access to sunlight. The polyps also feed by capturing tiny particles using their tentacles. These corals are widespread because they sometimes attach to floating objects and can be carried far afield by currents and wind.

== Species ==
The World Register of Marine Species includes the following species in the genus:

- Pocillopora acuta Lamarck, 1816
- Pocillopora aliciae Schmidt-Roach, Miller & Andreakis, 2013
- Pocillopora ankeli Scheer & Pillai, 1974
- Pocillopora bairdi Schmidt-Roach, 2014
- Pocillopora brevicornis Lamarck, 1816
- Pocillopora capitata Verrill, 1864
- Pocillopora damicornis (Linnaeus, 1758)
- Pocillopora effusus Veron, 2002
- Pocillopora elegans Dana, 1846
- Pocillopora fungiformis Veron, 2002
- Pocillopora grandis Milne Edwards & Haime, 1860
- Pocillopora indiania Veron, 2002
- Pocillopora inflata Glynn, 1999
- Pocillopora kelleheri Veron, 2002
- Pocillopora ligulata Dana, 1846
- Pocillopora mauritiana Brüggemann, 1877
- Pocillopora meandrina Dana, 1846
- Pocillopora molokensis Vaughan, 1907
- Pocillopora verrucosa (Ellis and Solander, 1786)
- †Pocillopora vitiensis Hoffmeister, 1945
- Pocillopora woodjonesi Vaughan, 1918
- Pocillopora zelli Veron, 2002
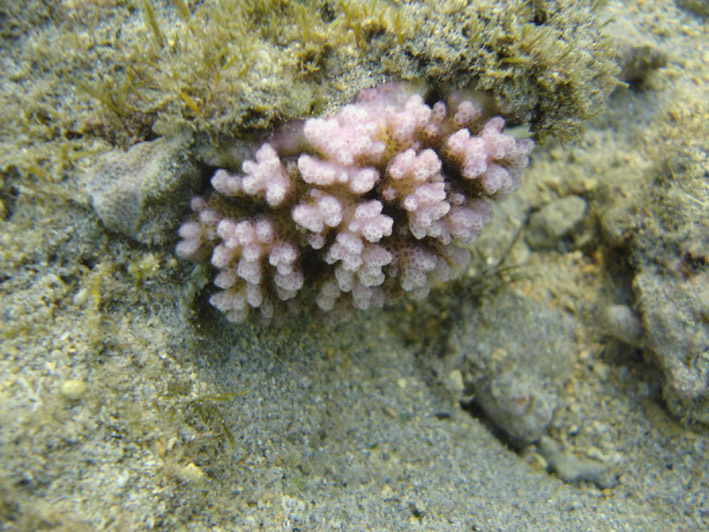
Pocillopora damicornis

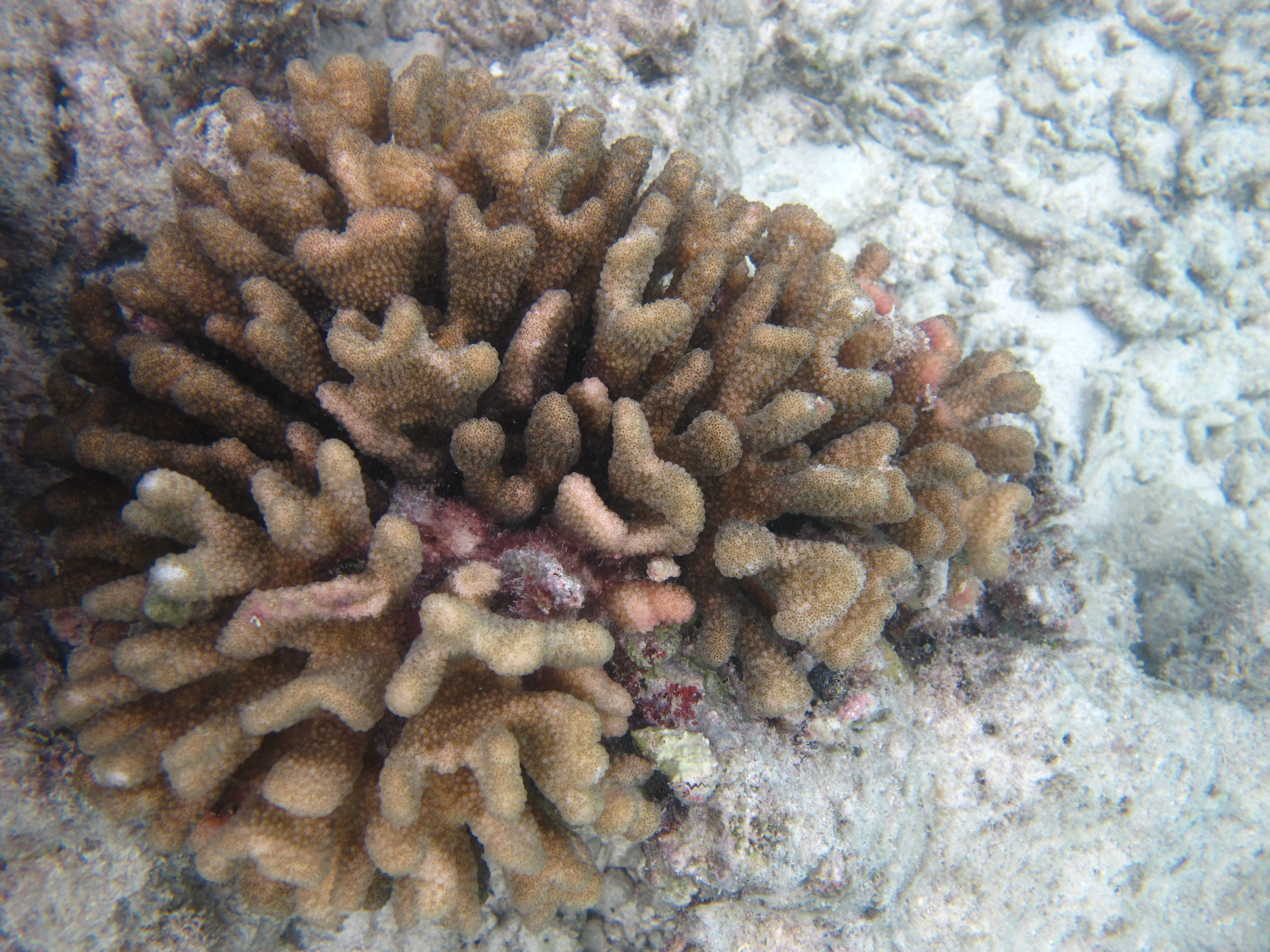
Pocillopora elegans

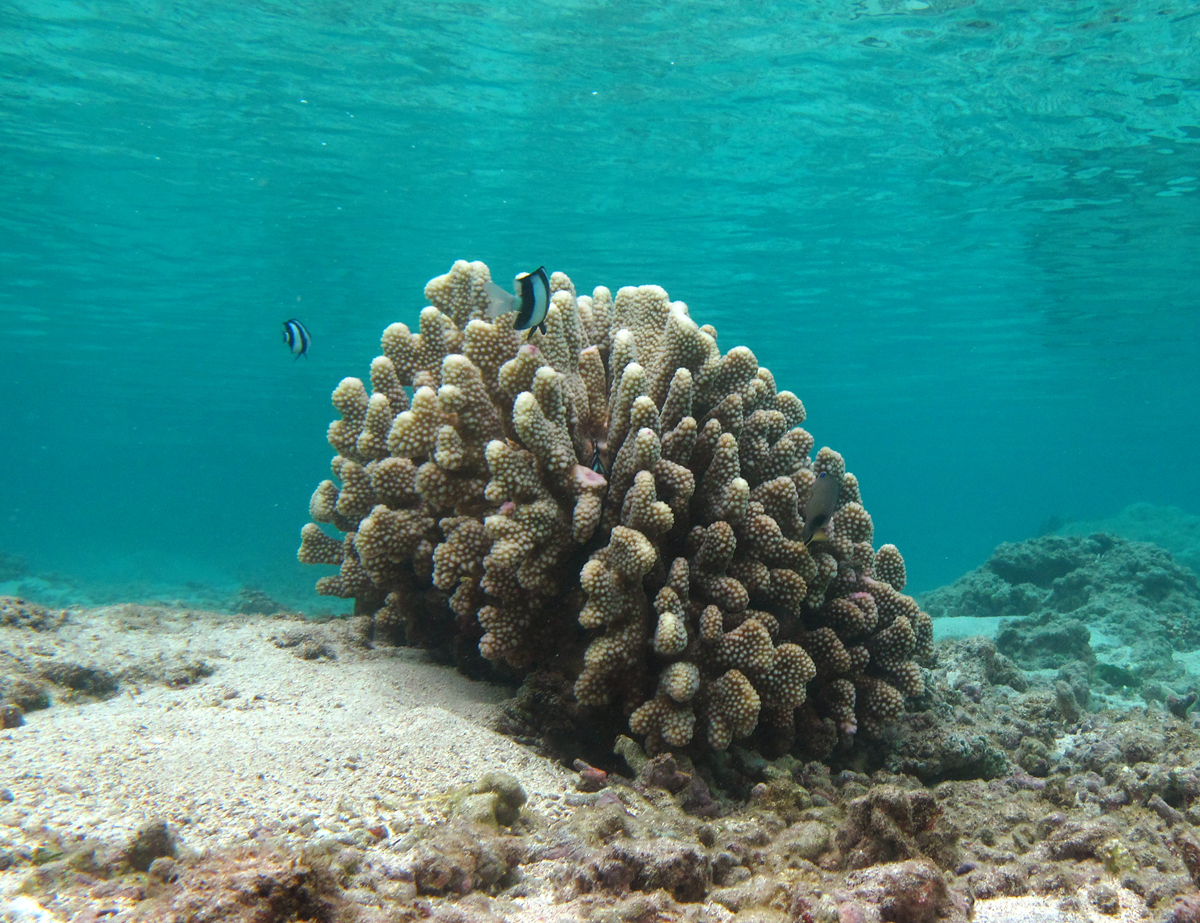
Pocillopora grandis

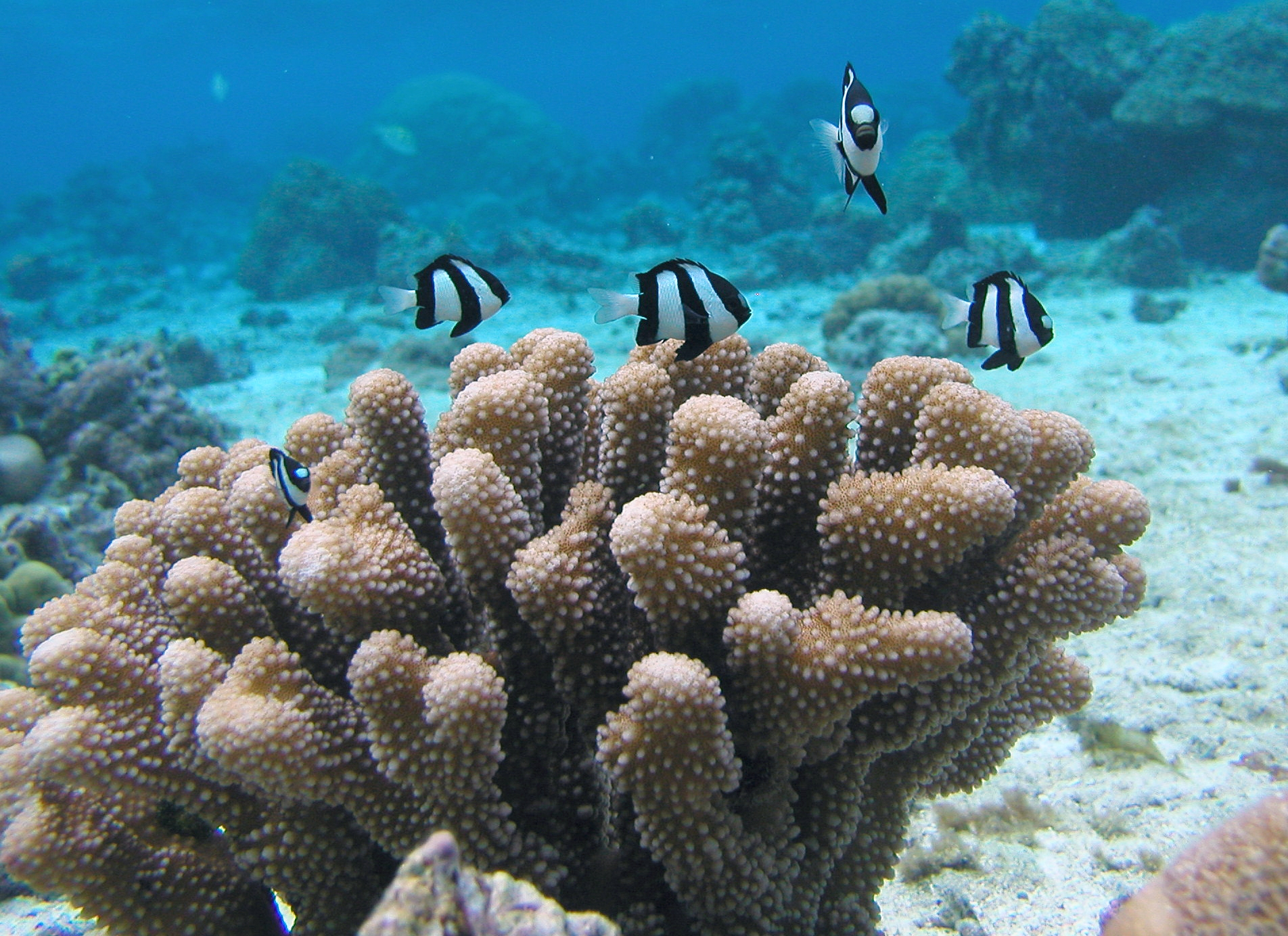
Pocillopora meandrina

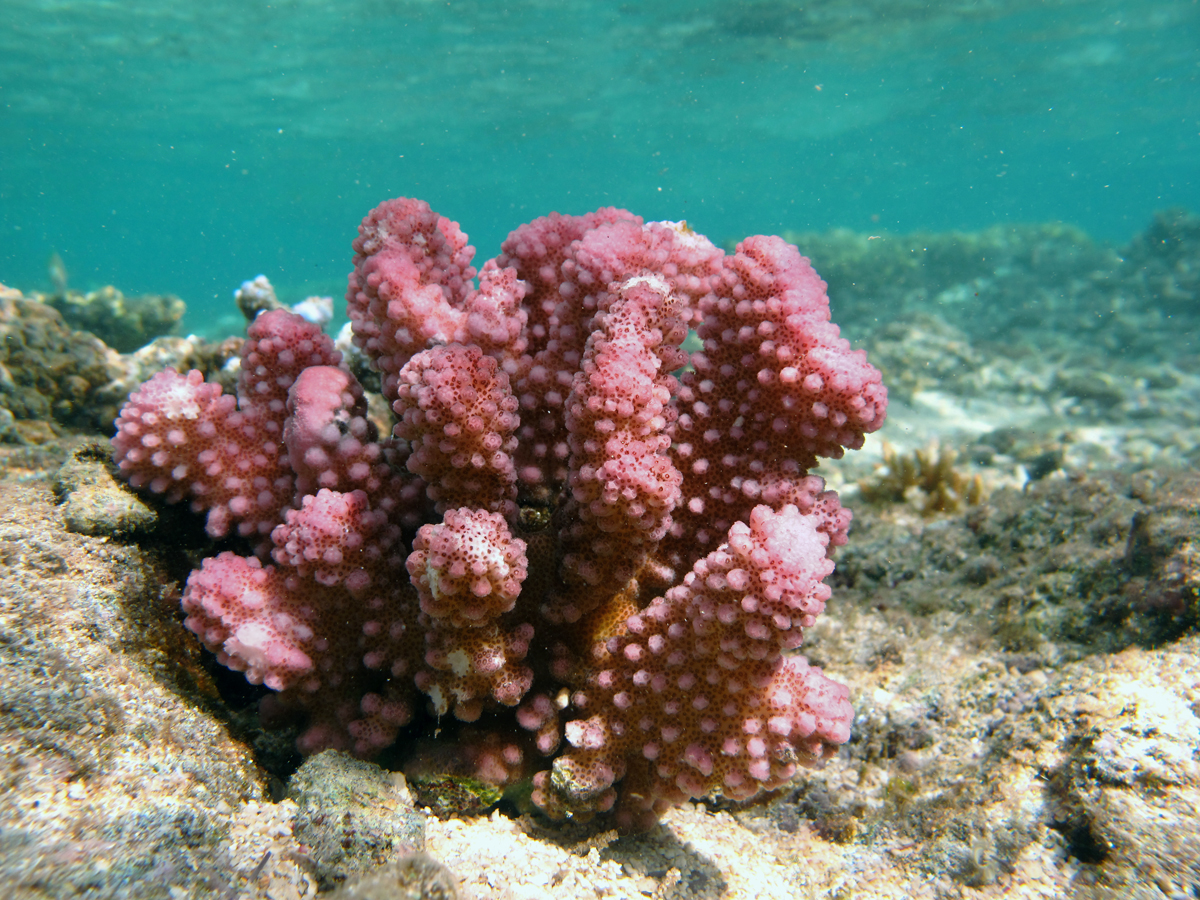
Pocillopora verrucosa

Non exhaustive gallery of symbionts

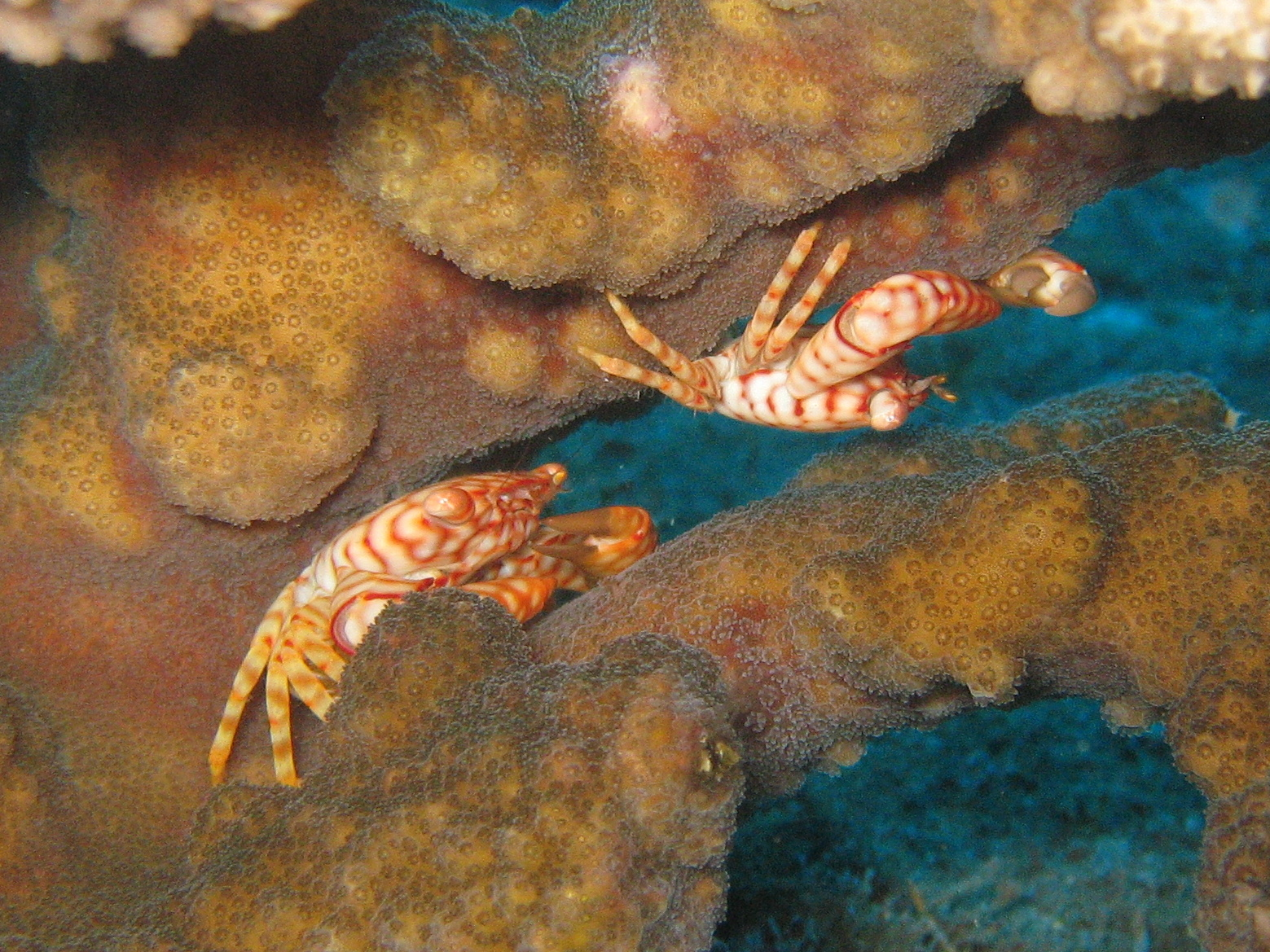
Trapezia flavopunctata

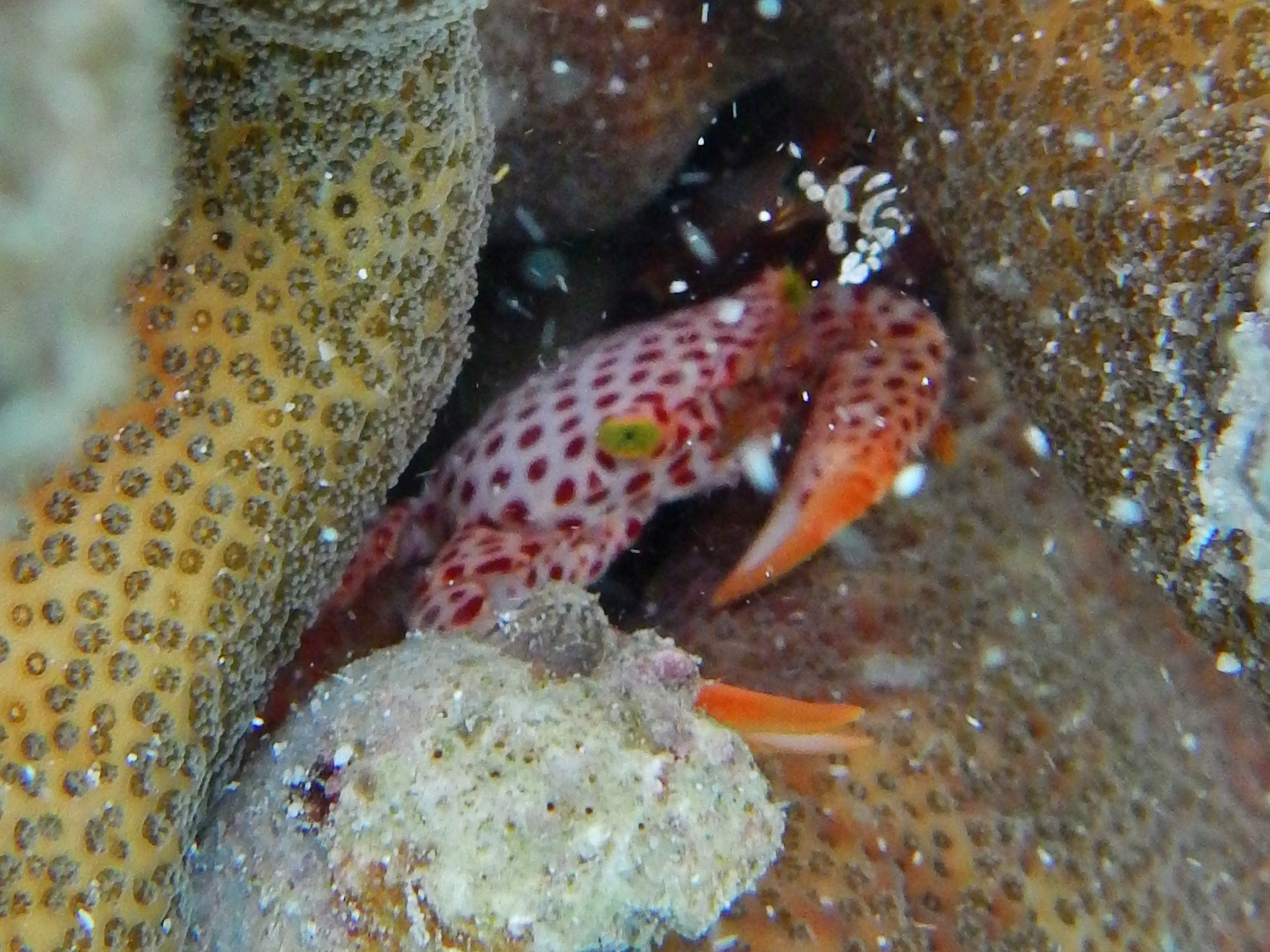
Trapezia rufopunctata

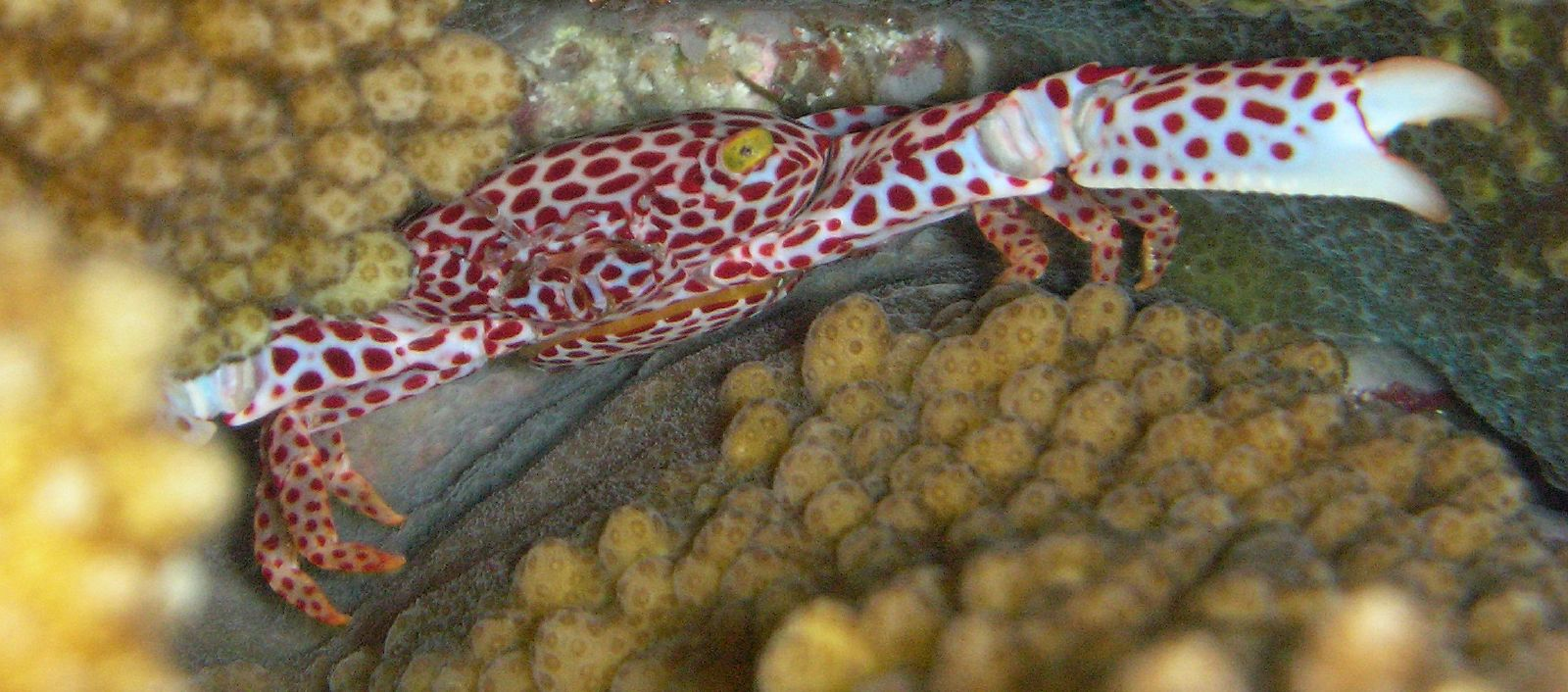
Trapezia tigrina

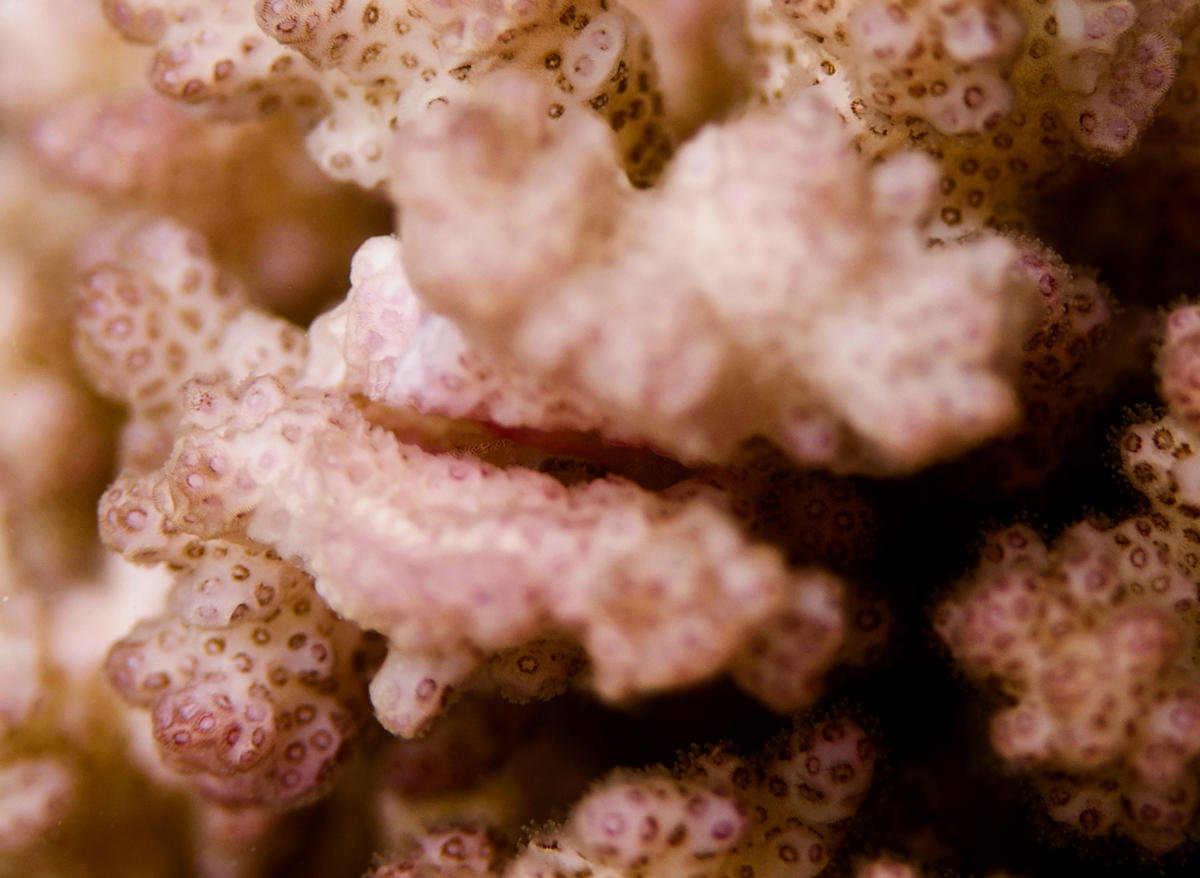
Scab due to a female of Cryptochiridae (probably Hapalocarcinus marsupialis)

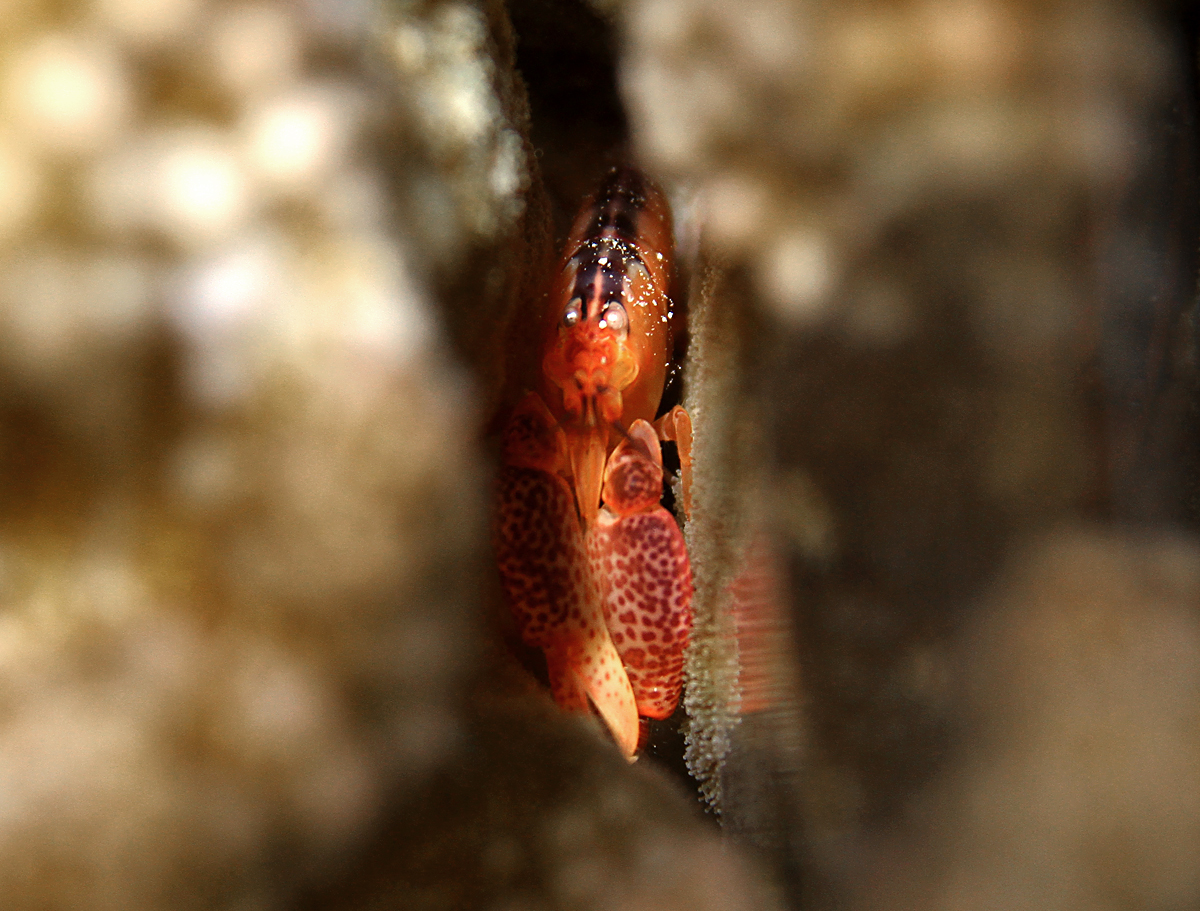
Alpheus lottini

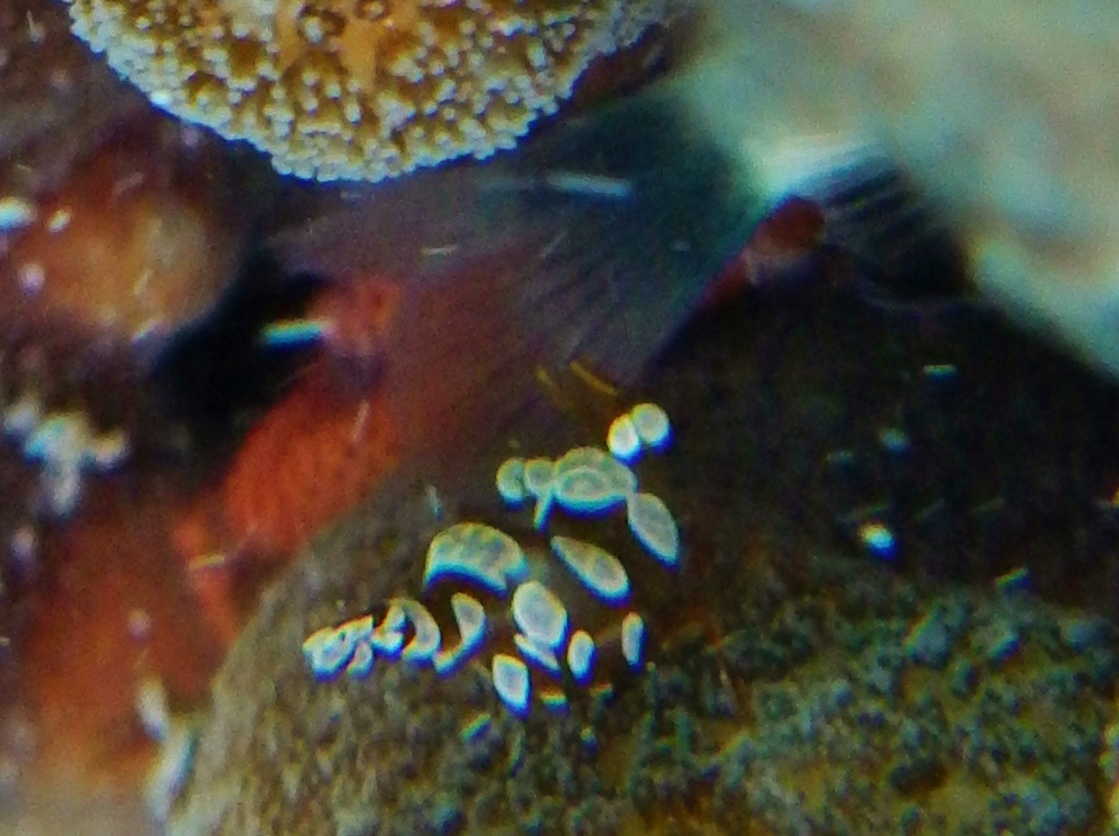
Thor amboinensis

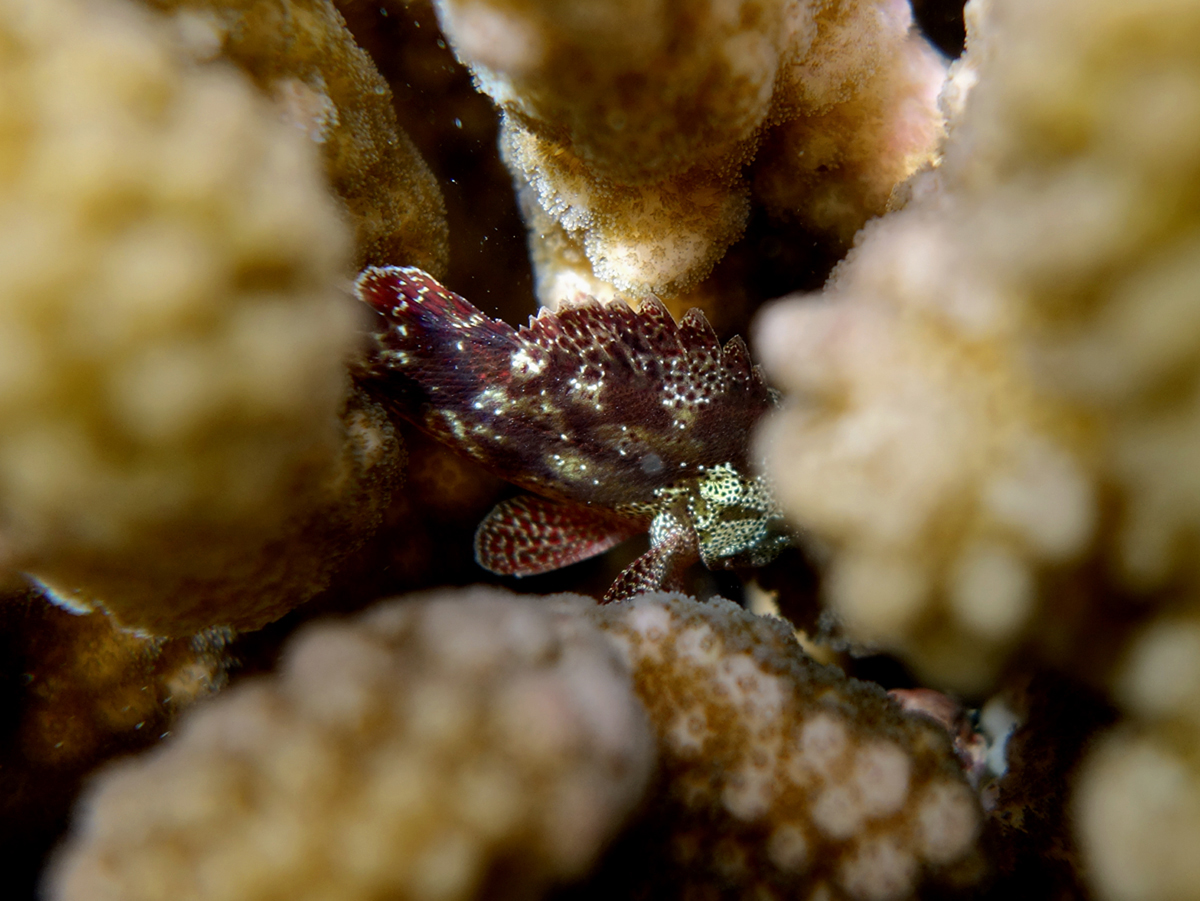
Sebastapistes tinkhami

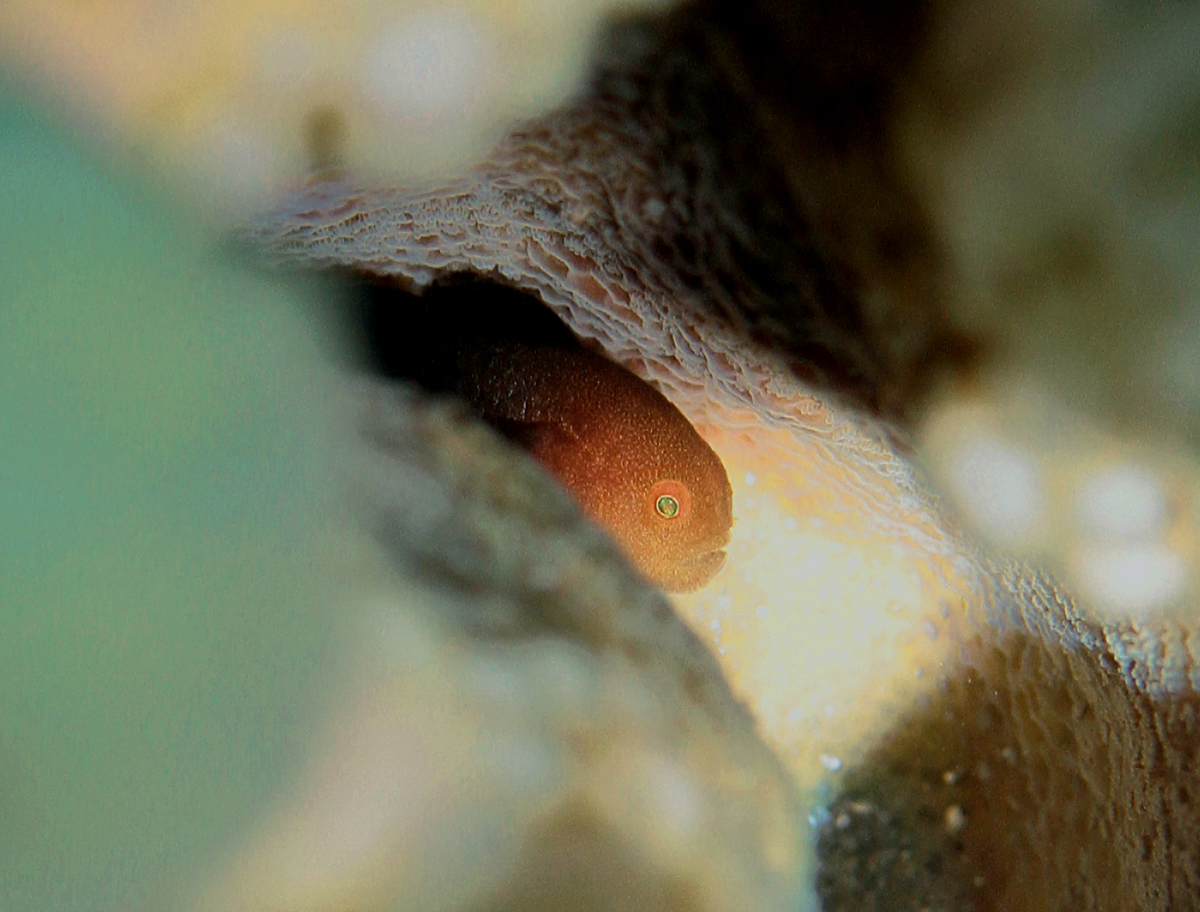
Paragobiodon modestus

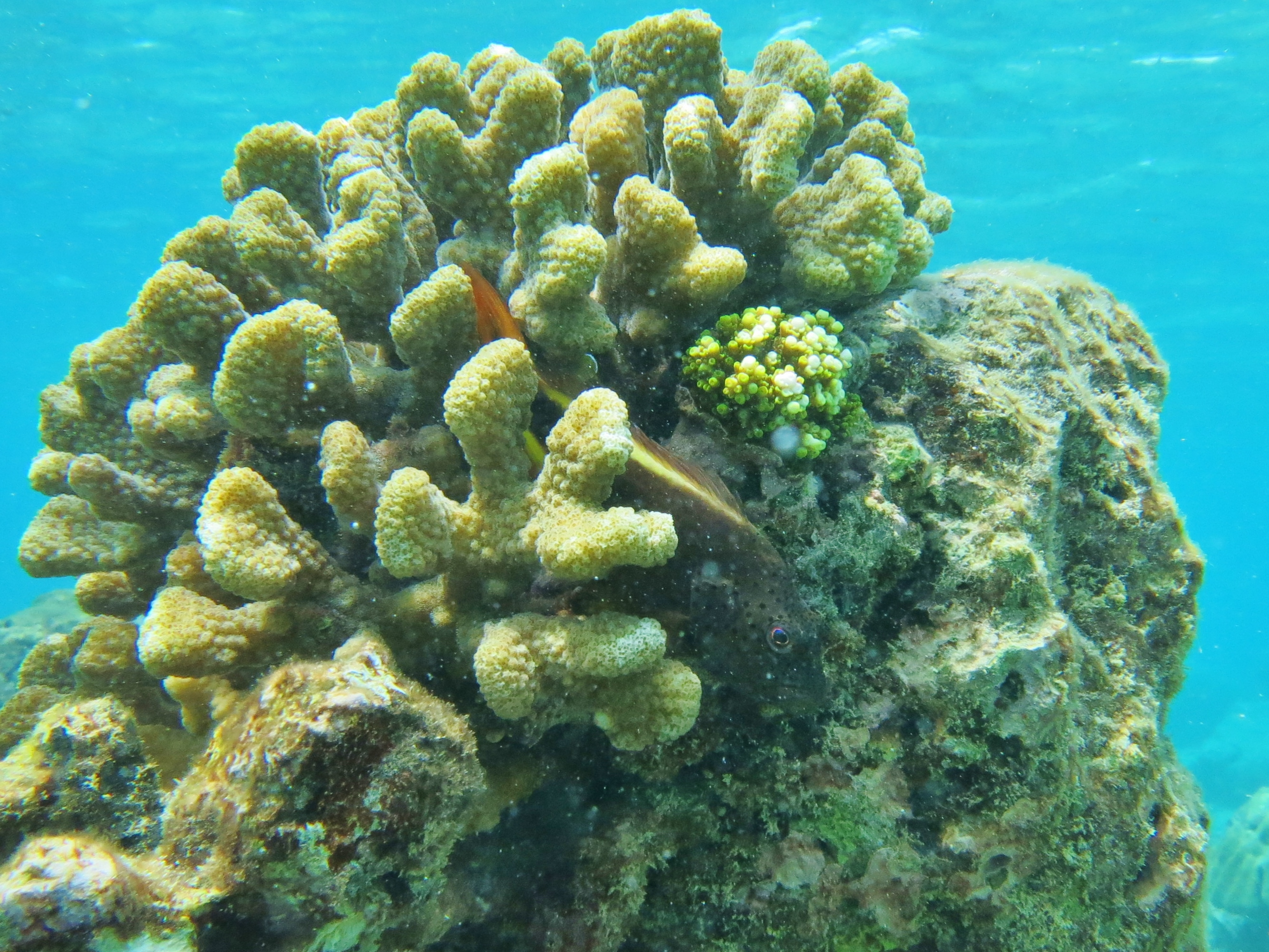
Paracirrhites forsteri
