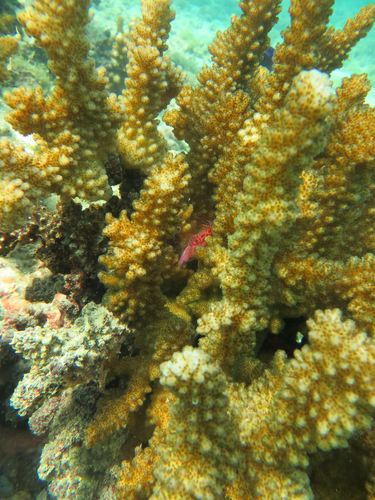

Conservation status
- Endangered (IUCN 3.1)

Scientific classification
- Kingdom: Animalia
- Phylum: Cnidaria
- Subphylum: Anthozoa
- Class: Hexacorallia
- Order: Scleractinia
- Family: Pocilloporidae
- Genus: Pocillopora
- Species: P. capitata

Binomial name
- Pocillopora capitata Verrill, 1864

Synonyms
- Pocillopora palmata Palmer, 1928; Pocillopora porosa Verrill, 1870; Pocillopora robusta Verrill, 1870

= Pocillopora capitata =

Species of coral

Pocillopora capitata, commonly known as the Cauliflower coral, is a principal hermatypic (or reef-building) coral found in the Eastern Tropical Pacific. P. capitata is a colonial species of stony coral of the class Anthozoa, the order Scleractinia, and the family Pocilloporidae. This species was first documented and described by Addison Emery Verrill in 1864. P. capitata is threatened by many of the effects of climate change, including — but not limited to — increased temperatures that cause bleaching and hypoxic conditions.

== Description and Morphology ==
The first known appearance of Pocillopora capitata in the fossil record occurred in the upper Pleistocene, approximately 0.126 million years ago.

As with all hermatypic corals, P. capitata is a benthic, substrate-attached, sessile marine species. The species also exhibits bilateral symmetry, has an imperforate skeleton, and usually has brown tissue coloration. Colonies of P. capitata may take on the shape of either an irregular mound or an openly branched system, in which branches are tall and cylindrical in appearance before flattening out towards the tips. Polyps of corals belonging to the family Pocilloporidae are all known to have a corallite structure with twelve poorly developed septa. Individual polyps possess twelve small tentacles arranged in a ring around the mouth that may outstretch during the day for feeding purposes. Retraction of the tentacles will result in the appearance of a fine, dark ring around the edge of the corallite calice. The arrangement of the calices themselves is typically crowded, often so much so that adjacent calices will touch; this crowding tends to happen particularly at the tips of coral branches. The verrucae — which are bumps of the sponge-like coenosteum that contain several corallites — of P. capitata are elongated but tend to exhibit irregular patterns of size and distribution across the coral's branches.

Morphological intraspecific variation has been observed with regard to geographic distribution; for instance, whereas P. capitata of the Panamic region tend to possess small columella, P. capitata found in the waters surrounding the Galapagos Islands have much more pronounced columella and verrucae that give the coral branches a thorny appearance. When P. capitata tissue is analyzed on a dry weight basis, it is found to be composed of approximately 34% lipids.

Corallivory has been shown to have a significant impact upon the physical appearance of P. capitata, as branches of P. capitata will exhibit loss of verrucae and become swollen at the branch tips. However, studies which have transferred preyed-upon coral into corallivore-free aquarium habitats have demonstrated that recovery and return to normal growth is possible if the species is given several months of isolation from predators.

== Habitat and Geographic Distribution ==
The Pocillopora genus of corals generally dominates the coral reef ecosystems of the far Eastern Tropical Pacific, a region heavily impacted by the flow of the warm, eastward Equatorial Counter Current. P. capitata is found in the shallow foreshore zones of coral reefs of the subtropical Pacific, almost exclusively in the far east of the Pacific oceanic basin. Coordinate-wise, P. capitata ranges from 26°N to 5°S and from 115°E to 77°W. P. capitata has been found to inhabit Panamà, Colombia — including the Gorgona islands — the Gulf of California, and Ecuador, including the offshore Galapagos archipelago (with the exceptions of Fernandina Island and Isabela Island). In the Mexican Central Pacific, P. capitata can be found dwelling amongst the La Boquita, Carrizales, and Tenacatita coral reefs.

P. capitata can typically be found at depths between 0 and 40 meters below sea level; however, in the Galapagos Islands, P. capitata typically inhabits depths ranging between 3 and 12 meters below the sea's surface. Due to their preferred depth range and typical distribution within the foreshore region of coral reefs, P. capitata tends to experience high levels of wave exposure. As with most Scleractinian corals — which are defined by their obligatory symbiotic relationships with photosynthetic endosymbiont dinoflagellates of the order Symbiodiniaceae — P. capitata prefers marine habitat with low turbidity (e.g. clear water habitat). The water temperature of marine regions containing P. capitata typically ranges from around 22.3°C to around 26.8°C.

== Reproduction ==
As with many other members of the class Anthozoa, P. capitata may be either gonochoric or hermaphroditic. Like other Scleractinian corals, P. capitata uses both asexual and sexual reproductive strategies, and has been known to generationally alternate between the two. When reproducing, polyps will release mature gametes into the water column through the mouth from the coelenteron — the central body cavity of cnidarians.

== Development and Early Life History ==
After fertilization has occurred and the zygote phase has been reached, individuals initiate their life cycles as planktonic planula larva, meaning that the larvae are free-swimming and possess multiple cilia that aid with such locomotion. Metamorphosis of P. capitata includes development of morphological features such as the septa, tentacles, and pharynx, after which point the larva will settle aboral side down on the substrate of a coral reef and begin to develop into its adult form.

== Threats ==
Changes in marine ecosystems related to the effects of global climate change pose serious threats to P. capitata. Among these are ocean acidification and ocean hypoxia, both of which are causes of coral bleaching. Ocean acidification — which is a result of the absorption of excess atmospheric CO_{2} into the ocean and causes a decrease in the pH of the water — creates an intolerably harsh environment for corals. Cases of P. capitata bleaching have already been recorded. For instance, in the summer of 2004, 12% of the P. capitata on the island of La Boquita were observed to have suffered bleaching. Global warming is also correlated with decreased levels of dissolved oxygen in the ocean, known as ocean hypoxia. As corals require oxygen for proper biological molecular functioning, they require a specific threshold of dissolved oxygen in the water to be maintained in order to survive, and suffer when oxygen levels fall below this threshold. Ocean warming has led to increased upwelling of oxygen-depleted water to surface regions, a trend that affects regions of the Eastern Pacific inhabited by P. capitata. The anoxic conditions created by this increased upwelling particularly threaten P. capitata individuals inhabiting lower depths of coral reef ecosystems, which are more directly impacted by this influx of anoxic water.

As an important structural reef-building coral, the decline of P. capitata is also detrimental to the rich coral reef habitat it helps to create and the species that rely upon it.
