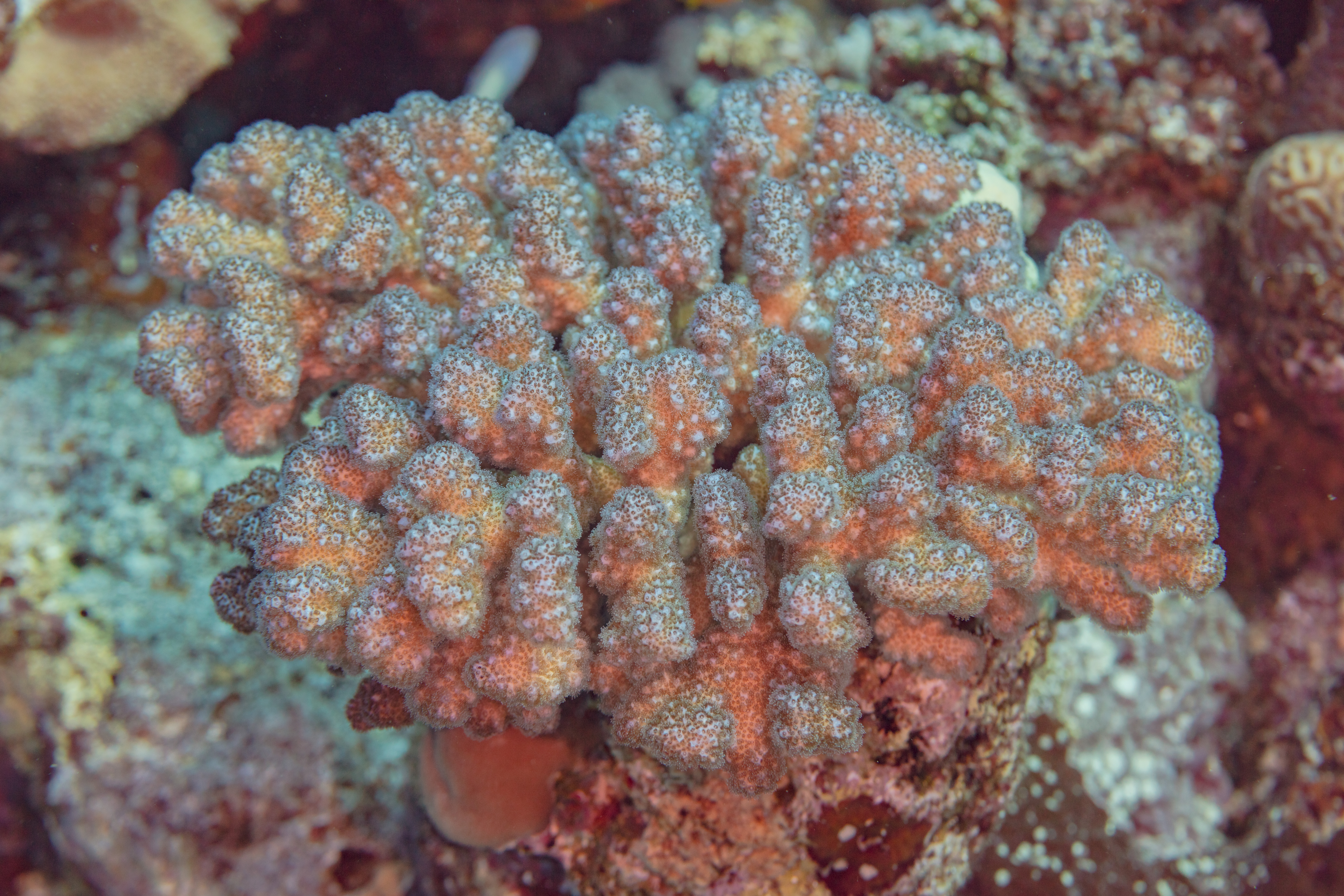

Conservation status
- Endangered (IUCN 3.1)

Scientific classification
- Kingdom: Animalia
- Phylum: Cnidaria
- Subphylum: Anthozoa
- Class: Hexacorallia
- Order: Scleractinia
- Family: Pocilloporidae
- Genus: Pocillopora
- Species: P. verrucosa

Binomial name
- Pocillopora verrucosa (Ellis and Solander, 1786)

Synonyms
- List: Madrepora verrucosa Ellis & Solander, 1786; Pocillopora aspera danae Verrill, 1864; Pocillopora danae Verrill, 1864; Pocillopora hemprichi Ehrenberg, 1834

= Pocillopora verrucosa =

Species of coral

Pocillopora verrucosa, commonly known as cauliflower coral, rasp coral, or knob-horned coral, is a species of stony coral in the family Pocilloporidae. It is native to tropical and subtropical parts of the Indian and Pacific Oceans.

== Description ==
Pocillopora verrucosa is a colonial coral and grows into hemispherical clumps up to 30 cm (12 in) in diameter. The branches are 1 to 2 cm (0.4 to 0.8 in) thick and usually have clubbed tips. The surface is covered with large verrucae (wart-like growths) up to 6 mm (0.24 in) high and the corallites (the stony cups from which the polyps emerge) are 1 mm (0.04 in) in diameter. The colour of this coral varies and it may be yellowish-green, pink, brown or bluish-brown. It differs from Pocillopora damicornis in having broader, somewhat flattened, club-tipped branches and by the fact that its verrucae are more evenly sized and spaced.

== Distribution and habitat ==
Pocillopora verrucosa is native to the tropical and subtropical parts of the Indian and Pacific Oceans. Its wide range extends from East Africa and the Red Sea to Japan, Indonesia, Australia, Hawaii, Easter Island and the western coast of Central America. It is found at depths down to about 54 m (177 ft) but is most common between 1 and 15 m (3 ft 3 in and 49 ft 3 in). It is a common species in most of its range and is found on fringing reefs and moderately-exposed reef fronts but is less tolerant than P. damicornis of sediment and is therefore less common in lagoons.

== Biology ==
Pocillopora verrucosa, like many corals, contains microscopic symbiotic dinoflagellate algae (zooxanthellae) living within its tissues. Through photosynthesis, these algae produce energy-rich molecules that the coral can assimilate. It has been found that these algae are already present in the eggs before spawning.

Pocillopora verrucosa can reproduce by fragmentation, a form of asexual reproduction. It is also a simultaneous hermaphrodite but its reproductive method varies across its range. Each polyp usually contains twelve gonads, the six nearest the mouth being ovaries and the other six spermaries. In South Africa the gametes are released simultaneously from both of these and spawning takes place at new moon in January (mid-summer) with the gametes being liberated into the water column. However, at Enewetak Atoll in the Marshall Islands, this species has been shown to fertilise the eggs internally and brood the developing planula larvae.

== Ecology ==
A number of predators feed on this coral. These include pufferfishes, parrotfishes and filefishes which feed on the tips of the branches and hermit crabs which scrape the skeletal tissue. Other animals feed on the soft tissues while leaving the skeleton intact including the butterflyfishes, the angelfishes and the damselfish, Stegastes acapulcoensis. Invertebrates which feed on this coral are the crown-of-thorns starfish (Acanthaster planci), Jenner's cowry (Jenneria pustulata), the sea urchin, Eucidaris galapagensis and the coral snails, Coralliophila spp.. Both the starfish and the cowry can kill a mature coral colony by stripping off the living tissue.

Pocillopora spp. have several mutualistic symbionts including the crab, Trapezia sp., and certain snapping shrimps which protect it from attack by its major predator, the crown-of-thorns starfish.

== Status ==
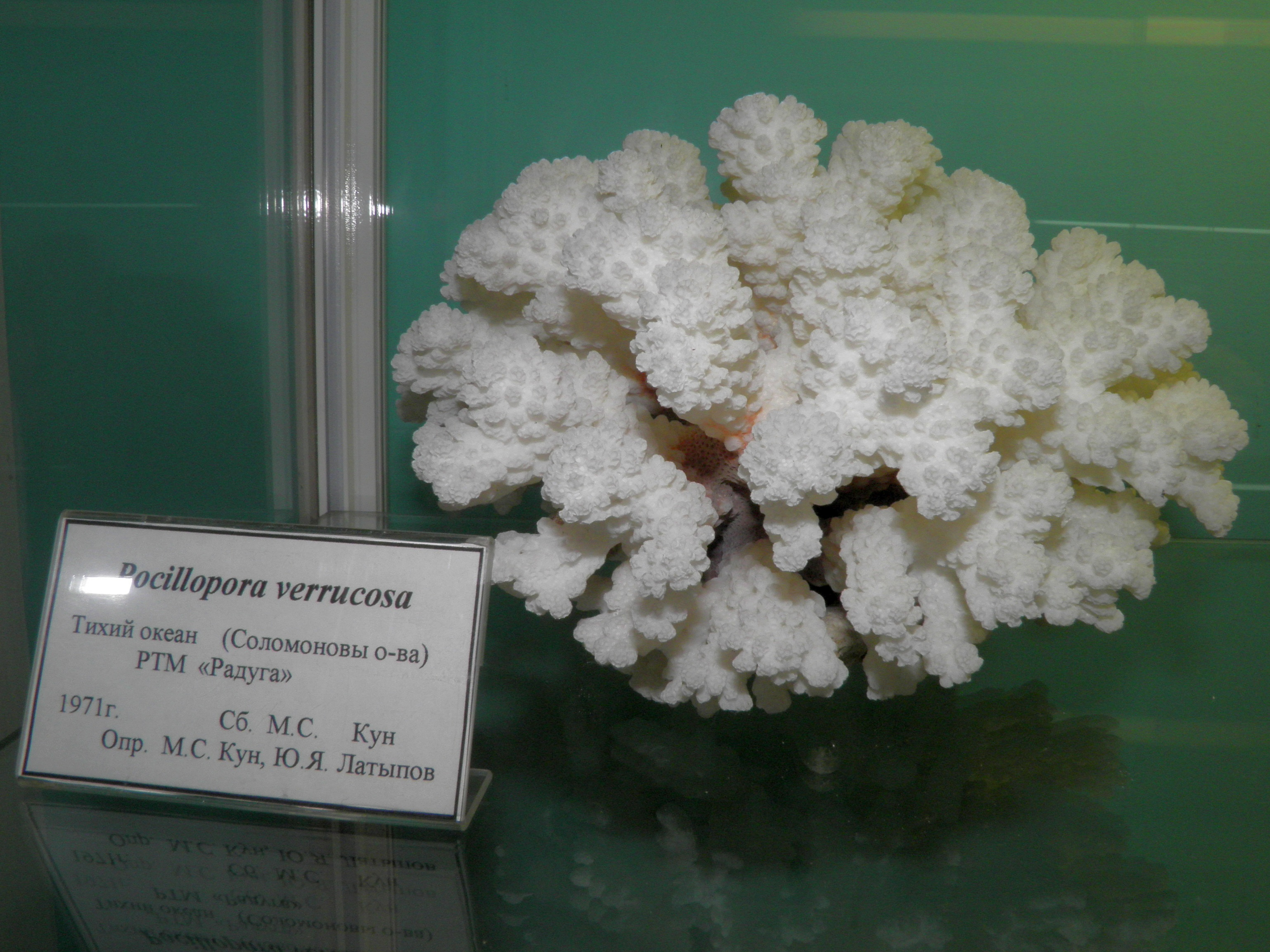
Pocillopora verrucosa skeleton

In general coral reefs around the world are being destroyed and although this coral is common and relatively resilient, it is likely that populations are in decline along with their habitat. The main threats are climate change, ocean acidification, bleaching and coral diseases. The IUCN has listed Pocillopora verrucosa as being of "Least Concern" as it considers that the rate of decline in its populations is not sufficient to justify listing it in a more threatened category. Like all corals, it is listed on CITES Appendix II.
