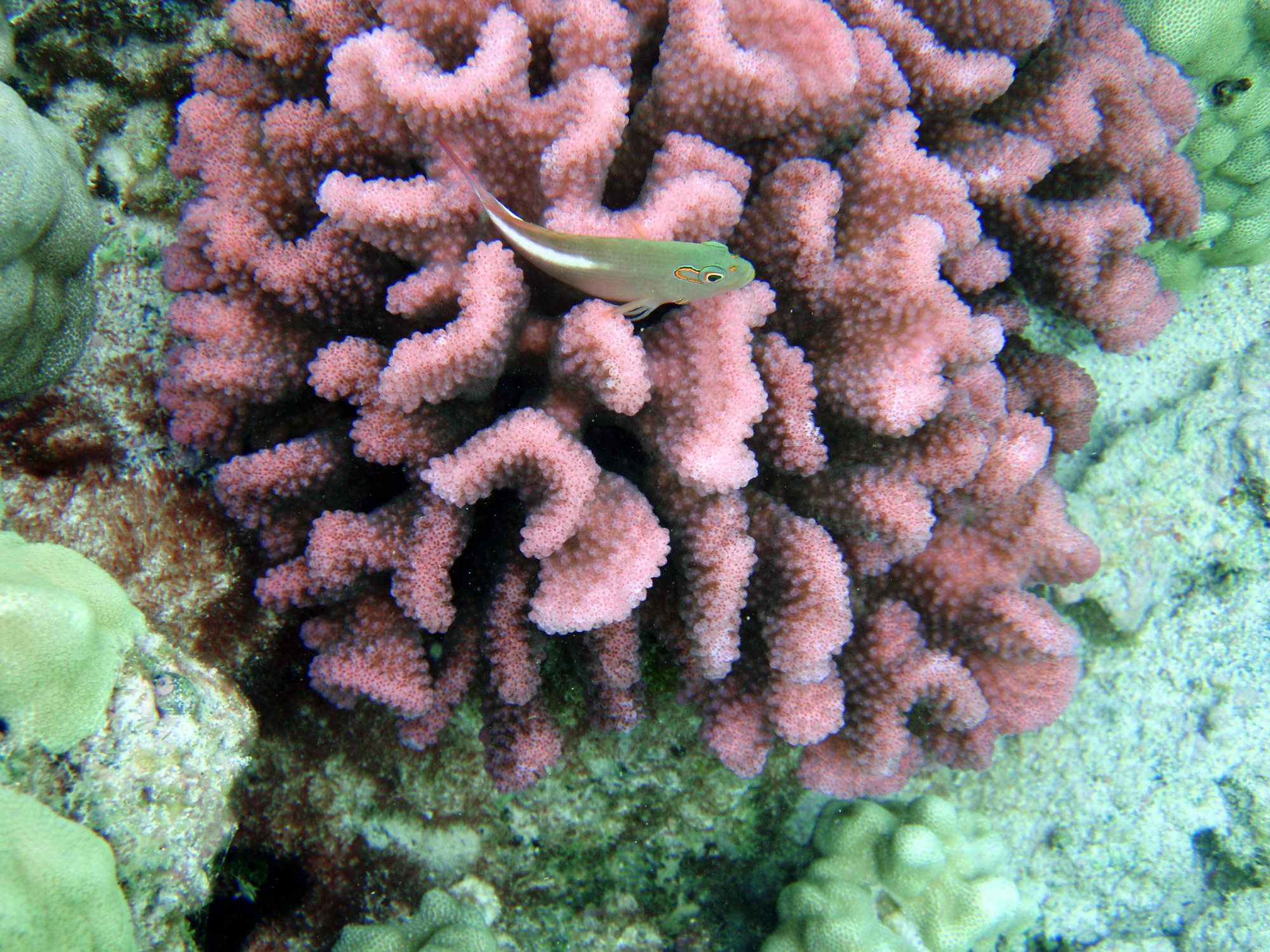

Conservation status
- Endangered (IUCN 3.1)

Scientific classification
- Kingdom: Animalia
- Phylum: Cnidaria
- Subphylum: Anthozoa
- Class: Hexacorallia
- Order: Scleractinia
- Family: Pocilloporidae
- Genus: Pocillopora
- Species: P. meandrina

Binomial name
- Pocillopora meandrina Dana, 1846

Synonyms
- Pocillopora elegans meandrina Dana, 1846; Pocillopora meandrina var. tuberosa Verrill, 1869; Pocillopora nobilis var. tuberosa Verrill, 1869; Pocillopora meandrina var. nobilis Verrill, 1864; Pocillopora nobilis Verill, 1864

= Pocillopora meandrina =

Species of coral

Pocillopora meandrina, commonly known as cauliflower coral, is a species of coral occurring in the Indo-Pacific and Pacific oceans. This coral lives in shallow reef environments.

== Description ==
The colonies of P. meandrina can be fairly solid and dome-shaped or branching with areas that are either flattened and ridge-like or fine and convoluted. The colonies are covered by wart-like growths called verrucae. The colour ranges from brown to pink and the polyps with their extended tentacles are usually visible only at night.

== Distribution and habitat ==
P. meandrina occurs in the Indian and Pacific Oceans and is found across a range of habitats that include exposed reefs, protected lagoons and lower reef slopes.

== Biology ==
Spawning P. meandrina.

P. meandrina is a hermaphrodite and each polyp contains four sets of male and four sets of female gonads. The larvae develop inside the body of the polyp and are not expelled into the water until they are mature. They remain free swimming for a number of weeks before settling and starting to build a hard matrix. The polyps can also reproduce asexually by fragmentation.

The polyps feed by capturing tiny prey with their tentacles. They also contain zooxanthellae, microscopic algae, which are able to photosynthesise. These symbionts produce energy-rich compounds which the polyps metabolise while the rigid structure of the shallow water coral provides a stable, well-lit, protective environment for the algae to flourish.

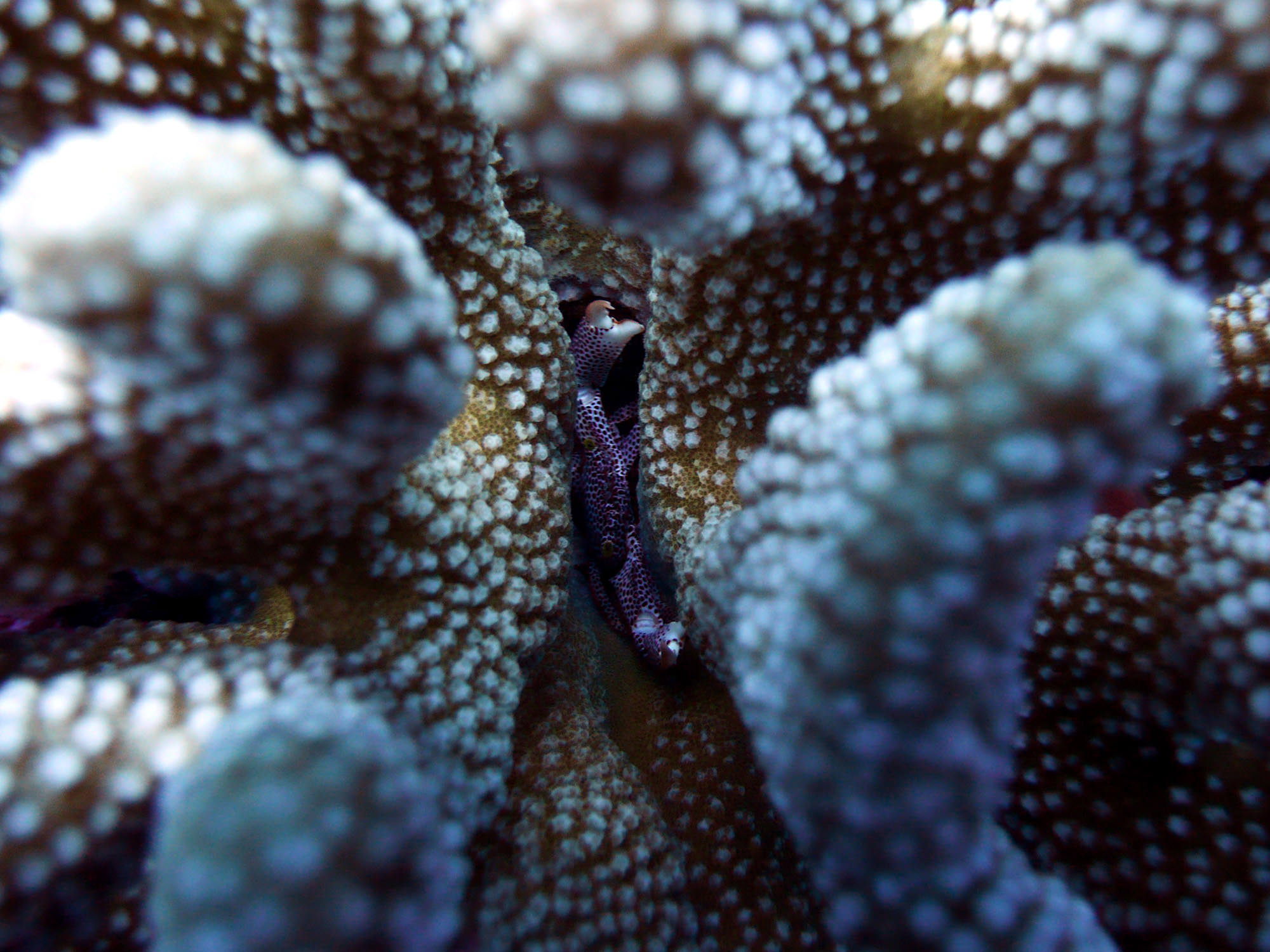
A red-spotted guard crab living in a cauliflower coral.

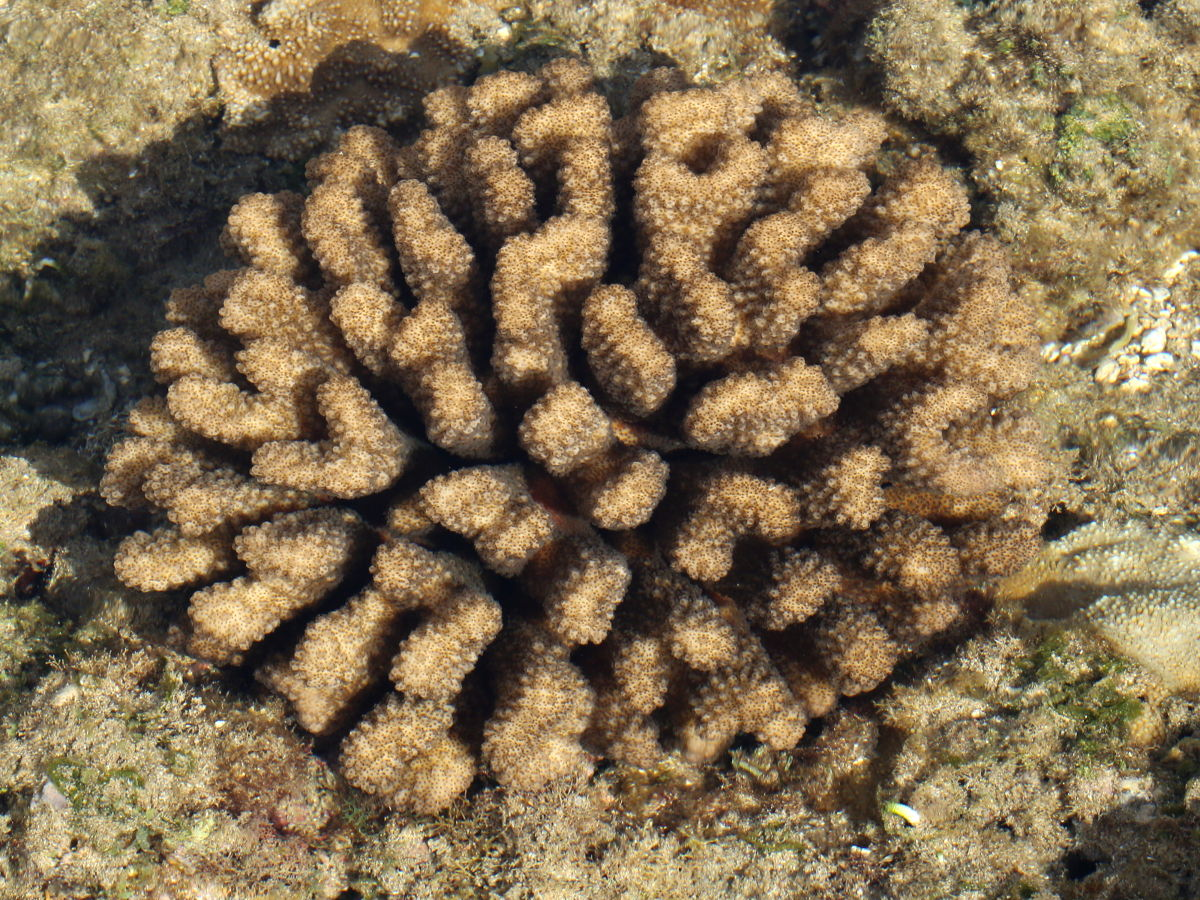
In tidepool, Hawaii,
