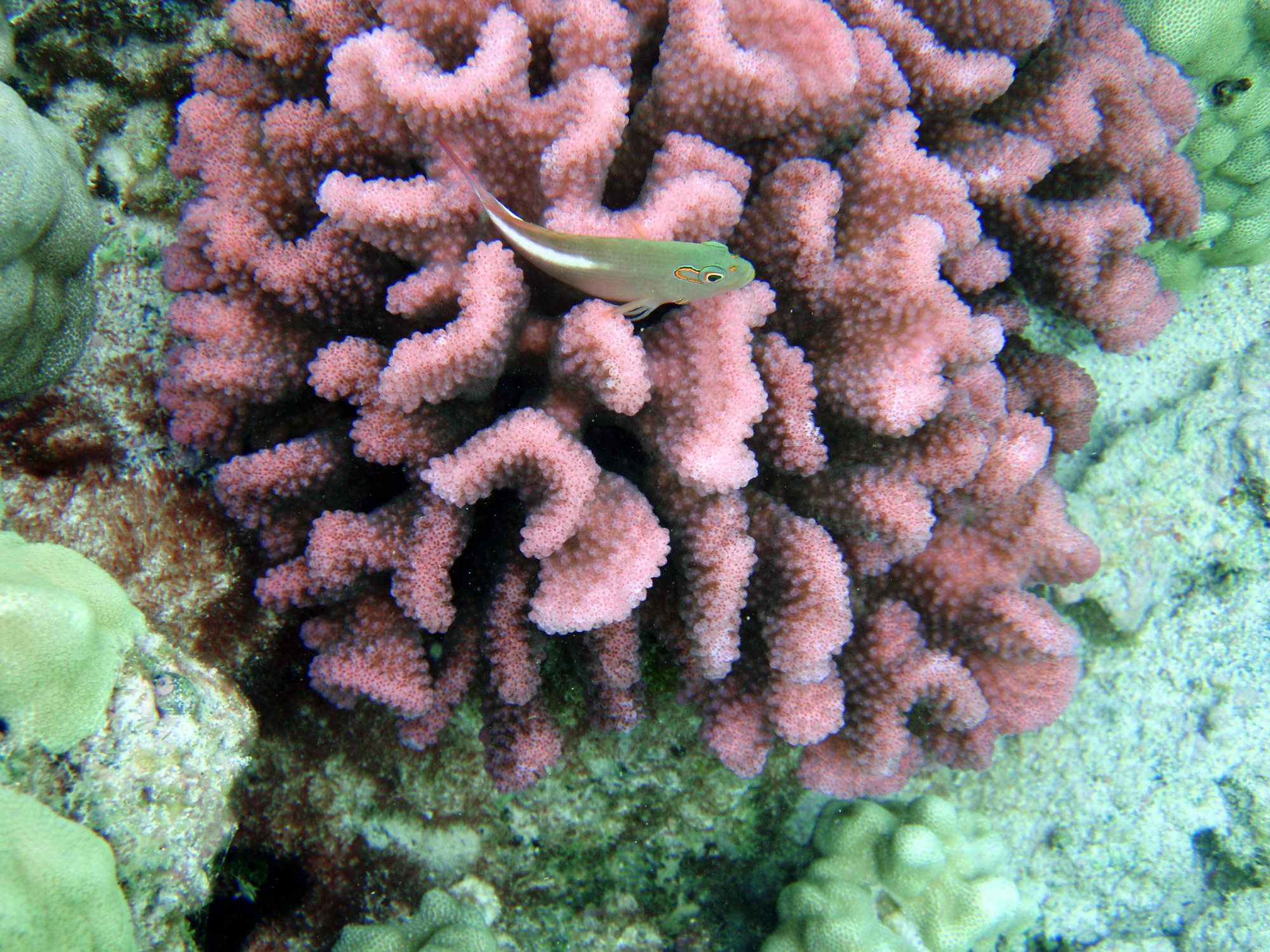
- Pocillopora meandrina

Scientific classification
- Kingdom: Animalia
- Phylum: Cnidaria
- Subphylum: Anthozoa
- Class: Hexacorallia
- Order: Scleractinia
- Family: Pocilloporidae; Gray, 1842

Genera
- See text

Synonyms
- Seriatoporidae Milne Edwards & Haime, 1849

= Pocilloporidae =

Family of corals

The Pocilloporidae are a family of stony corals in the order Scleractinia occurring in the Pacific and Indian Oceans.

== Description ==
Pocilloporids are colonial and most species are reef-building. They are very variable in size and shape, some being submassive and others arborescent or ramose. The corallites are small and vary from being sunken to being raised cones. The columellae are well developed and the septa may be fused with them. The coenosteum lining the skeleton is covered with spinules. The Pocilloporidae are closely related to the other coral families, Astrocoeniidae and Acroporidae.

== Biology ==
The genera in this family are polymorphic, differing in growth form according to their habitat, but showing similar growth forms in response to light availability and wave action. The colonies are hermaphrodites. The sperm is liberated into the sea and finds its way into other polyps. After internal fertilisation, the planula larvae are brooded by the parent before being ejected into the water column. This means the dispersal distances are small, but the likelihood of finding a suitable substrate on which to settle are raised.

== Genera ==
The World Register of Marine Species lists these genera in the family:-

- Madracis Milne Edwards & Haime, 1849
- Pocillopora Lamarck, 1816
- Seriatopora Lamarck, 1816
- Stylophora Schweigger, 1820
