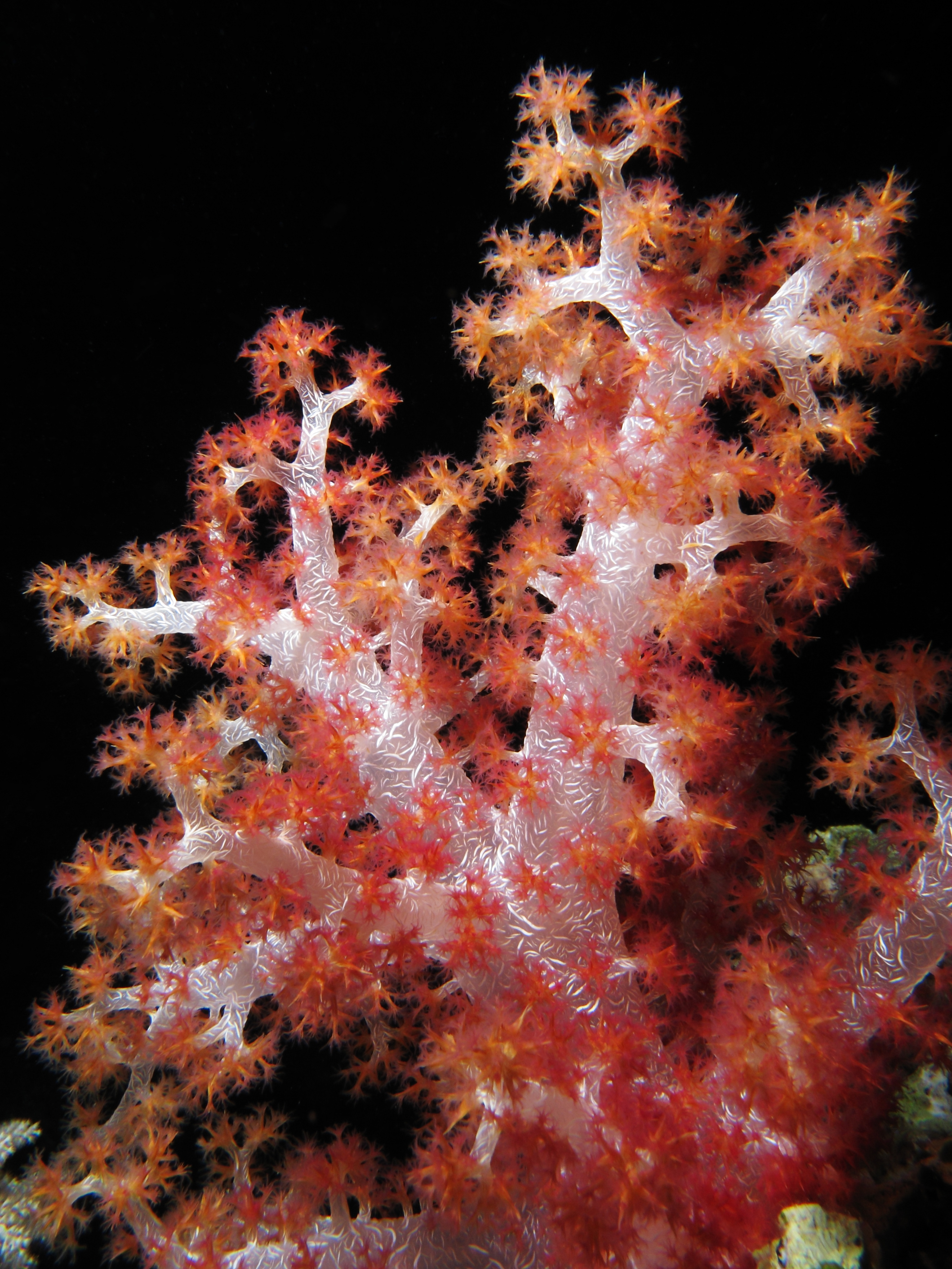

Scientific classification
- Kingdom: Animalia
- Phylum: Cnidaria
- Subphylum: Anthozoa
- Class: Octocorallia
- Order: Malacalcyonacea
- Family: Nephtheidae
- Genus: Dendronephthya
- Species: D. hemprichi

Binomial name
- Dendronephthya hemprichi Klunzinger, 1877

= Dendronephthya hemprichi =

Species of coral

Dendronephthya hemprichi is a common soft coral found from Red Sea to Western Pacific. In May 2023 on the Mediterranean coast of Israel exactly on the coasts of the city of Sdot Yam many specimens were filmed, subsequently it was also photographed in Lebanon In Byblos.It is usually pink or orange with transparent trunk and it grows up to 70 cm. It exists at 30° N latitude. The smallest unit of this coral, like all other corals, is a polyp. This particular species of the Dendronephthya has the ability to reproduce sexually and asexually through broadcast spawning and clonal propagation, respectively.

== Reproductive Behavior ==
D. hemprichi is gonochoric – sexually binary – with colonies releasing either eggs or sperm. As a broadcasting species, in terms of sexual reproductive ability, it participates in mass spawning events in which the coral releases its gametes (eggs or sperm) into the water where they fertilize. The fertilized egg becomes an embryo and further develops into coral larvae, called planulae.

Generally, coral reefs are located between 30° S to 30° N latitude. At 30°N latitude, D. hemprichi is unlike the majority of soft corals at high latitudes that participate in annual spawning events. Instead, it follows a diurnal spawning pattern in which gametes are released every day.

The expansion of polyps facilitates the release of gametes. In turn, polyps expand and contract in response to flow rates of water currents. Since D. hemprichi is located in a region with strong water currents, its polyps have adapted to expanding and releasing gametes only when the water flow rate is between 3–25 cm/s. To increase the probability of successful reproduction, this species anchors the egg to the mouth of the polyps with a thread of mucus for a short period of time so that sperm released by male colonies in the area may fertilize the egg.

In addition to its sexual reproductive capabilities, this species of Dendronephthya is also able to reproduce asexually through the process of clonal propagation. This method of reproduction facilitates rapid aggregation of biomass to allow D. hemprichi to dominate a zooxanthellate environment despite being an azooxanthellate organism.

In the process of fragmentation, a small piece, 2–5 mm in length, made up of a few polyps, breaks off from the parent colony in a process that lasts about 20 hours in length. However, a parent colony may have hundreds of fragments detaching simultaneously. These fragments have root-like processes at their base to enable attachment to different surfaces. Due to the unipolar orientation of these roots as well as the fragments’ negative buoyancy causing them to sink, they attach more commonly to upper surfaces of horizontal substrata as well as vertical surfaces, though at a lesser rate. Many of the vertical surfaces are artificial substrata of oil jetties located near Eilat.

Despite more fragments attaching to horizontal surfaces, it is ultimately the coral populations on the artificial vertical surfaces that have a higher survival rate. This is due to the higher susceptibility of the vertical coral to prevalent strong water currents transporting phytoplankton, the nutritional supply of this azooxanthellate soft coral.

== Ecology ==
=== Herbivory ===
D. hemprichi ingests phytoplankton through the process of passive suspension filter feeding. The anatomy of each polyp plays a role in optimizing the coral's ability to filter nutrients. As an octocoral, each polyp contains eight tentacles with pinnules lining the tentacles, thus increasing surface area to maximize filtration. The use of phytoplankton by this species as its main energy source was determined through fluorescence microscopy, measurement of phaeopigments levels, and observation of phytoplankton accumulation in the gut of starved D. hemprichi. As catabolites of phytoplankton, phaeopigments are used to measure the amount of phytoplankton digested by the coral. Fluorescent microscopy verifies the presence of the phytoplankton, while the accumulation of phytoplankton in starved D. hemprichi and subsequent increasing levels of phaeopigments determine that phytoplankton is being consumed and digested. Furthermore, the depletion of phytoplankton concentrations in water currents downstream of D. hemprichi colonies also support the energetic pathway designating phytoplankton as the main source of energy for D. hemprichi.

=== Niche ===
D. hemprichi is found on steep slopes between 1–32 meters of the benthic zone in the Red Sea. This depth is prone to strong currents generated by wind on the surface of the water. In addition, another Dendronephthya species, D. sinaiensis, also exists between 11 and 32 m. In this case, D. sinaiensis has longer and denser pinnules, limiting its consumption to consume smaller phytoplankton. In addition, D. hemprichi has larger sclerites that form its exoskeleton, causing it to be less flexible in behavior. The differences in sizes of pinnules and sclerites of these two species support Gause's theory of niche partitioning.

== Human Impact ==
The coral reefs of Eilat host a large number of divers, ranging from scientists to novices seeking a thrill. In addition, there are also many oil jetties off the coast of the city. Diving pressure and the behavior of industries disrupt the local habitat through man made disturbances. Some of these disruptions include coral breakages and damages, in large due to contact of swimming fins with the reef. In addition, benthic zone and branching corals, two categories to which D. hemprichi belongs, have an increased rate of recreational diving damage as compared with corals that inhabit deeper zones.

In an effort to decrease diving pressure on natural reefs, artificial reefs were constructed with D. hemprichi, sea urchins, and another coral species – Stylophora pistillata – to determine their ability to attract divers as well as to support the local fauna. Unlike its usual niche on vertical protrusions or on the top side of horizontal substrata, D. hemprichi has attached to the bottom surface of the horizontal plates that form the scaffold of the artificial reef. This is due to S. pistillata outcompeting D. hemprichi for the upper surface of the horizontal substrata, since the zooxanthellae of S. pistillata require light for photosynthesis whereas azooxanthellate D. hemprichi can exist without it. Therefore, by living on the bottom surface of horizontal substrata, D. hemprichi is able to avoid algal growth and sedimentation as well. The identification of optimal niches for D. hemprichi allows for future transplantation of coral to artificial reefs in order to remedy human impact.
