= Litophyton columnaris =

Scientific classification
- Kingdom: Animalia
- Phylum: Cnidaria
- Subphylum: Anthozoa
- Class: Octocorallia
- Order: Alcyonacea
- Family: Nephtheidae
- Genus: Litophyton
- Species: L. columnaris

Binomial name
- Litophyton columnaris (Studer, 1895)

Synonyms
- Nephthea columnaris Studer, 1895

Genus of coral

Litophyton columnaris is a genus of soft coral. It was first described by Théophile Rudolphe Studer in 1895.
