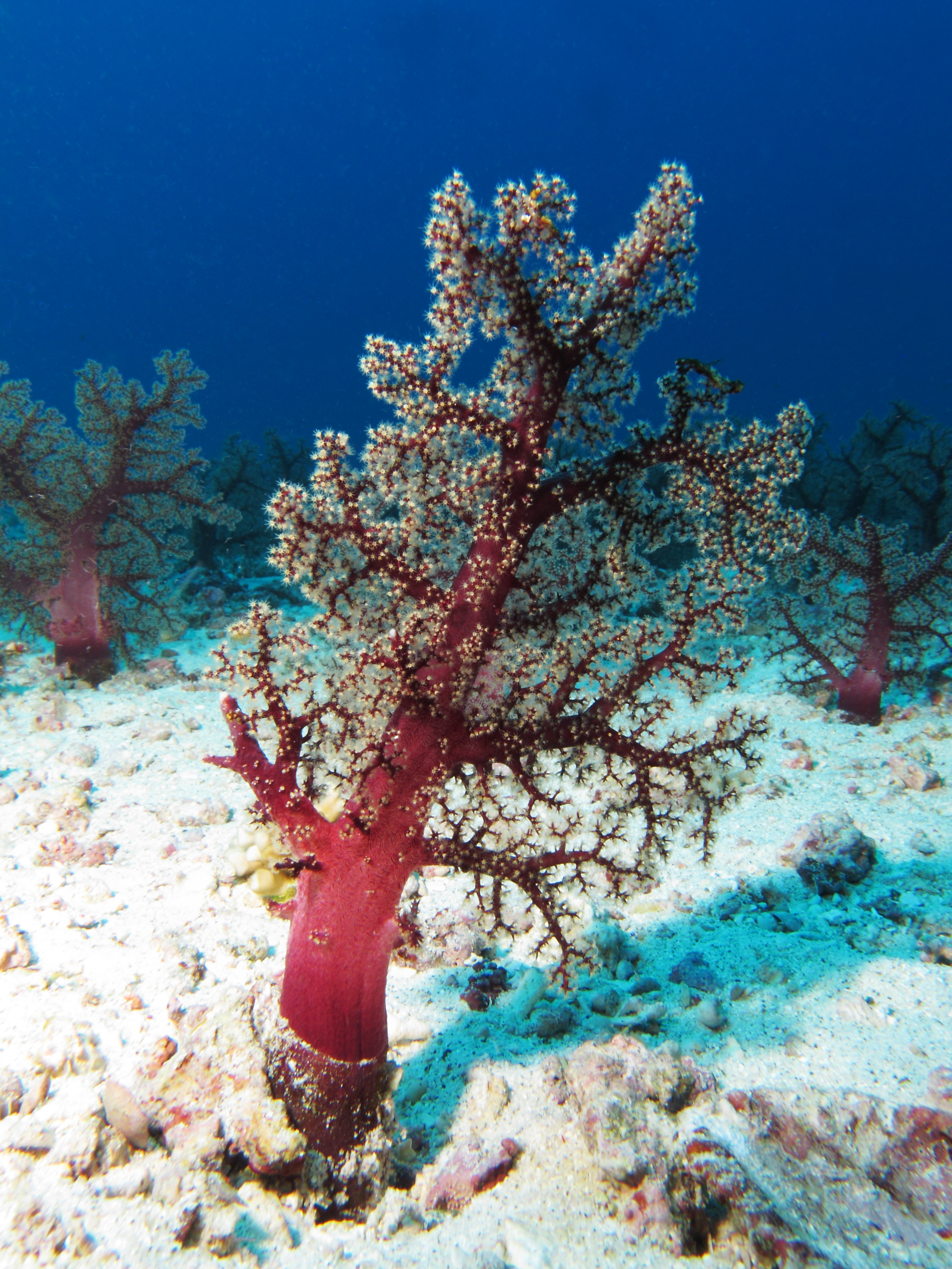
- Dendronephthya sp.

Scientific classification
- Kingdom: Animalia
- Phylum: Cnidaria
- Subphylum: Anthozoa
- Class: Octocorallia
- Order: Alcyonacea
- Family: Nephtheidae
- Genus: Dendronephthya; Kükenthal, 1905

Synonyms
- Spongodes

= Dendronephthya =

Genus of corals

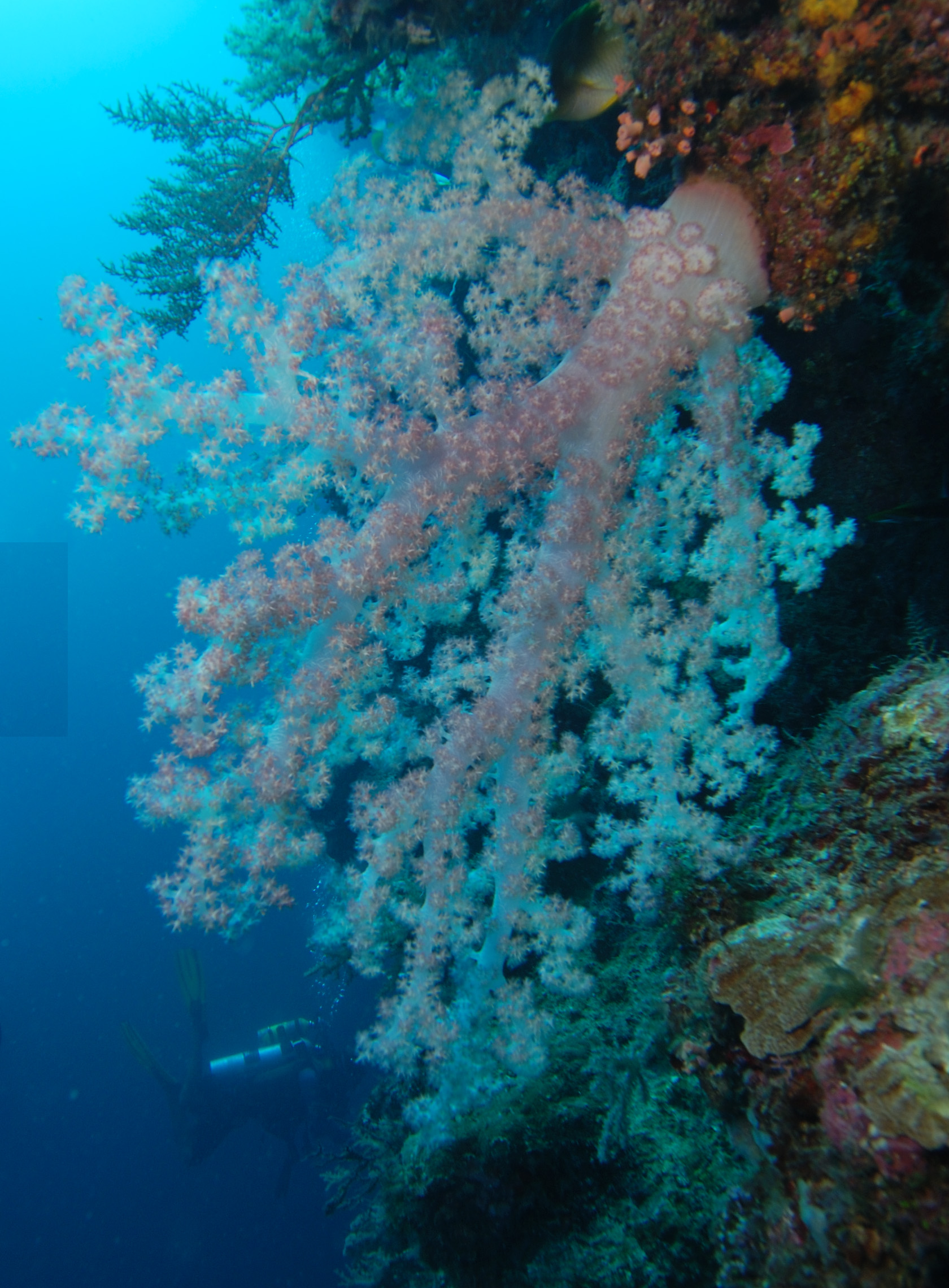
Dendronephthya sp.

Dendronephthya is a genus of soft corals in the family Nephtheidae. There are over 250 described species in this genus. They are sometimes kept in aquariums, but are notoriously difficult to keep, requiring a near constant supply of small foods such as phytoplankton.

== Species ==
- Dendronephthya acaulis Kükenthal, 1906
- Dendronephthya aculeata Kükenthal, 1905
- Dendronephthya agaricoides Henderson, 1909
- Dendronephthya alba Utinomi, 1952
- Dendronephthya albogilva Henderson, 1909
- Dendronephthya alcocki Thomson & Henderson, 1906
- Dendronephthya alexanderi Nutting, 1908
- Dendronephthya amaebisclera Thomson & Dean, 1931
- Dendronephthya ambigua Henderson, 1909
- Dendronephthya andamanensis Henderson, 1909
- Dendronephthya andersoni Henderson, 1909
- Dendronephthya anguina Wright & Studer, 1889
- Dendronephthya annectens Sherriffs, 1922
- Dendronephthya arakanensis Henderson, 1909
- Dendronephthya arborea May, 1899
- Dendronephthya arbuscula Henderson, 1909
- Dendronephthya argentea Kükenthal, 1905
- Dendronephthya armata Holm, 1895
- Dendronephthya armifer Thomson & Dean, 1931
- Dendronephthya aruensis Kükenthal, 1910
- Dendronephthya aspera Tixier-Durivault & Prevor, 1960
- Dendronephthya aurantiaca Thomson & Henderson, 1906
- Dendronephthya aurea Utinomi, 1952
- Dendronephthya aurora Ridley, 1887
- Dendronephthya australis Kükenthal, 1905
- Dendronephthya biformata Harrison, 1908
- Dendronephthya binongkoensis Verseveldt, 1966
- Dendronephthya boletiformis Ridley, 1887
- Dendronephthya bonnieri Verseveldt, 1960
- Dendronephthya booleyi Henderson, 1909
- Dendronephthya boschmai Verseveldt, 1966
- Dendronephthya brachycaulos Henderson, 1909
- Dendronephthya brevirama Burchardt, 1898
- Dendronephthya bruuni Verseveldt & van Ofwegen, 1991
- Dendronephthya caerula Kükenthal, 1905
- Dendronephthya candida Pütter, 1900
- Dendronephthya carnea Wright & Studer, 1889
- Dendronephthya castanea Utinomi, 1952
- Dendronephthya cervicornus Wright & Studer, 1889
- Dendronephthya chimnoi Harrison, 1908
- Dendronephthya cirsium Kükenthal, 1905
- Dendronephthya clara Tixier-Durivault & Prevor, 1960
- Dendronephthya clavata Kükenthal, 1905
- Dendronephthya cocosiensis Henderson, 1909
- Dendronephthya colemani Verseveldt, 1977
- Dendronephthya collaris Wright & Studer, 1889
- Dendronephthya colombiensis Henderson, 1909
- Dendronephthya composita Tixier-Durivault & Prevor, 1962
- Dendronephthya conica Henderson, 1909
- Dendronephthya coronata Wright & Studer, 1889
- Dendronephthya costatorubra Henderson, 1909
- Dendronephthya crassa Tixier-Durivault & Prevor, 1960
- Dendronephthya crosslandi Thomson & Henderson, 1906
- Dendronephthya crystallina Henderson, 1909
- Dendronephthya curvata Kükenthal, 1905
- Dendronephthya decipiens Henderson, 1909
- Dendronephthya decussatospinosa Utinomi, 1952
- Dendronephthya delicatissima Henderson, 1909
- Dendronephthya dendritica Utinomi, 1954
- Dendronephthya dendrophyta Wright & Studer, 1889
- Dendronephthya densa Kükenthal, 1906
- Dendronephthya depressa Kükenthal, 1895
- Dendronephthya devexa Tixier-Durivault & Prevor, 1960
- Dendronephthya dichotoma Henderson, 1909
- Dendronephthya disciformis Kükenthal, 1905
- Dendronephthya divaricata Gray, 1862
- Dendronephthya doederleini Kükenthal, 1905
- Dendronephthya dofleini Kükenthal, 1905
- Dendronephthya dollfusi Tixier-Durivault & Prevor, 1962
- Dendronephthya dromidicola Utinomi, 1952
- Dendronephthya eburnea Kükenthal, 1905
- Dendronephthya echinata Tixier-Durivault & Prevor, 1959
- Dendronephthya ehrenbergi Kükenthal, 1904
- Dendronephthya electa Tixier-Durivault & Prevor, 1962
- Dendronephthya elegans Harrison, 1908
- Dendronephthya elongata Henderson, 1909
- Dendronephthya erinacea Kükenthal, 1905
- Dendronephthya fallax Tixier-Durivault & Prevor, 1962
- Dendronephthya featherensis Verseveldt, 1977
- Dendronephthya filigrana Kükenthal, 1906
- Dendronephthya fischeri Tixier-Durivault & Prevor, 1960
- Dendronephthya flabellifera Studer, 1888
- Dendronephthya flammea Sherriffs, 1922
- Dendronephthya flava May, 1899
- Dendronephthya florida Esper, 1791
- Dendronephthya foliata Henderson, 1909
- Dendronephthya folifera Pütter, 1900
- Dendronephthya formosa Gravier, 1908
- Dendronephthya fragilis Tixier-Durivault & Prevor, 1960
- Dendronephthya furcata Utinomi, 1952
- Dendronephthya fusca Studer, 1894
- Dendronephthya ganjamensis Henderson, 1909
- Dendronephthya gardineri Thomson & Mackinnon, 1909
- Dendronephthya gigantea Verrill, 1864
- Dendronephthya gilva Henderson, 1909
- Dendronephthya gloriosa Utinomi, 1952
- Dendronephthya golgotha Utinomi, 1952
- Dendronephthya gracillima Kükenthal, 1905
- Dendronephthya grandiflora Henderson, 1909
- Dendronephthya gravieri Kükenthal, 1910
- Dendronephthya gregoriensis Henderson, 1909
- Dendronephthya griffini Roxas, 1933
- Dendronephthya guggenheimi Roxas, 1933
- Dendronephthya habereri Kükenthal, 1905
- Dendronephthya hadzii Tixier-Durivault & Prevor, 1959
- Dendronephthya halterosclera Thomson & Dean, 1931
- Dendronephthya harrisoni Henderson, 1909
- Dendronephthya hartmeyeri Kükenthal, 1903
- Dendronephthya hemprichi Klunzinger, 1877
- Dendronephthya heterocyathus Wright & Studer, 1889
- Dendronephthya hicksoni Kükenthal, 1905
- Dendronephthya hirsuta Tixier-Durivault & Prevor, 1960
- Dendronephthya hyalina Kükenthal, 1905
- Dendronephthya hystricosa Verseveldt & van Ofwegen, 1991
- Dendronephthya inconfusa Tixier-Durivault & Prevor, 1962
- Dendronephthya inermis Henderson, 1909
- Dendronephthya inhacaensis Verseveldt, 1960
- Dendronephthya investigata Tixier-Durivault & Prevor, 1962
- Dendronephthya involuta Kükenthal, 1895
- Dendronephthya irregularis Henderson, 1909
- Dendronephthya japonica Kükenthal, 1905
- Dendronephthya jucunda Tixier-Durivault & Prevor, 1960
- Dendronephthya klunzingeri Studer, 1888
- Dendronephthya koellikeri Kükenthal, 1905
- Dendronephthya kukenthali Gravier, 1908
- Dendronephthya kukenthali Thomson & Henderson, 1906
- Dendronephthya lanxifera Holm, 1895
- Dendronephthya latipes Tixier-Durivault & Prevor, 1960
- Dendronephthya laxa Wright & Studer, 1889
- Dendronephthya lokobeensis Verseveldt
- Dendronephthya longicaulis Kükenthal, 1905
- Dendronephthya longispina Henderson, 1909
- Dendronephthya lutea Kükenthal, 1905
- Dendronephthya macrocaulis Henderson, 1909
- Dendronephthya macrospina Wright & Studer, 1889
- Dendronephthya magna Tixier-Durivault & Prevor, 1960
- Dendronephthya magnacantha Nutting, 1912
- Dendronephthya malabarensis Henderson, 1909
- Dendronephthya malaya Roxas, 1933
- Dendronephthya manyanensis Roxas, 1933
- Dendronephthya marenzelleri Kükenthal, 1905
- Dendronephthya masoni Henderson, 1909
- Dendronephthya maxima Kükenthal, 1905
- Dendronephthya mayi Kükenthal, 1904
- Dendronephthya merguiensis Henderson, 1909
- Dendronephthya mertoni Kükenthal, 1910
- Dendronephthya mexicana Kükenthal, 1905
- Dendronephthya michaelseni Kükenthal, 1910
- Dendronephthya microspiculata Pütter, 1900
- Dendronephthya minima Verseveldt, 1966
- Dendronephthya mirabilis Tixier-Durivault & Prevorsek, 1962
- Dendronephthya miriabilis Henderson, 1909
- Dendronephthya mirifica Tixier-Durivault, 1972
- Dendronephthya mollis Holm, 1895
- Dendronephthya monticulosa Wright & Studer, 1889
- Dendronephthya mortenseni Tixier-Durivault & Prevor, 1959
- Dendronephthya moseri Roxas, 1933
- Dendronephthya mucronata Pütter, 1900
- Dendronephthya multispinosa Henderson, 1909
- Dendronephthya mutabilis Tixier-Durivault & Prevor, 1962
- Dendronephthya natalensis Tixier-Durivault & Prevor, 1960
- Dendronephthya nicobarensis Henderson, 1909
- Dendronephthya nigrescens Kükenthal, 1905
- Dendronephthya nigripes Nutting, 1912
- Dendronephthya nigrotincta Ridley, 1887
- Dendronephthya nipponica Utinomi, 1952
- Dendronephthya noumeensis Verseveldt, 1974
- Dendronephthya novaezeelandiae Kükenthal, 1905
- Dendronephthya obtusa Henderson, 1909
- Dendronephthya ochracea Henderson, 1909
- Dendronephthya orientalis Henderson, 1909
- Dendronephthya ovata Henderson, 1909
- Dendronephthya oviformis Nutting, 1912
- Dendronephthya padavensis Henderson, 1909
- Dendronephthya palaoensis Utinomi, 1952
- Dendronephthya pallida Henderson, 1909
- Dendronephthya palmata Utinomi, 1952
- Dendronephthya parvula Henderson, 1909
- Dendronephthya pectinata Holm, 1895
- Dendronephthya pectinata Song, 1976
- Dendronephthya pellucida Henderson, 1909
- Dendronephthya pentagona Henderson, 1909
- Dendronephthya persica Henderson, 1909
- Dendronephthya pharonis Thomson & McQueen, 1911
- Dendronephthya planoregularis Burchardt, 1898
- Dendronephthya puetteri Kükenthal, 1905
- Dendronephthya pulchella Utinomi, 1952
- Dendronephthya pulchra Thomson & Henderson, 1905
- Dendronephthya pumilio Studer, 1888
- Dendronephthya punctata Kükenthal, 1906
- Dendronephthya punicea Studer, 1888
- Dendronephthya purpurea Henderson, 1909
- Dendronephthya pustulosa Wright & Studer, 1889
- Dendronephthya pyriformis Verseveldt & van Ofwegen, 1991
- Dendronephthya quadrata Henderson, 1909
- Dendronephthya querciformis Kükenthal, 1906
- Dendronephthya radiata Kükenthal, 1905
- Dendronephthya ramulosa Gray, 1862
- Dendronephthya regia Verseveldt, 1968
- Dendronephthya repens Kükenthal, 1905
- Dendronephthya reticulata Thomson & Dean, 1931
- Dendronephthya revelata Tixier-Durivault & Prevor, 1962
- Dendronephthya rigida Studer, 1888
- Dendronephthya robusta Kükenthal, 1895
- Dendronephthya roemeri Kükenthal, 1911
- Dendronephthya rosamondae Boone, 1938
- Dendronephthya rosea Kükenthal, 1895
- Dendronephthya rubeola Henderson, 1909
- Dendronephthya rubescens Harrison, 1908
- Dendronephthya rubescens Thomson & Dean, 1931
- Dendronephthya rubra May, 1899
- Dendronephthya savignyi Ehrenberg, 1843
- Dendronephthya semperi Studer, 1888
- Dendronephthya simplex Sherriffs, 1922
- Dendronephthya sinaiensis Verseveldt, 1971
- Dendronephthya sinensis Pütter, 1900
- Dendronephthya snelliusi Verseveldt, 1966
- Dendronephthya speciosa Kükenthal, 1905
- Dendronephthya spinifera Holm, 1895
- Dendronephthya spinosa Gray, 1862
- Dendronephthya spinulosa Gray, 1862
- Dendronephthya spissa Tixier-Durivault & Prevor, 1962
- Dendronephthya spongiosa Tixier-Durivault & Prevor, 1959
- Dendronephthya staphyloidea Verseveldt & van Ofwegen, 1991
- Dendronephthya stockci Verseveldt, 1968
- Dendronephthya stolonifera May, 1899
- Dendronephthya studeri Ridley, 1884
- Dendronephthya suensoni Holm, 1895
- Dendronephthya suesiana Thomson & McQueen, 1908
- Dendronephthya suluensis Verseveldt, 1966
- Dendronephthya surugaensis Imahara, 1977
- Dendronephthya tabaensis Verseveldt & Cohen, 1971
- Dendronephthya tenera Holm, 1895
- Dendronephthya tenuis Tixier-Durivault & Prevor, 1960
- Dendronephthya thomsoni Harrison, 1908
- Dendronephthya thuja Henderson, 1909
- Dendronephthya tixierae d'Hondt, 1977
- Dendronephthya translucens Henderson, 1909
- Dendronephthya tripartita Henderson, 1909
- Dendronephthya tuberculata Utinomi, 1952
- Dendronephthya uliginosa Thomson & Henderson, 1906
- Dendronephthya umbellata Wright & Studer, 1889
- Dendronephthya utinomii Tixier-Durivault & Prevor, 1959
- Dendronephthya variata Henderson, 1909
- Dendronephthya varicolor Henderson, 1909
- Dendronephthya vervoorti Verseveldt & van Ofwegen, 1991
- Dendronephthya villosa Kükenthal, 1905
- Dendronephthya waitei Thomson & Mackinnon, 1911
- Dendronephthya weberi Verseveldt, 1966
- Dendronephthya wijsmanae Verseveldt, 1974
- Dendronephthya yamamotoi Utinomi, 1954
- Dendronephthya zanzibarensis Thomson & Henderson, 1906
