= Carl Benjamin Klunzinger =

German physician and zoologist

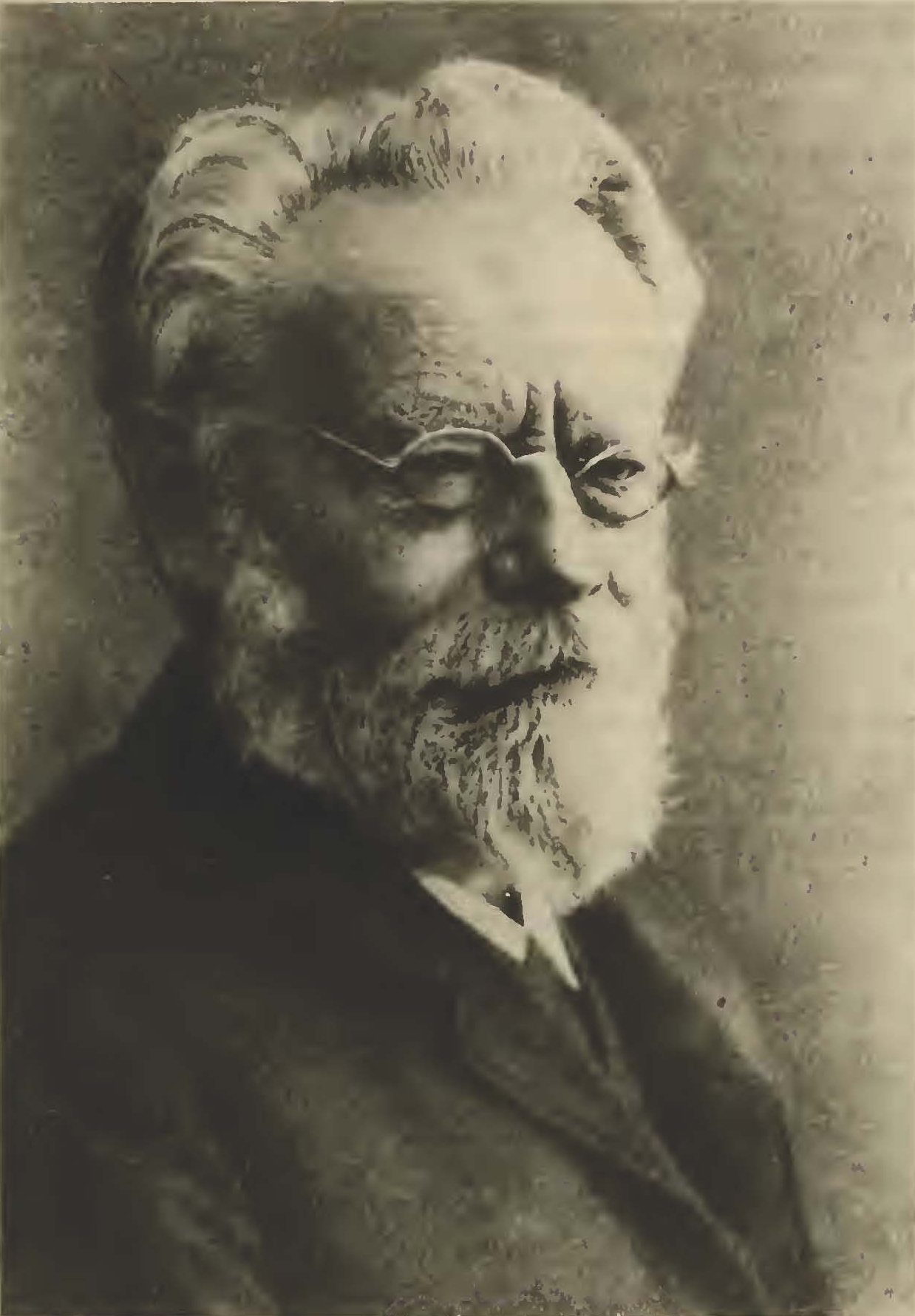
Carl Benjamin Klunzinger

Carl Benjamin Klunzinger (18 November 1834, in Güglingen – 21 June 1914, in Stuttgart) was a German physician and zoologist.

He studied medicine at the Universities of Tübingen and Würzburg, afterwards attending lectures on geology and zoology in Vienna and Prague. In 1862 he traveled to Cairo, where he spent eighteen months learning Arabic. Beginning in February 1864 he worked as a physician at Kosseir, a seaport on the Red Sea. Here he spent five years collecting a vast quantity of fish and other marine specimens.

From 1869 he examined his Red Sea collection at the Staatliches Museum für Naturkunde Stuttgart, traveling to Frankfurt and Berlin in order to conduct zoological comparison studies. At Stuttgart he also investigated Australian fish species procured by Ferdinand von Mueller (1825-1896), from whose collection Klunzinger described approximately fifty new species from Australia and New Zealand. In 1872 he was back in Kosseir collecting additional marine specimens, later returning to Stuttgart (1875), where in 1884 he was appointed professor of zoology at the University of Stuttgart.

== Legacy ==
His name is associated with a number of zoological species, such as:

- The fish Klunzinger's sweeper Pempheris klunzingeri, McCulloch, 1911
- The Ponyfish Equulites klunzingeri (Steindachner, 1898), *
- The soft Coral Cladiella klunzingeri Thomson & Simpson, 1909,
- The soft Coral Dendronephthya klunzingeri (Studer, 1888),
- The western carp gudgeon Hypseleotris klunzingeri (J. D. Ogilby, 1898), and
- The sea urchin crab Echinoecus klunzingeri (A. Milne-Edwards, 1879).

== Selected writings ==
- Synopsis der Fische des Rothen Meeres, 1870 - Synopsis of fishes from the Red Sea
- Die Korallthiere des Rothen Meeres, 1877-1879 - Coral animals of the Red Sea
- Bilder aus Oberägyten, der Wuste und dem Rothen Meere, 1877 - Images of Upper Egypt, the desert and the Red Sea.
- Die v. Muellersche Sammlung australischer Fische in Stuttgart, 1879 - Müller's collection of Australian fish in Stuttgart.
- Die Rundkrabben (Cyclometopa) des Roten Meeres, 1913.
