= Coronephthya =

Scientific classification
- Kingdom: Animalia
- Phylum: Cnidaria
- Subphylum: Anthozoa
- Class: Octocorallia
- Order: Malacalcyonacea
- Family: Nephtheidae
- Genus: Coronephthya; Utinomi, 1966
- Species: C. macrospiculata

Binomial name
- Coronephthya macrospiculata (Thomson & Mackinnon, 1910)

Genus of corals

Coronephthya is a monotypic genus of corals belonging to the family Nephtheidae. The only species is Coronephthya macrospiculata.

The species is found in near Eastern Australia.
