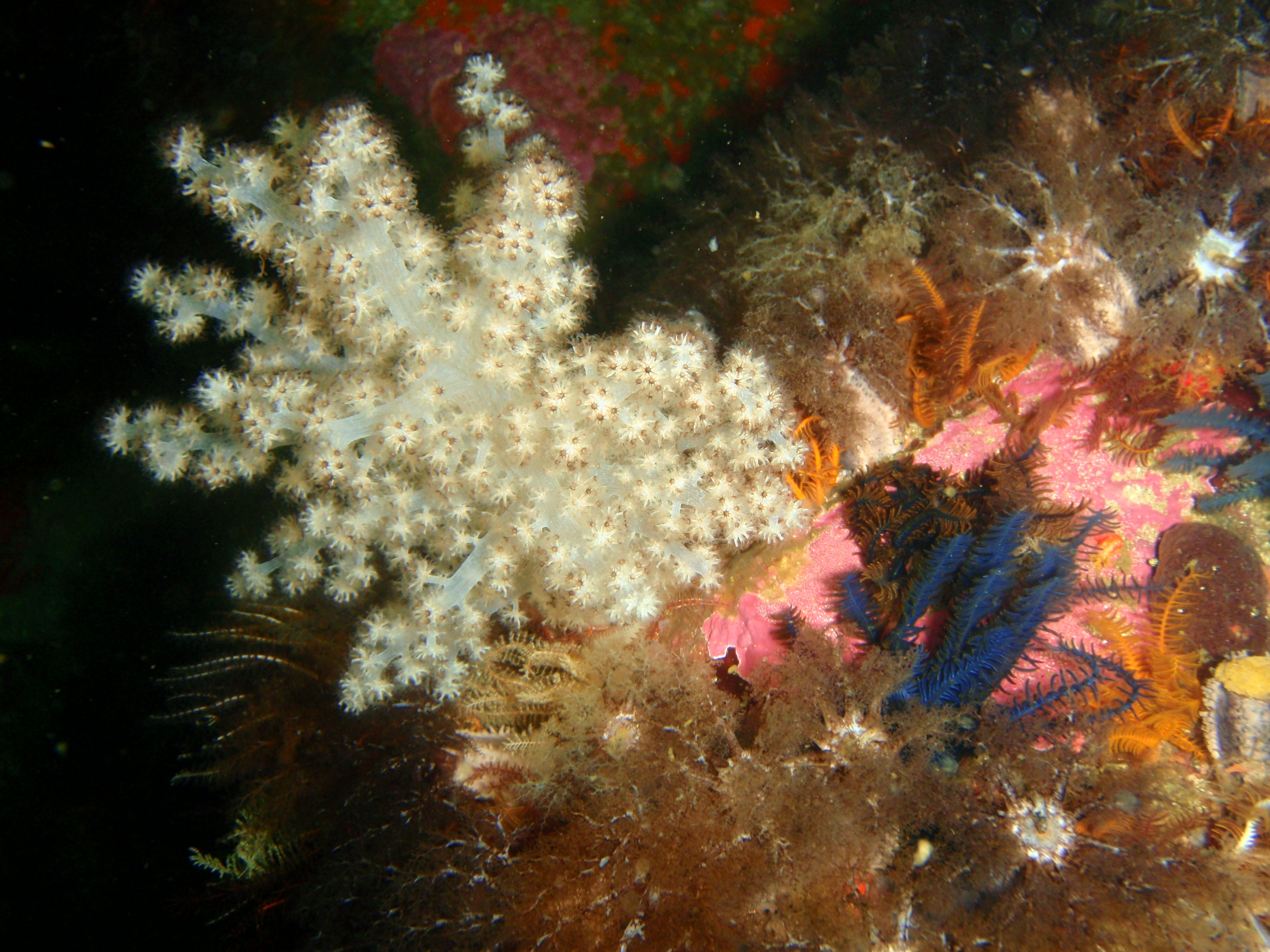
- Capnella thyrsoidea

Scientific classification
- Kingdom: Animalia
- Phylum: Cnidaria
- Subphylum: Anthozoa
- Class: Octocorallia
- Order: Malacalcyonacea
- Family: Capnellidae
- Genus: Capnella; J. E. Gray, 1869

= Capnella =

Genus of corals

Capnella is a genus of soft corals in the family Nephtheidae. They are also commonly known as Kenya tree corals.

== Species ==
- Capnella arbuscula Verseveldt, 1977
- Capnella australiensis (Thorpe, 1928)
- Capnella bouilloni Verseveldt, 1976
- Capnella erecta Verseveldt, 1977
- Capnella fructosa
- Capnella fungiformis Kükenthal, 1903
- Capnella gaboensis Verseveldt, 1977
- Capnella garetti Verseveldt, 1977
- Capnella imbricata (Quoy & Gaimard, 1833)
- Capnella johnstonei Verseveldt, 1977
- Capnella lacertiliensis Macfadyen
- Capnella parva Light, 1913
- Capnella portlandensis Verseveldt, 1977
- Capnella ramosa Light, 1913
- Capnella sabangensis Roxas, 1933
- Capnella shepherdi Verseveldt, 1977
- Capnella spicata (May)
- Capnella susanae Williams, 1988
- Capnella thyrsoidea (Verrill, 1989)
- Capnella watsonae Verseveldt, 1977

== Description ==
Capnella are arborescent, some species are lobed. Generally they are grey with brown polyps. Colour intensity is dependent on light intensity, the higher the intensity of light, the lighter colour of the coral. They form thick trunks with branches that closely resemble trees. In stronger currents they form flatter colonies with shorter branches.

== Distribution and habitats ==
Kenya Tree corals are widespread throughout the Indo-pacific region, from the African coast to the Western Pacific. They are found on coral reef slopes in clear water from deep to the shallows with strong tidal currents. Sometimes found in shadier places and on coral rubble in shallow water close to the shore.

== Biology ==
They have symbiotic algae from which they obtain most of their nutrients.

Asexual reproduction has been observed. They form distinctive swellings at bottom of a branch which then drops off by fission at the swelling. The branch then secures to a new hold and forms a new colony. They can stick very quickly and will be firmly rooted within a day. Colonies can bend and reattach to the rock or by “creeping” and division at the base.
