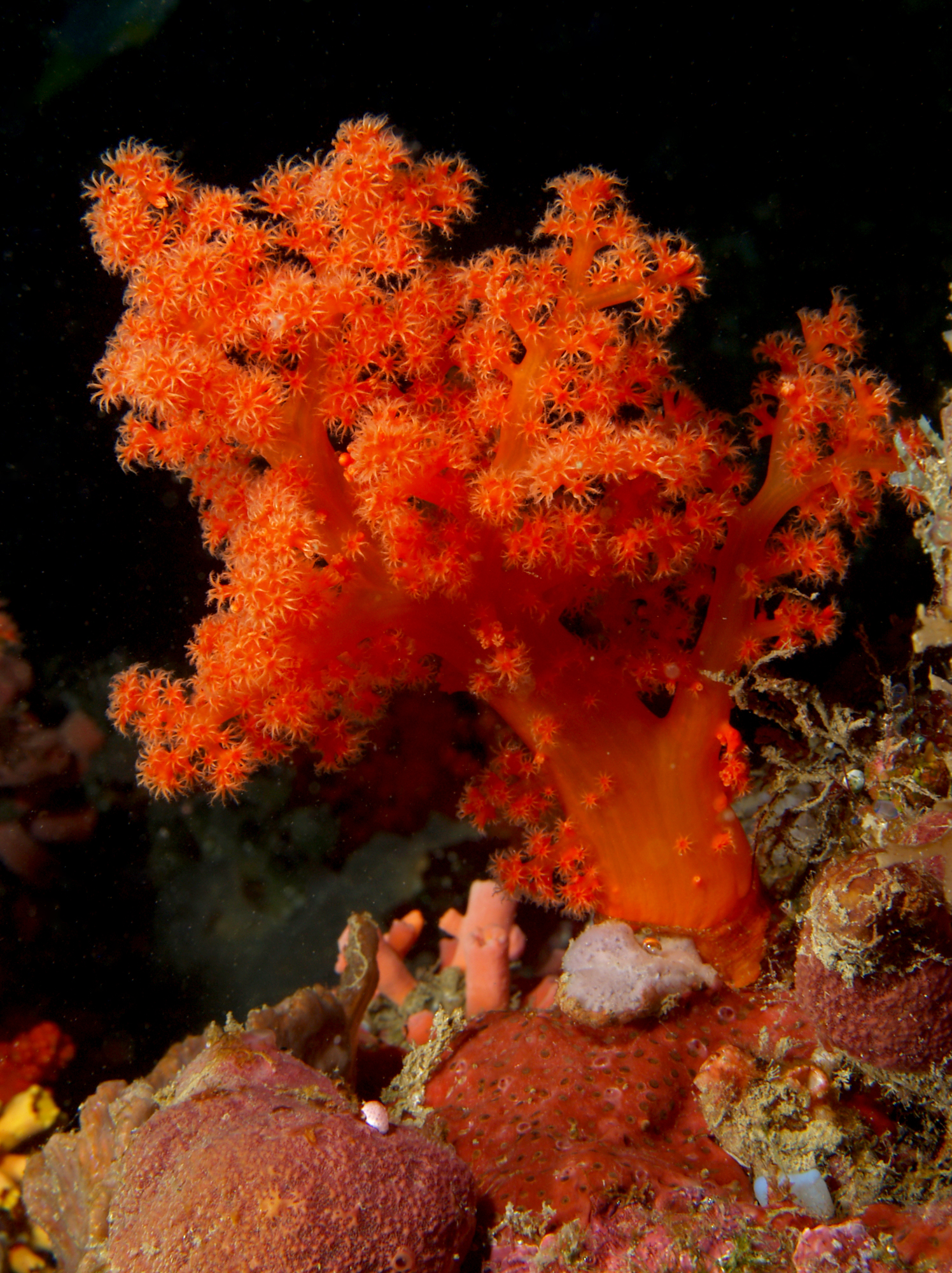

Scientific classification
- Domain: Eukaryota
- Kingdom: Animalia
- Phylum: Cnidaria
- Subphylum: Anthozoa
- Class: Octocorallia
- Order: Alcyonacea
- Family: Nephtheidae
- Genus: Scleronephthya; Studer, 1887

= Scleronephthya =

Genus of corals

Scleronephthya is a genus of corals belonging to the family Nephtheidae.

The species of this genus are found in Southeastern Asia, Australia.

Species:

- Paraspongodes candida (Koren & Danielssen, 1883)
- Paraspongodes islandica (Danielssen, 1887)
- Paraspongodes sarsii May, 1899
- Scleronephthya corymbosa Verseveldt & Cohen, 1971
- Scleronephthya crassa (Kükenthal, 1906)
- Scleronephthya flexilis Thomson & Simpson, 1909
- Scleronephthya gracillimum (Kükenthal, 1906)
- Scleronephthya lewinsohni Verseveldt & Benayahu, 1978
- Scleronephthya pallida (Whitelegge, 1897)
- Scleronephthya pustulosa Wright & Studer, 1889
- Scleronephthya spiculosa (Kükenthal, 1906)
