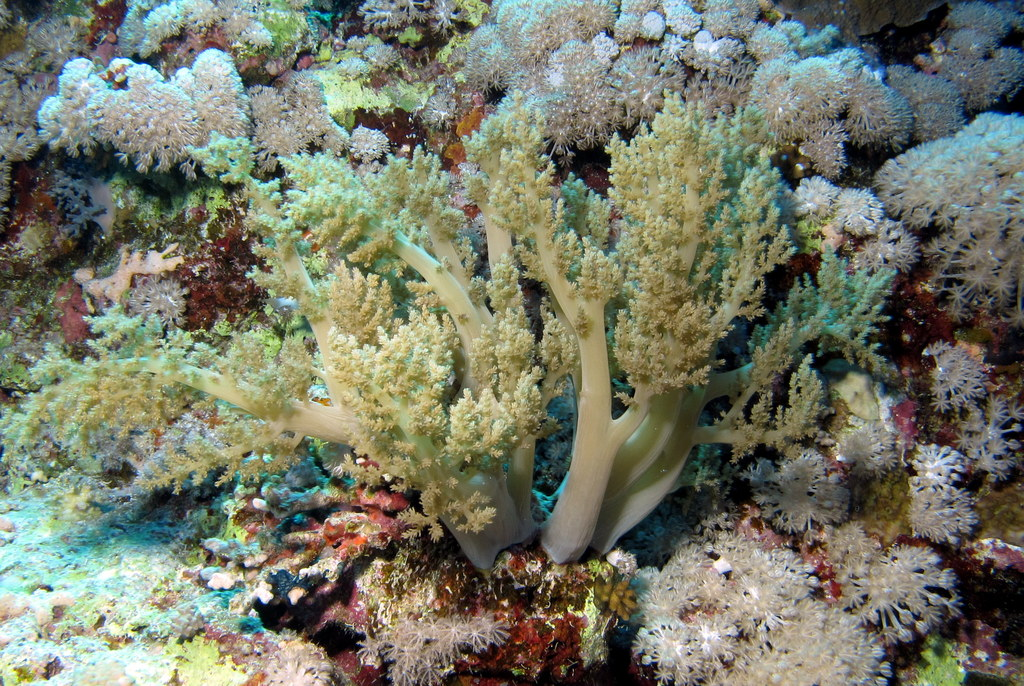

Scientific classification
- Kingdom: Animalia
- Phylum: Cnidaria
- Subphylum: Anthozoa
- Class: Octocorallia
- Order: Malacalcyonacea
- Family: Nephtheidae
- Genus: Litophyton
- Species: L. arboreum

Binomial name
- Litophyton arboreum Forskal, 1775

= Litophyton arboreum =

Species of coral

Litophyton arboreum, also known as broccoli coral, is a common soft coral (octocoral) found from the Red Sea to the Western Pacific. It grows up to 80 cm, usually on seaward reef slopes or hard bottoms. The color of L. arboreum varies from pale olive-green to yellow or grey. L. arboreum are anthozoans in the order Alcyonacea in the family Nephtheidae. The L. arboreum was originally classified in 1775 by Peter Forsskål, a Swedish Linnaean naturalist. As of 2016, the entire genus Litophyton was reclassified using phylogenetic data, in contrast to its original morphological classification.

== Ecology ==
L. arboreum is commonly found in the Red Sea. A 1997 reef transect study showed that octocorals, such as L. arboreum, compose under 20% of soft coral coverage on both reef flats, and the upper fore-reefs in the Gulf of Umm al-Rashrash, off the East coast of the Sinai Peninsula. Typically in Gulf of Umm al-Rashrash reefs, octocoral coverage is dominated by carpets of a few species. A possible explanation for this extensive, monospecific coverage is periods of rapid growth. L. arboreum is not typically one of these dominant octocorals, but can compose up to 36% of living soft coral coverage, as seen in the Gulf of Umm al-Rashrash Nature Reserve. In other Red Sea locations, L. arboreum composes as little as 3% of soft coral coverage, such as in the South and Center Muqebla regions.

As observed in other species of corals, space for settlement on the reef is one of the most important limiting factors for new colonies of L. arboreum. Similarly, physical factors—such as wave action, temperature variation, salinity and light– and biological factors– such as competition, predation, and disease– limit the success and prevalence of L. arboreum. Specifically, predation and competition for space may disrupt continuous community development for some species of Red Sea soft corals, resulting in patchy, discontinuous, communities spread across the reef. However, the coexistence of stony corals, soft corals, and algae in the Gulf of Umm al-Rashrash suggests that no one component has a distinct competitive dominance on the reef; instead, spatial variation results in different species exhibiting competitive dominance in different locations based on their unique ecological niches. At present, the intra- and interspecific competitive hierarchy of L. arboreum is unknown.

In other Red Sea locations, such as the Gulf of Aqaba off the Jordanian coast, L. arboreum is found in well developed reefs. The Aqaba reefs are unique to other coastal reefs due to their lack of spur and groove patterns on the fore-reef. Spur and groove formations are most likely absent due to the relatively calm waters of the Gulf of Aqaba; the lack of major wind and wave action eliminates the force required. The Gulf of Aqaba reefs are biogenic in origin, like the majority of reefs globally, and well developed on capes. The developed capes are distinct, and separated by sandy embayments that correspond to past dried river beds. As in other coastal reefs, the Aqaba reefs are fringed by shallow bays containing beds of seagrass, which lead into the reefs. The reefs themselves have wide, built, coral formations abundant at a depth of 20m, and reef flats most abundant at 60m. The spatial distribution of the corals present in the Aqaba community suggest ecological succession– driven primarily by geologic and ecological forces– is responsible for the topography of the reef. The existing Aqaba reefs are highly diverse, though future reef expansion is limited by steep shelf inclines, and any major expansion is highly unlikely given the benthic topography of the existing reefs.

== Symbiosis and reproduction ==
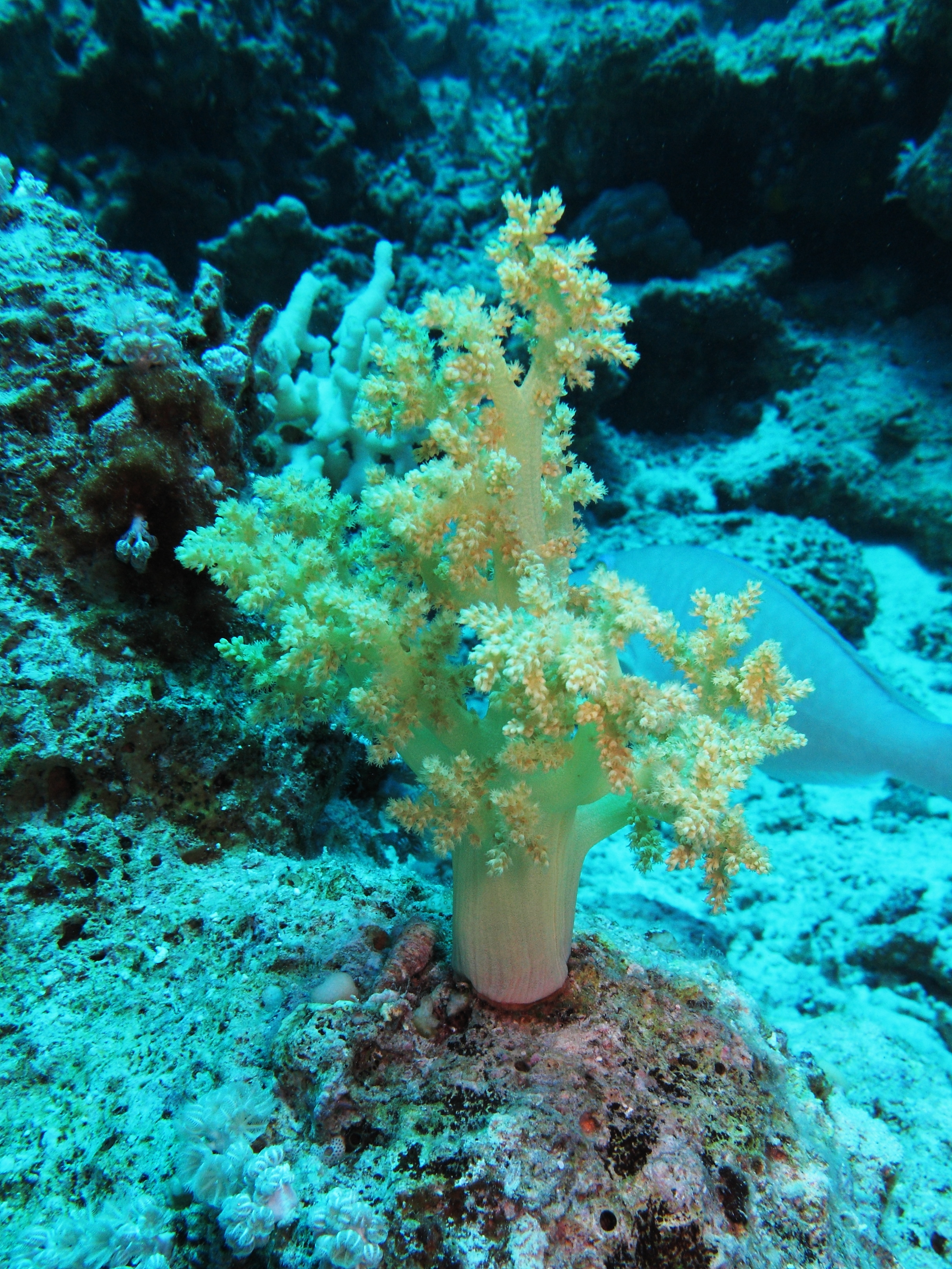
L. arboreum (Red Sea, Egypt)

The reproductive mechanisms of L. arboreum have been extensively studied, and offer a unique insight into anthozoa reproduction– particularly in regard to the uptake of Symbiodinium. L. arboreum, like other corals, have a relationship with an endosymbiotic dinoflagellate. Often referred to as zooxanthellae, the genus Symbiodinium is a point of extensive research, and its relationship with corals remains largely enigmatic.

In a 1992 study, researchers found that in L. arboreum spawning events, gametes released for fertilization were already associated with Symbiodinium. Such an observation suggests that the Symbiodinium were incorporated into the gametes, the oocytes, during oogenesis– the cellular division process yielding haploid oocytes.

There are two primary strategies of Symbiodinium uptake by anthozoans. Individuals can either take Symbiodinium from the maternal colony, or they can uptake new Symbiodinium from the surrounding environment. In situations of environmental uptake, zooplankton can act as an intermediary, transferring the Symbiodinium from the surrounding water column, to the daughter colony. The vast majority of scleractinian, or CaCO₃ reef-building corals, lack Symbiodinium in their broadcast gametes, indicating that the daughter coral are reliant on the surrounding environment to acquire Symbiodinium. Some species of octocorals– such as L. arboreum–have indicated an uptake strategy of maternal transfer.

L. arboreumis a gonochoric planulae brooder, meaning that individual coral colonies have separate sexes, and reproduction is dependent on spawning events in which gametes are broadcast into the surrounding water for fertilization, creating genetically distinct individuals which develop into new colonies. L. arboreum undergoes oogenesis cyclically, biannually, and has a highly specialized mechanism of symbiont uptake indicative of obligate mutualism and coevolution between the Symbiodinium and the L. arboreum. During oogenesis, Symbiodinium found in the adjacent gastrovascular cavity of the parent L. arboreum are incorporated into the haploid daughter cells of the oocytes. Stud-like cellular features on the exterior of epidermal cells that link together individual cells to form a cellular matrix– similar to the bumps on legos, or the hooks in velcro, and resemblant of hemidesmosomes– and link together the gastrodermal cells, locking into place the receptive cells and making Symbiodinium transfer possible. While in place, gaps open in the mesoglea tissue beneath the follicular cells, and the parent Symbiodinium, present in the vacuoles of follicular and gastrodermal cells, move through the mesogleal gaps and are up-taken by microvilli on the undeveloped oocyte prior to the completion of oogenesis. Once uptaken by the oocytes, the Symbiodinium are then covered with a thin layer of cells, later followed by a thicker follicular layer composed of gastrodermal cells from the maternal colony. Following symbion uptake, the gaps close, leaving a single, continuous mesoglea. Evidence suggests that symbions that are unsuccessfully uptaken– either rejected by the oocyte, or that die after uptake– are consumed and used as nutrients by the daughter cell. In summary, Symbiodinium stored in the maternal colony are inserted into reproductive cells before they are broadcast into the environment, yielding haploid cells associated with Symbiodinium before fertilization. This strategy of maternal symbion transfer may lead to more successful colonization; individuals have a higher chance of survival if new colonies do not need to establish their own symbiosis.

Historically, this maternal symbiont transfer is of great significance, because it is the first indication of cell-bound Symbiodinium found in the vacuoles of parent cells not being exclusively used for symbiosis. Further, L. arboreum is one of very few corals that has recorded evidence of maternal Symbiodinium transfer, offering a unique insight into the complex world of coral reproduction.

== Medical applications ==
Like many other reef-dwelling organisms, L. arboreumhas applications in the medical field, many of which are unknown. A 2006 study showed that 83% of Red Sea Alcyonacean corals exhibited antimicrobial activity against a variety of marine bacteria found in the surrounding environment. As a means of combating microbial attacks, Red Sea Alcyonacean corals use antibiotic compounds as a chemical defense. A 2018 study specifically on L. arboreum was able to find and isolate a pseudoguaiane-type sesquiterpene compound, an organic molecule, litopharbol, which exhibits both antimicrobial and anticancer activity, and has direct applications to medicine.
