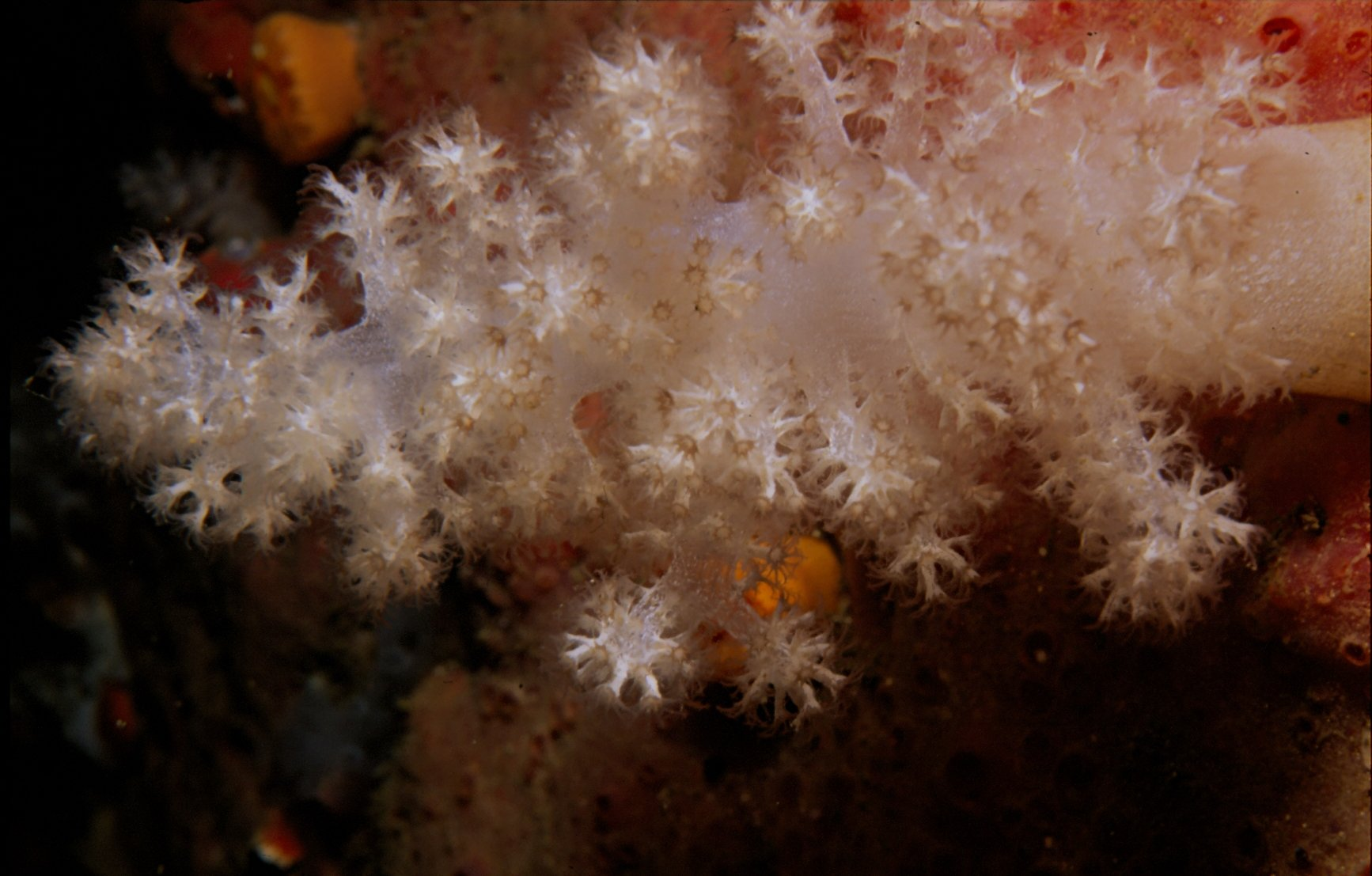
- cauliflower soft coral

Scientific classification
- Kingdom: Animalia
- Phylum: Cnidaria
- Subphylum: Anthozoa
- Class: Octocorallia
- Order: Malacalcyonacea
- Family: Capnellidae
- Genus: Eunephthya; Verrill, 1869

= Eunephthya =

Genus of corals

Eunephthya is a genus of soft corals in the family Capnellidae. The genus is only known from South Africa

== Species ==
- Eunephthya celata McFadden & van Ofwegen, 2012
- Eunephthya ericius McFadden & van Ofwegen, 2012
- Eunephthya granulata McFadden & van Ofwegen, 2012
- Eunephthya shirleyae McFadden & van Ofwegen, 2012
- Eunephthya susanae (Williams, 1988)
- Eunephthya thyrsoidea Verrill, 1869
