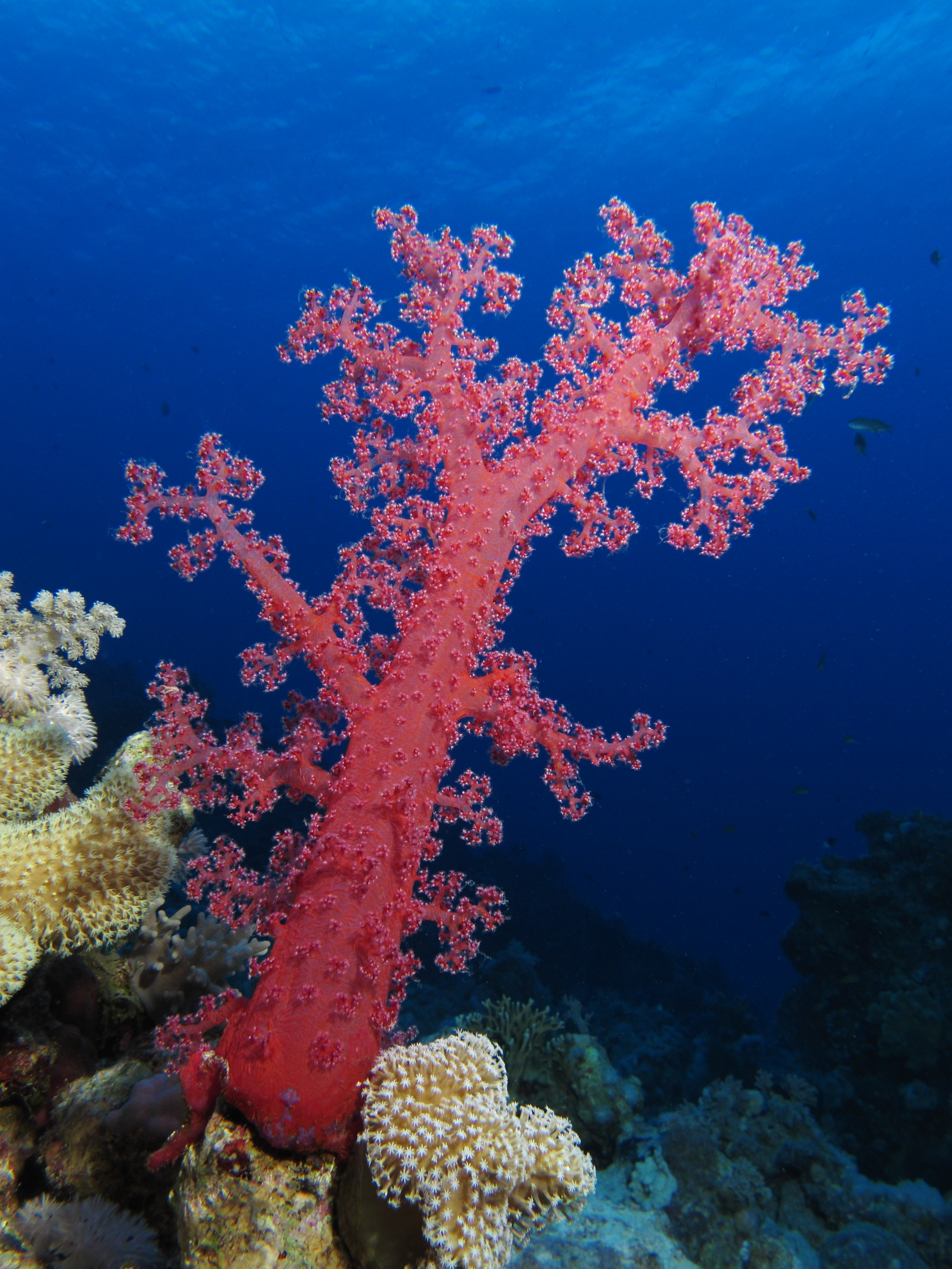

Scientific classification
- Kingdom: Animalia
- Phylum: Cnidaria
- Subphylum: Anthozoa
- Class: Octocorallia
- Order: Malacalcyonacea
- Family: Nephtheidae
- Genus: Dendronephthya
- Species: D. klunzingeri

Binomial name
- Dendronephthya klunzingeri (Studer, 1888)

= Dendronephthya klunzingeri =

Species of coral

Dendronephthya klunzingeri is a species of soft coral in the family Nephtheidae.

This species is divaricate with discontinuous contours. Each bundle has 10 to 12 polyps. The branching lobes have sizable bunches.
