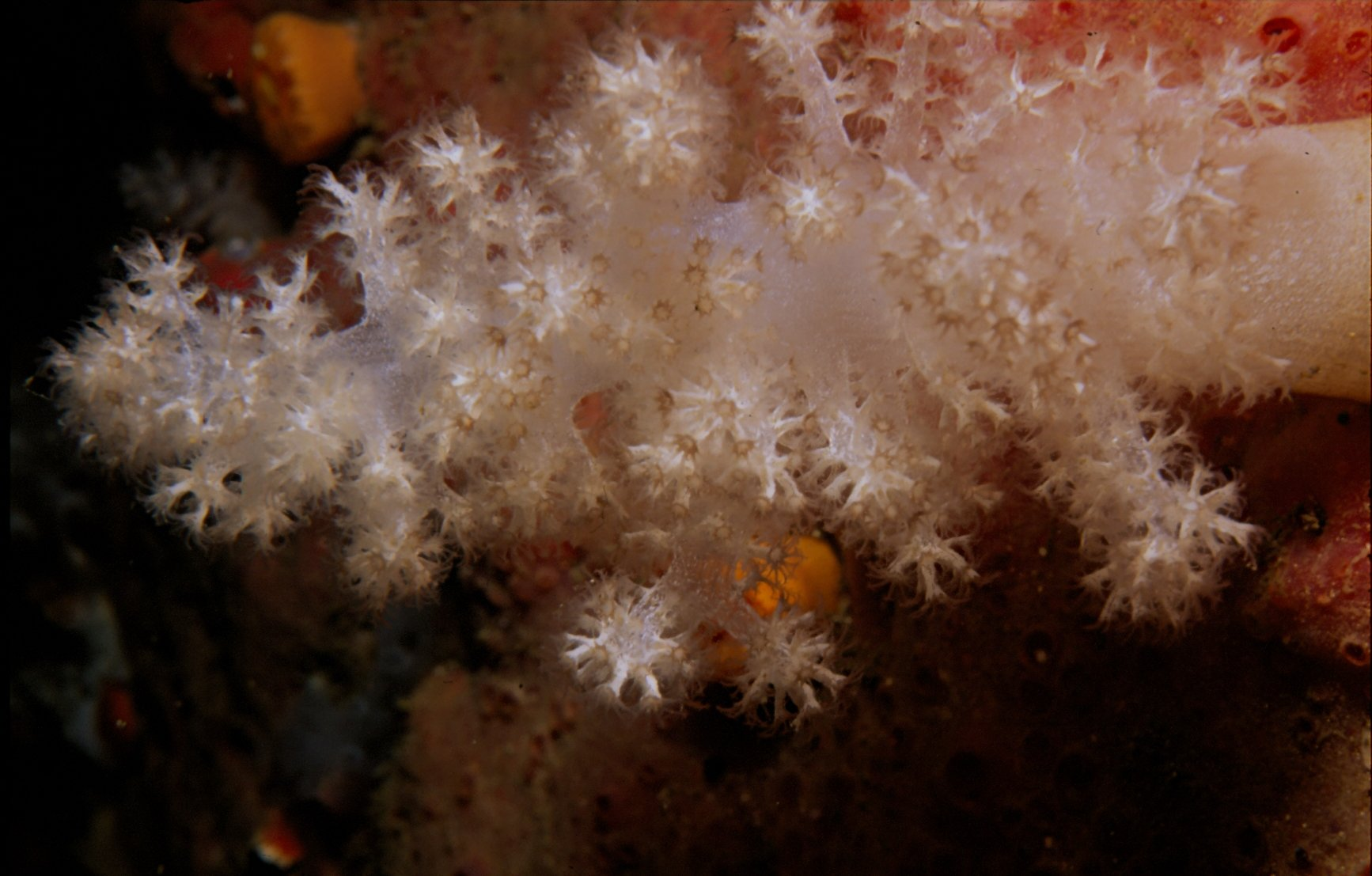

Scientific classification
- Kingdom: Animalia
- Phylum: Cnidaria
- Subphylum: Anthozoa
- Class: Octocorallia
- Order: Malacalcyonacea
- Family: Capnellidae
- Genus: Eunephthya
- Species: E. thyrsoidea

Binomial name
- Eunephthya thyrsoidea Verrill, 1869

= Cauliflower soft coral =

Species of coral

The cauliflower soft coral (Eunephthya thyrsoidea) is a species of colonial soft coral in the family Capnellidae.

== Description ==
Cauliflower soft corals grow in colonies of up to 30 centimeters in height. The polyps are 0.2 cm in diameter. It grows as a large whitish colony with side branches ending in bunches of grey- or brown-tinged polyps.

== Distribution ==
This species is known from the Cape Peninsula to northern KwaZulu-Natal off the South African coast, and Port Stephens in New South Wales and lives from 10 to 240m under water.

== Ecology ==
This species is often found on vertical rockfaces and when not feeding it contracts tightly, and its resemblance to a cauliflower is striking. It is fed upon by the walking anemone, Preactis millardae.
