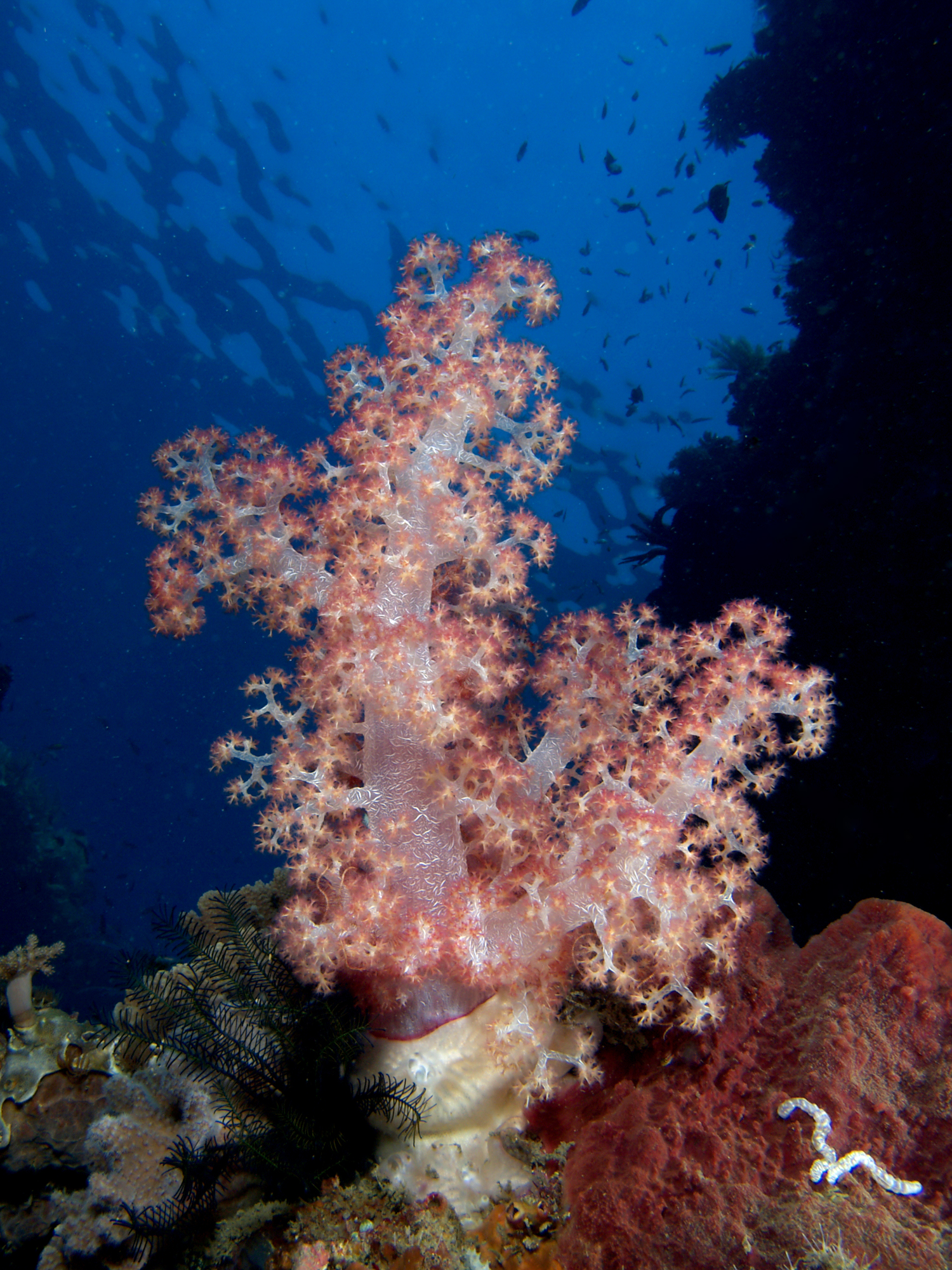
- Litophyton sp.

Scientific classification
- Kingdom: Animalia
- Phylum: Cnidaria
- Subphylum: Anthozoa
- Class: Octocorallia
- Order: Malacalcyonacea
- Family: Nephtheidae
- Genus: Litophyton; Forskål, 1775

Species
- See text

Synonyms
- Nephthea Audouin, 1828; Nephthya Ehrenberg, 1834

= Litophyton =

Genus of corals

Litophyton is a genus of soft corals in the family Nephtheidae.

== Species ==
The World Register of Marine Species includes the following species in the genus:

- Litophyton acuticonicum (Verseveldt, 1974)
- Litophyton amentaceum (Studer, 1894)
- Litophyton arboreum Forskål, 1775
- Litophyton bayeri (Verseveldt, 1966)
- Litophyton berdfordi (Shann, 1912)
- Litophyton brassicum (Kükenthal, 1903)
- Litophyton bumastum (Verseveldt, 1973)
- Litophyton capnelliformis (Thomson & Dean, 1931)
- Litophyton carnosum (Kükenthal)
- Litophyton cervispiculosum (Thomson & Dean, 1931)
- Litophyton chabrolii (Andouin, 1828)
- Litophyton columnaris (Studer, 1895)
- Litophyton compactum (Verseveldt, 1966)
- Litophyton concinnum (Kükenthal, 1905)
- Litophyton corallinum (Kükenthal, 1910)
- Litophyton crassum (Kükenthal, 1903)
- Litophyton cupressiformis (Kükenthal, 1903)
- Litophyton curvum van Ofwegen, 2016
- Litophyton debilis (Kükenthal, 1895)
- Litophyton digitatum (Wright & Studer, 1889)
- Litophyton elongatum (Kükenthal, 1895)
- Litophyton erectum (Kükenthal, 1903)
- Litophyton erinaceum Kükenthal
- Litophyton filamentosum (Verseveldt, 1973)
- Litophyton formosanum Kükenthal, 1903
- Litophyton fulvum Forskål, 1775
- Litophyton globulosum (May, 1899)
- Litophyton gracillimum (Thomson & Dean, 1931)
- Litophyton graeffei (Kükenthal, 1896)
- Litophyton griseum (Kükenthal, 1895)
- Litophyton juniperum (Thomson & Dean, 1931)
- Litophyton laevis (Kükenthal, 1913)
- Litophyton lanternarium (Verseveldt, 1973)
- Litophyton legiopolypum (Verseveldt & Alderslade, 1982)
- Litophyton lighti Roxas, 1933
- Litophyton maldivensis (Hickson, 1905)
- Litophyton mollis (Macfadyan, 1936)
- Litophyton nigrum (Kükenthal, 1895)
- Litophyton orientale Roxas, 1933
- Litophyton pacificum (Kükenthal, 1903)
- Litophyton pyramidalis (Kükenthal, 1895)
- Litophyton ramosum (Quoy & Gaimard, 1833)
- Litophyton rigidum Light
- Litophyton rubrum (Kükenthal, 1910)
- Litophyton savignyi (Ehrenberg, 1834)
- Litophyton setoensis (Utinomi, 1954)
- Litophyton sibogae (Thomson & Dean, 1931)
- Litophyton simulatum (Verseveldt, 1970)
- Litophyton sphaerophorum (Kükenthal, 1903)
- Litophyton striatum (Kükenthal, 1903)
- Litophyton tenuis (Kükenthal, 1896)
- Litophyton thujarium (Kükenthal, 1903)
- Litophyton tongaensis (Kükenthal, 1903)
- Litophyton viridis (May, 1898)
