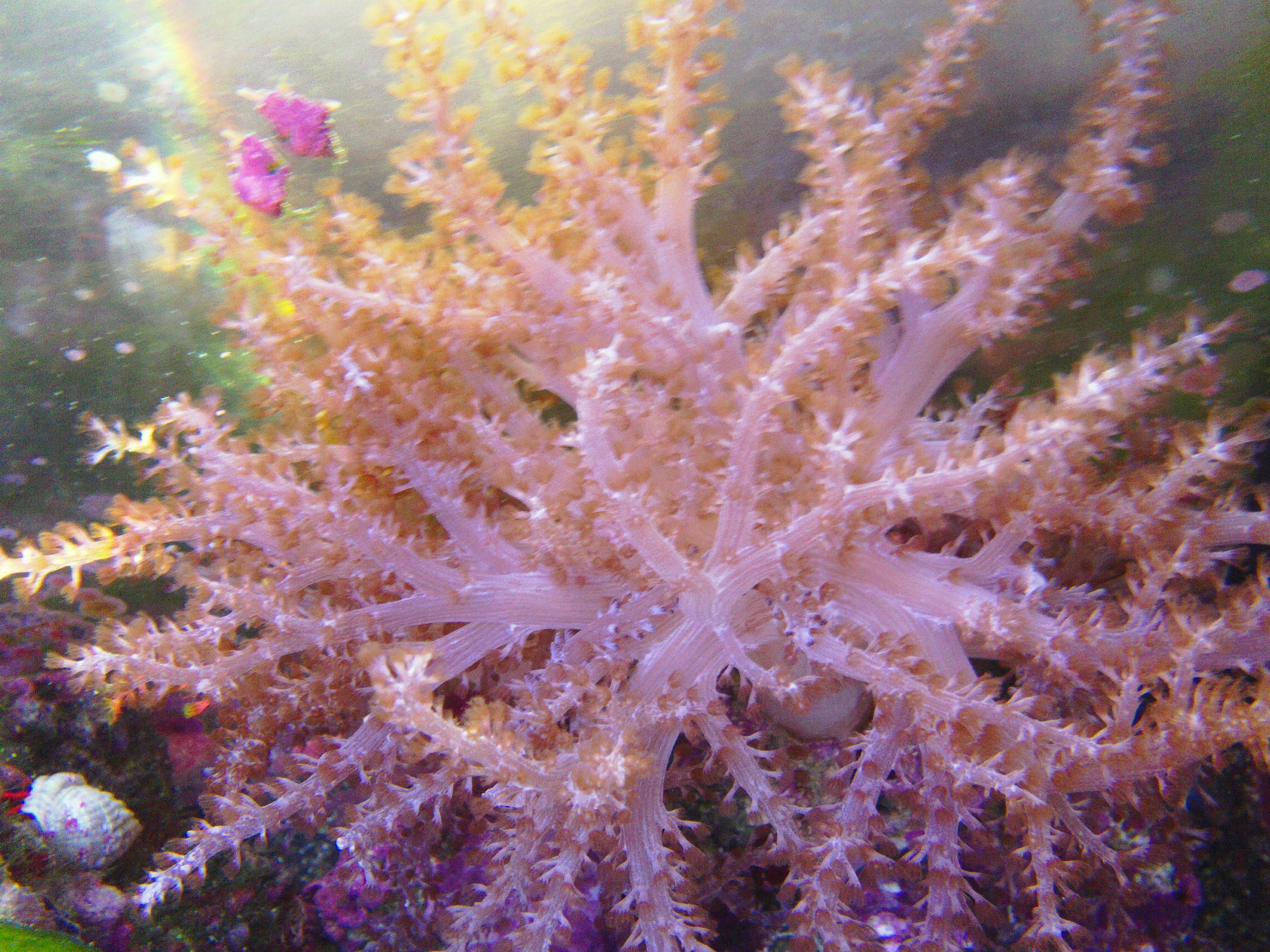
- Capnella sp.

Scientific classification
- Kingdom: Animalia
- Phylum: Cnidaria
- Subphylum: Anthozoa
- Class: Octocorallia
- Order: Malacalcyonacea
- Family: Nephtheidae; Gray, 1862

Genera
- See text

= Nephtheidae =

Family of corals

Nephtheidae is a family of soft corals in the phylum Cnidaria. Members of this family are known as carnation corals, tree corals or colt soft corals. They are very attractive and show a wide range of rich and pastel colours including reds, pinks, yellows and purples. They are popular with reef aquarium hobbyists.

Most of these corals are arborescent and have little knobs on the end of their rubbery branches. The coral polyps tend to retract in the daytime which gives these corals their alternative name of broccoli corals because of their resemblance to the vegetable. At night the polyps emerge and extend their tentacles to feed, looking like little bunches of flowers on the ends of the branches.

== Genera ==
The World Register of Marine Species includes the following genera in this family:

- Chromonephthea van Ofwegen, 2005
- Coronephthya Utinomi, 1966
- Dendronephthya Kükenthal, 1905
- Litophyton Forskål, 1775
- Neospongodes Kükenthal, 1903
- Pacifiphyton Williams, 1997
- Scleronephthya Studer, 1887
- Stereonephthya Kükenthal, 1905
- Umbellulifera Thomson & Dean, 1931
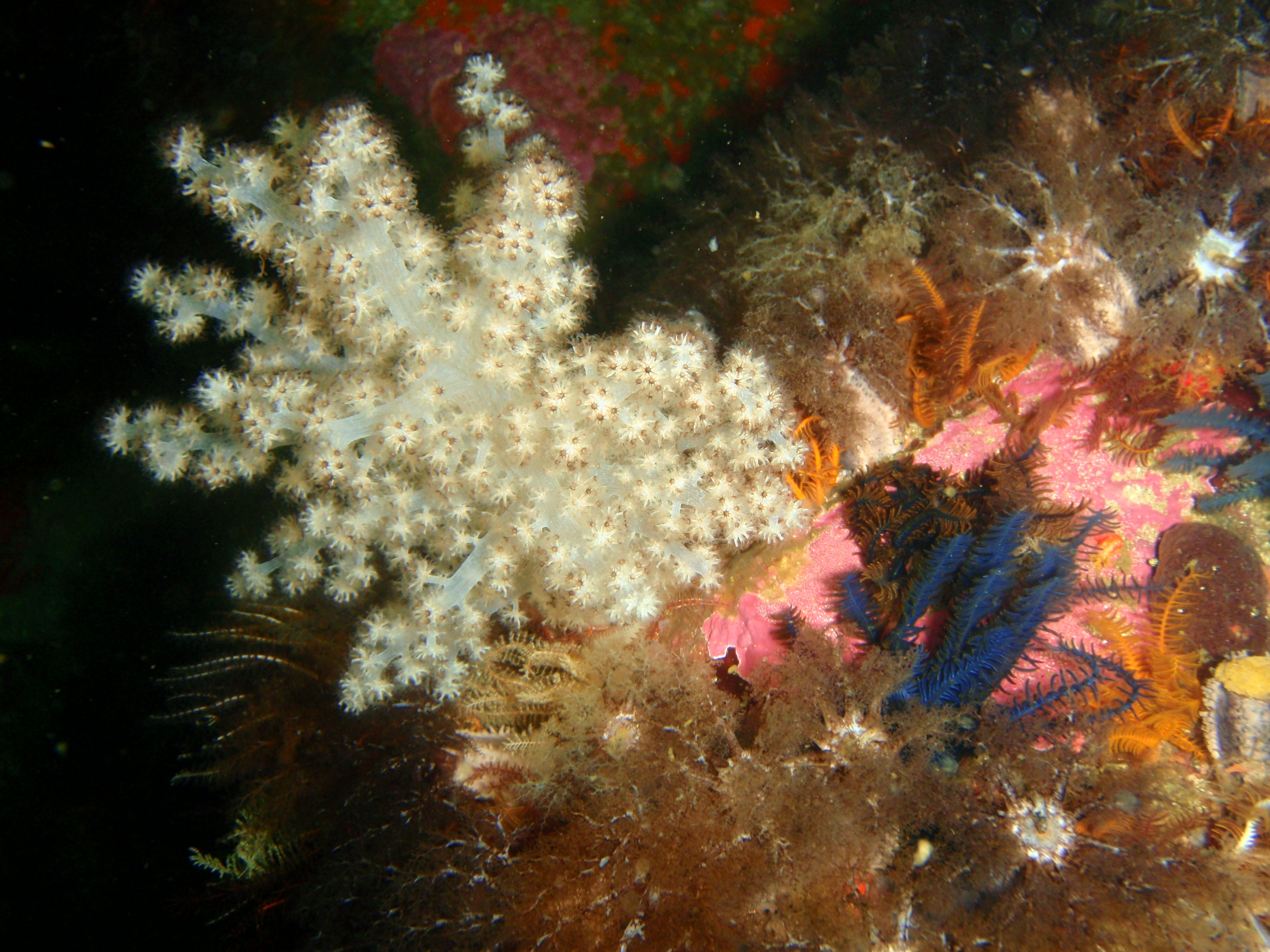
Capnella thyrsoidea

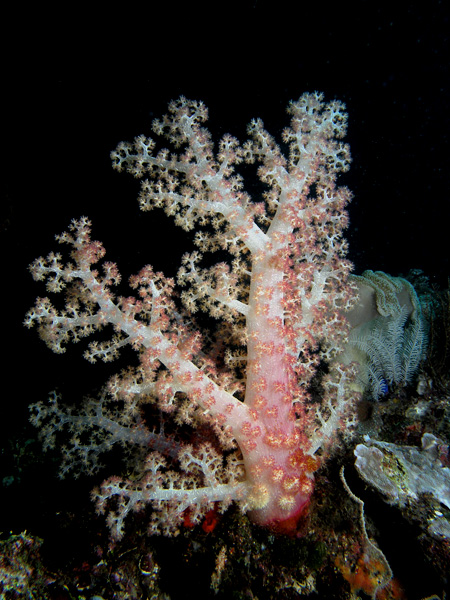
Dendronephthya klunzingeri

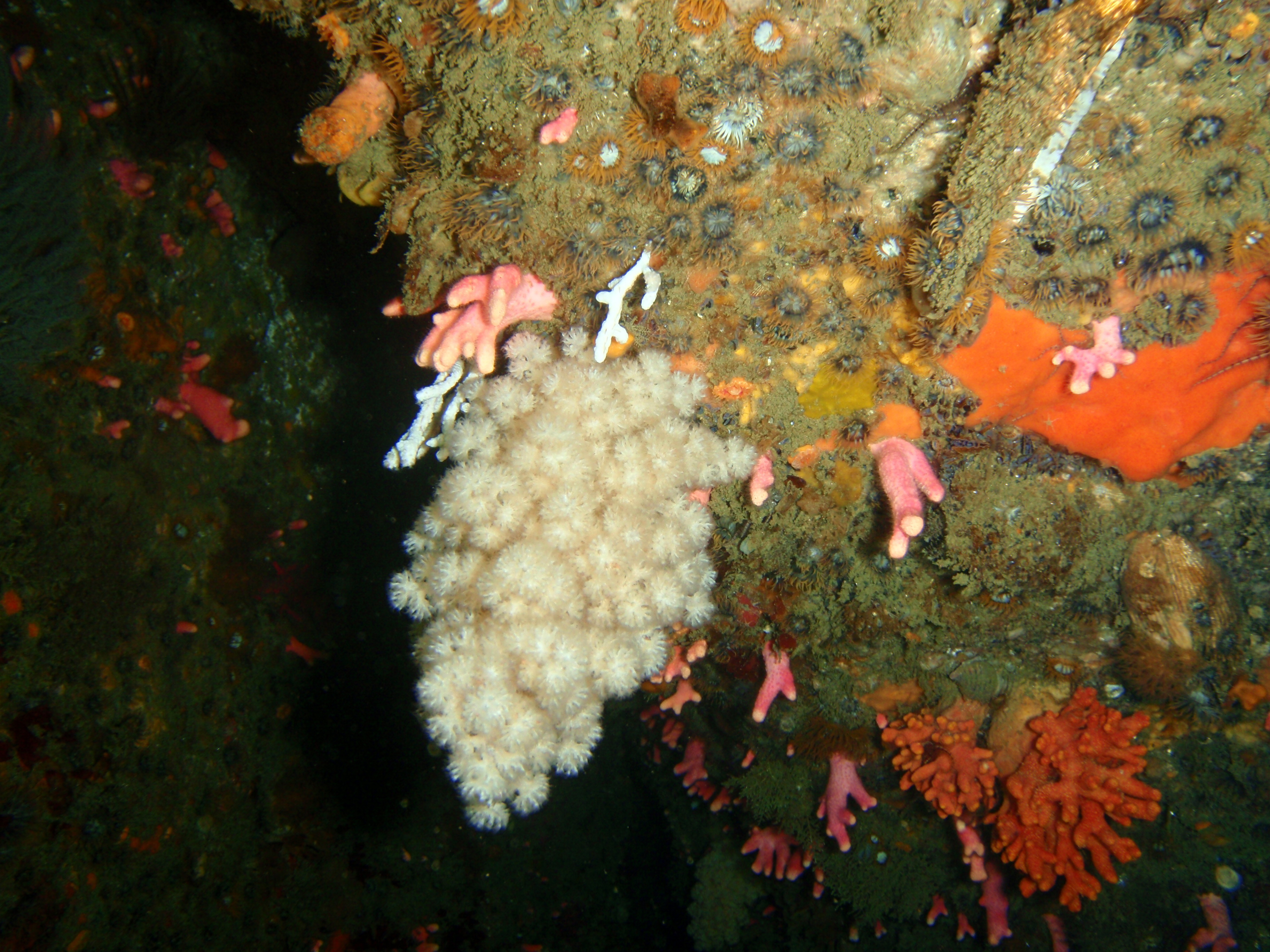
Eunephthya thyrsoidea

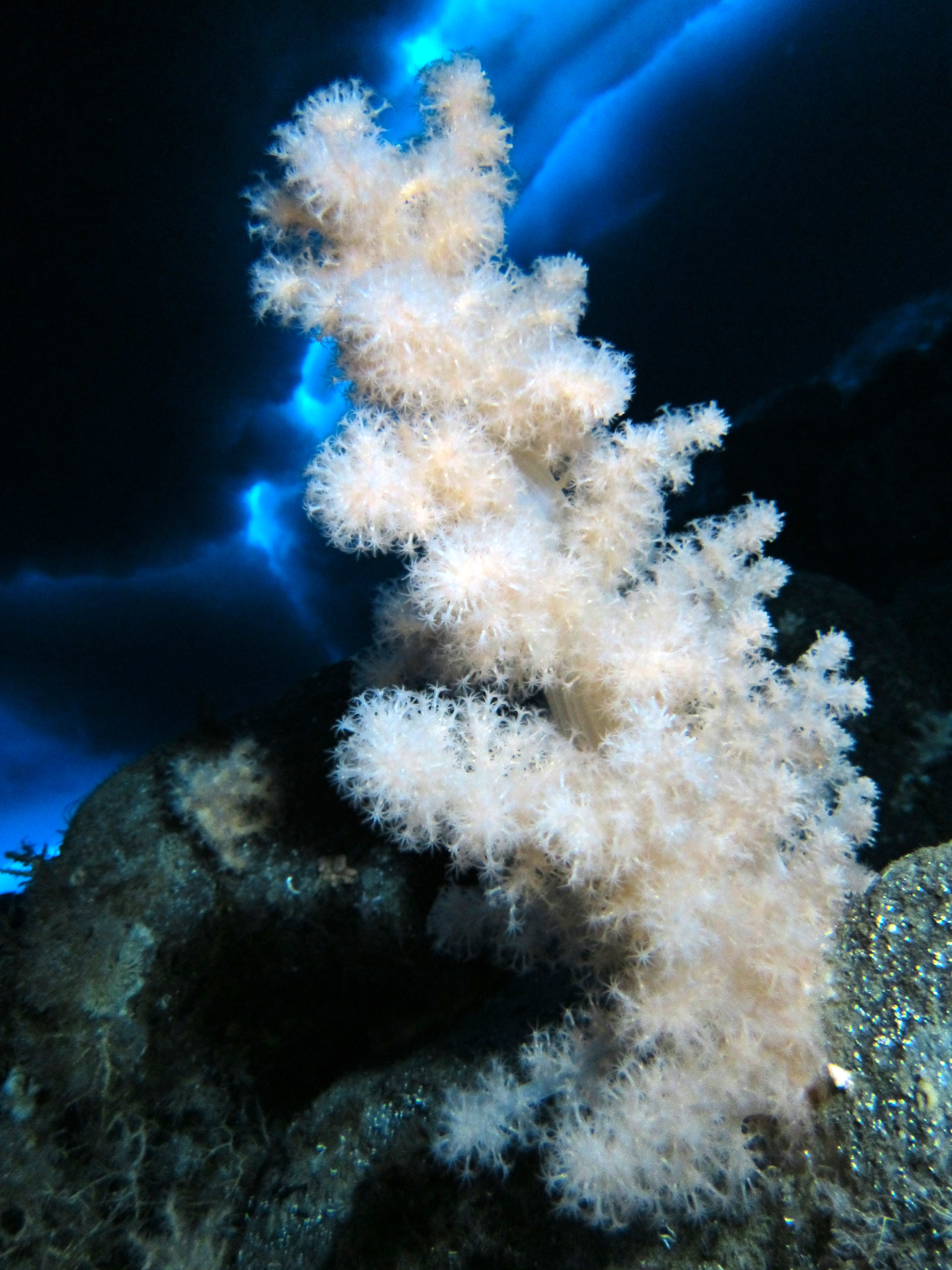
Gersemia antarctica

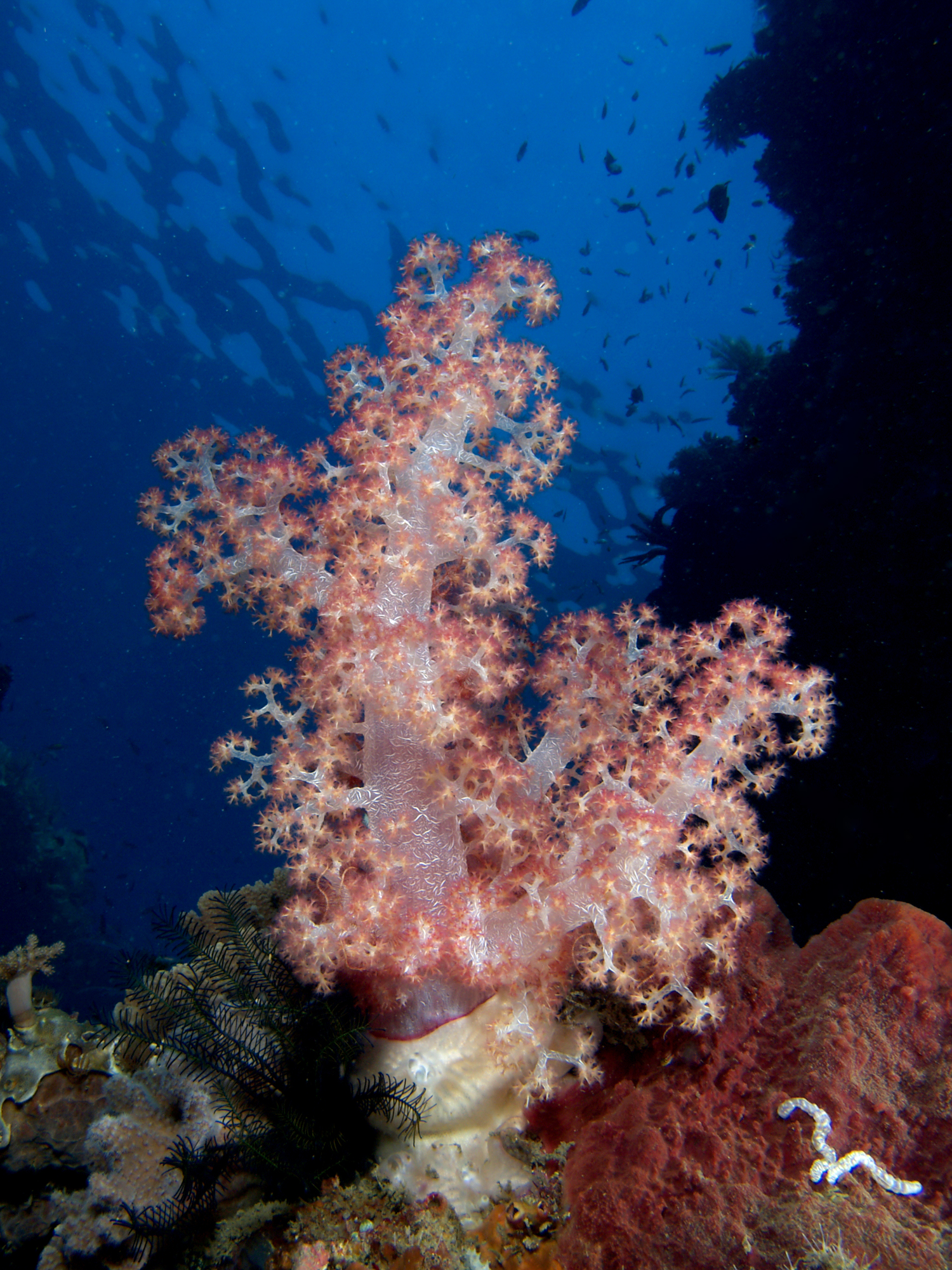
Nephthya sp.

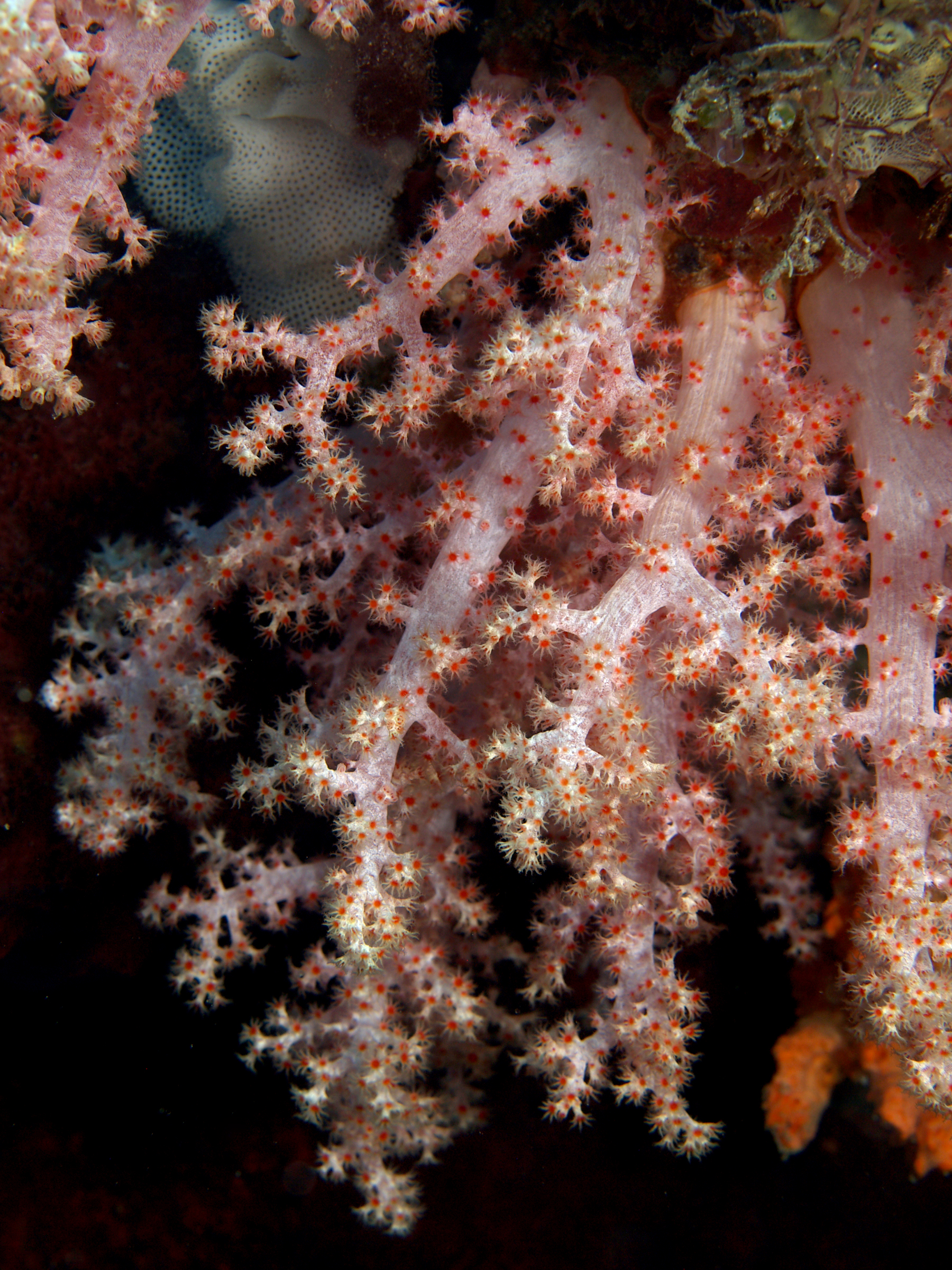
Scleronephthya sp.
