= Aliwal Shoal =

Rocky reef off the coast of KwaZulu-Natal, South Africa

Coordinates: 30°16′01″S 30°53′14″E

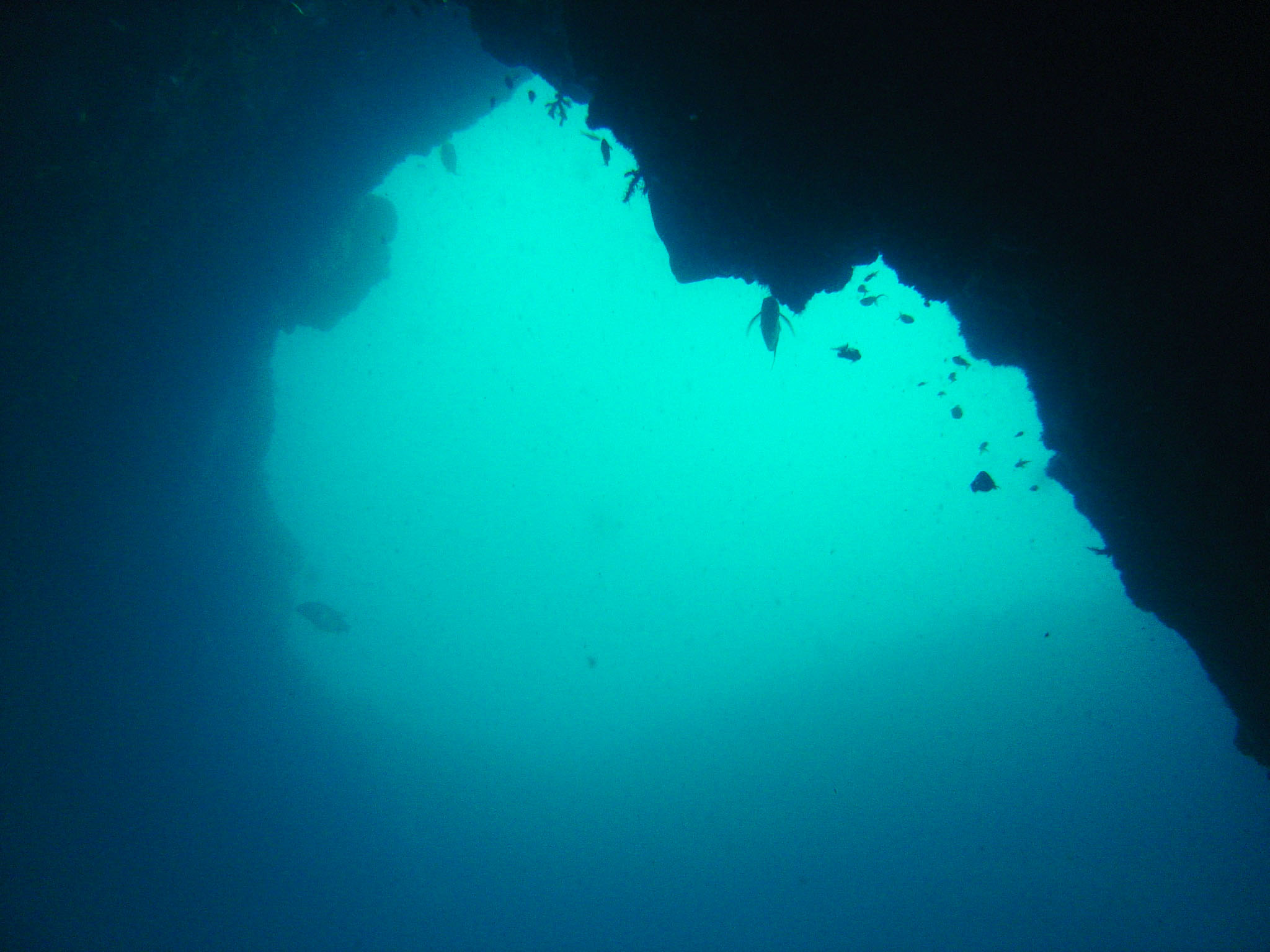
The arch at Cathedral dive site at Aliwal Shoal

The Aliwal Shoal is a rocky reef which is the remains of an ancient sand dune approximately 5 kilometres (3.1 mi) off the coast of KwaZulu-Natal, South Africa. The reef is inhabited by many kinds of hard and soft corals and other marine invertebrates, and a variety of tropical and subtropical fish species. Aliwal Shoal was named after the near-sinking in 1849 of the three-masted vessel Aliwal, captained by James Anderson. There are two wrecks near the reef that are popular recreational dive sites. The Norwegian bulk carrier MV Produce sank in 1974, and SS Nebo sank in 1884. Aliwal Shoal has diverse marine life, including large predators, and is popular as a recreational scuba diving destination. The Shoal is known especially for its abundance of Grey nurse sharks (known locally as ragged tooth sharks or "raggies") between July and November when the sharks congregate there to mate.

== Morphology ==
Aliwal shoal is part of a large offshore reef complex. The narrow ridge parallel to the coastline about 5 kilometres (3.1 mi) offshore, more specifically referred to as the Crown, is the part usually referred to as Aliwal shoal, and this area is inside the sanctuary zone of the Marine Protected Area. The shallowest part, extending to within 6 metres (20 ft) of the surface, is at the north end of the Crown. To the north the bottom slopes down relatively steeply, and to the sides the slope is less. The shoal is about 380 metres (1,250 ft) wide to the north, narrower to the south, and then spreads out towards the coast in the section known as the Ridge. Average depth of the Crown is about 12.5 metres (41 ft), and the Ridge is about 19.5 metres (64 ft) average depth, with a few isolated pinnacles.

== Geology ==
The reef consists of aeolianite with subordinate beachrock. It is thought to be sunken coastline of the late Pleistocene. The type of rock was determined from samples recovered from the hull of the vessel Aimée Lykes, which struck the shoal in 1963, and made it to Durban for repairs.

== Ecology ==
Aliwal shoal is a subtidal, algal-dominated subtropical reef in the transitional region between the warm-temperate reefs of Pondoland and the tropical to subtropical reefs of Maputaland. The benthic communities are dominated by algae and sponges, but various soft and hard corals, echinoderms and ascidians are also present.

The environment can be classified as marginal, in that it supports fauna of tropical, subtropical and warm temperate reefs. The diversity is comparable to similar latitude reefs of Australia.

The adjacent coastline of KwaZulu-Natal has a humid subtropical climate with summer rainfall, and the freshwater and riverine sedimentary discharge into the region is significant and affects turbidity and plankton blooms. Most of this input is from the mKomazi River at the north of the MPA. A marine pipeline operated by Sappi Saiccor discharges just outside the MPA.

The shoal is exposed to heavy wind-driven wave action, with an annual average swell height of 2.5 metres (8.2 ft).

The following benthic taxa are recorded from the shoal:

Algae
Chlorophyta (green algae)
Codium lucasii
Ulva cf. rigida
Rhodophyta (red algae)
Amphiroa ephedraea
Callophycus condominius
Champia compressa
Dichotomaria diesingiana
Hypnea viridis
Hypnea sp.
Laurencia brongniartii
Meristotheca papulosa
Osmundaria serrata (ex Vidalia serrata)
Peyssonnelia capensis
Phaeophyta (brown algae)
Dictyota dichotoma var. intricata
Exallosorus harveyanus
Lobophora variegata
Stypopodium multipartitum
Zonaria subarticulata
Porifera
Dragmacidon sanguineum
Cliona orientalis
Chondropsis sp.
Fascaplysinopsis sp.
Forcepia sp.
Geodia sp.
Hemiasterella vasiformis
Oceanapia aff. ramsayi
Placospongia sp.
Polymastia sp.
Rhabderemia sp.
Spheciospongia excentrica
Spheciospongia globularis
Spheciospongia vagabunda
Suberites kelleri
Octocorallia (soft corals)
Dendronephthya sp.
Eleutherobia aurea
Leptophyton benayahui
Sinularia brassica
Gorgonians
Acabaria sp.
Homophyton verrucosum
Sea anemones
Cerianthus sp.
Heteractis magnifica
Zoanthids
Palythoa natalensis
Black coral
Antipathes sp.
Scleractinia (hard corals)
Dendrophyllia sp.
Favites sp.
Montipora sp.
Pocillopora damicornis
Pocillopora verrucosa
Stylophora pistillata
Tubastraea micrantha
Annelida
Polychaeta
Arthropoda
Panulirus homarus
Bryozoa (Ectoprocta)
Sertella sp.
Unidentified species 2
Mollusca
Hyotissa hyotis
Phyllidia varicosa
Echinodermata
Diadema setosum
Fromia sp.
Linckia laevigata
Linckia guildingi
Mithrodia clavigera
Unidentified crinoidea
Ascidiacea
Sigillina sp.
Sycozoa sp.

=== Benthic communities ===
Three distinct benthic communities occur on the Crown reef, depending on topography, sediment cover and wave energy. The large shallow areas of the shoal have the highest abundance of zooxanthellate hard corals, the encrusting zooxanthellate sponge, Suberites kelleri and the hard corals Stylophora pistillata and Pocillopora spp., which appear to be tolerant of the high energy environment. This community has the lowest abundance of red foliose algae and occupies the reef top, inshore and offshore slopes of the northern, middle and southern regions at depths from 10 to 14 metres (33 to 46 ft). A second community inhabits the steep edges of the shoal and has larger proportion of Polychaetes, the soft coral Eleutherobia aurea, and the sponge Spheciospongia globularis. This is the only community in which Suberites kelleri is absent. This community covers the high to medium relief inshore and offshore walls and broken edges of the middle and northern regions in the 14 to 20 metres (46 to 66 ft) depth range. A third community lives deeper on the shoal and is dominated by coralline and red foliose algae. This community covers the medium to low relief inshore and offshore slopes and broken edges of the middle, southern and far southern regions, and the top of the far southern region in the 16 to 22 metres (52 to 72 ft) depth range.

=== Ecoregion ===
Marine ecoregions of the South African exclusive economic zone (2011 to 2018)

The Natal inshore ecoregion is transitional between the warm temperate reefs of Pondoland to the south and the tropical/subtropical reefs of Maputaland to the north. This is evident from the distribution of algae and corals. The corals of Aliwal shoal are less diverse than those of Maputaland, but more diverse than those of Pondoland, while the pattern for algal diversity show the opposite trend, being more diverse than Maputaland and less diverse than Pondoland. The high biomass of algae indicate an adequate supply of nutrients, while the relatively lower biomass of zooxanthellate corals indicate turbidity, light and temperature levels that are not optimum for these animals. The high occurrence of filter-feeding sponges, ascidians and polychaetes suggest that the suspended particulates causing the turbidity are adequate for their nutrition.

== Marine Protected Area (MPA) ==
Aliwal Shoal Marine Protected Area was established with an area of 126 km^{2} in 1991, and was proclaimed by Mohammed Valli Moosa, at that time the Minister of Environmental Affairs and Tourism, in Government Gazette No. 26431 of 4 June 2004 in terms of section 43 of the Marine Living Resources Act, 18 of 1998 to regulate the management and protection of the Aliwal Shoal Marine Protected Area in terms of section 77(2)(x)(i), of the Marine Living Resources Act, 18 of 1998. The MPA extended 18.3 km (11.4 mi) along the coast from the mouth of the Mkomazi River at 30°11.92'S; 030°48.29'E and the mouth of the Mzimayi River at 30°20.80'S; 030°43.60'E; for a distance of approximately 7 km (4.3 mi) from the coast, and comprises a control zone and two restricted zones in which no fishing is allowed. The Crown area restricted zone is enclosed by 12 points, which lie on the 25 metres (82 ft) isobath, and covers approximately 2.5 square kilometres (0.97 sq mi). The Produce restricted zone is a smaller area containing the wreck of the Produce. The rest of the MPA is the controlled zone, in which limited fishing is allowed. The managing agency for the MPA is Ezemvelo KZN Wildlife. The Aliwal Shoal MPA was extended to 670 km^{2} by the addition of the large Aliwal Shoal Offshore Marine Protected Area in 2018/2019.
