= Seriatopora aculeata =

Conservation status
- Endangered (IUCN 3.1)

Scientific classification
- Kingdom: Animalia
- Phylum: Cnidaria
- Subphylum: Anthozoa
- Class: Hexacorallia
- Order: Scleractinia
- Family: Pocilloporidae
- Genus: Seriatopora
- Species: S. aculeata

Binomial name
- Seriatopora aculeata Quelch, 1886

Species of coral

Seriatopora aculeata is a species of colonial stony coral in the family Pocilloporidae. It forms a bushy clump. It is native to the Central Indo-Pacific and the Oceanic West Pacific. Its range includes the Philippines, the Great Barrier Reef, Fiji, Indonesia, the Coral Sea, southern Madagascar and Vanuatu. It grows in shallow reef environments, at depths down to about 40 metres (130 ft). It is an uncommon species and subject to coral diseases and bleaching. The International Union for Conservation of Nature has assessed the conservation status of this species as being endangered.

== Description ==
Seriatopora aculeata is a colonial species and can grow to a diameter of about 20 cm (8 in). It is a zooxanthellate species containing symbiotic dinoflagellates in its tissues. It is similar in appearance to Seriatopora hystrix and Seriatopora stellata but the branches are stout and tend to be fused in small clumps. The corallites are scattered over the surface of the branches and the polyps are often expanded during the day. The colour of this species is usually pink or creamy-white.
