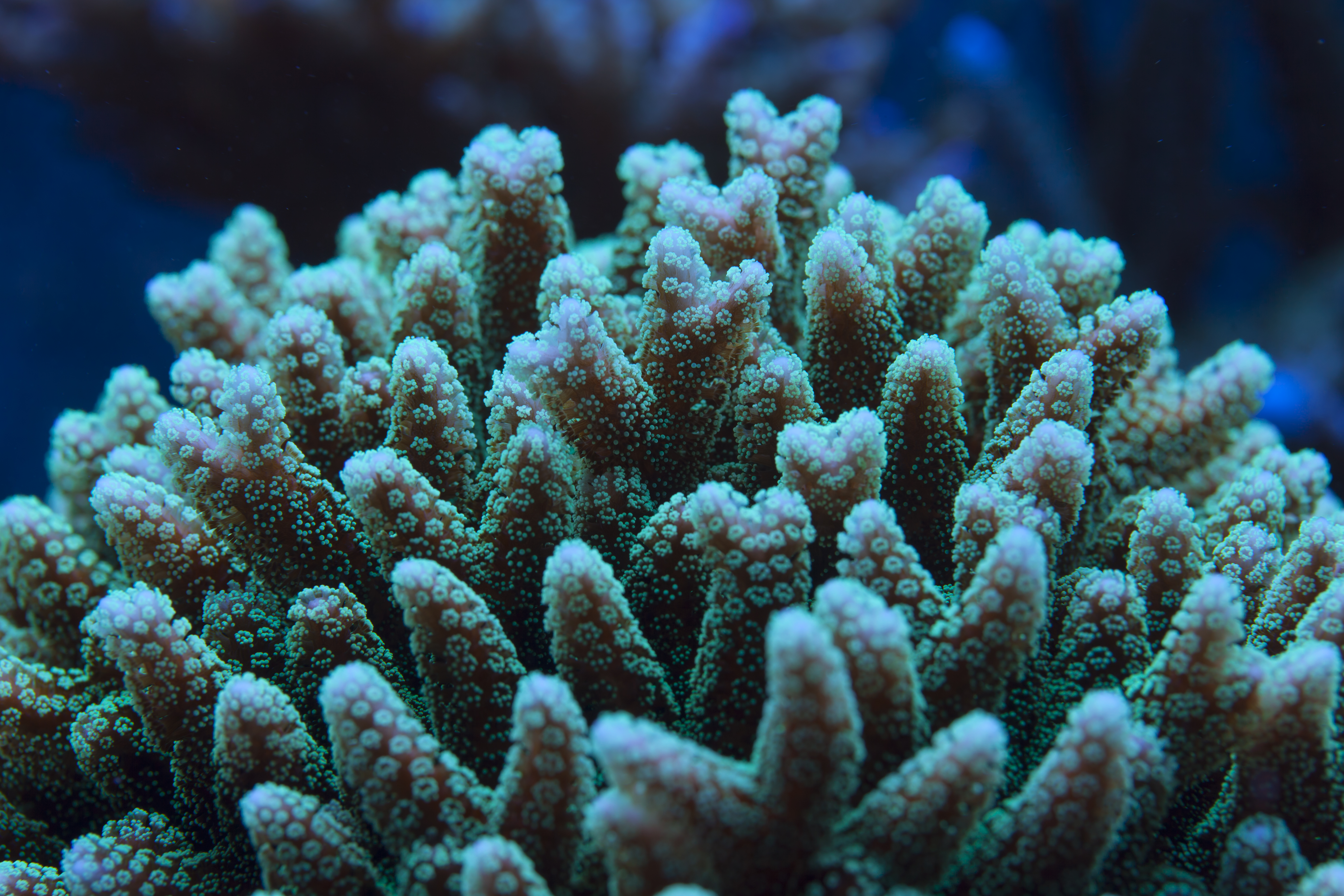

Conservation status
- Vulnerable (IUCN 3.1)

Scientific classification
- Kingdom: Animalia
- Phylum: Cnidaria
- Subphylum: Anthozoa
- Class: Hexacorallia
- Order: Scleractinia
- Family: Pocilloporidae
- Genus: Seriatopora
- Species: S. caliendrum

Binomial name
- Seriatopora caliendrum Ehrenberg, 1834

Synonyms
- Seriatopora prescillae Nemenzo, 1971

= Seriatopora caliendrum =

Species of coral

Seriatopora caliendrum is a species of colonial stony coral in the family Pocilloporidae. It forms a bushy clump and is commonly known as the green birdsnest coral. It is native to East Africa, the Red Sea and the western Indo-Pacific region, the type locality being the Red Sea. It grows in shallow water on reef slopes, particularly back-reef slopes, at depths down to about 25 metres (82 ft). The International Union for Conservation of Nature has assessed the conservation status of this species as being vulnerable.

== Description ==
Seriatopora caliendrum resembles Seriatopora hystrix but is less common. The branches are rather thicker and have blunter tips. The corallites are mostly hooded so that robust colonies resemble slender colonies of Stylophora pistillata, however the corallites are in neat rows and have oval openings, which is not the case in S. pistillata.
