= Birdsnest coral =

Birdsnest coral may refer to several different species of coral:

- species of the genus Seriatopora
- species of the genus Stylophora
