= Lissodendoryx collinsi =

Scientific classification
- Kingdom: Animalia
- Phylum: Porifera
- Class: Demospongiae
- Order: Poecilosclerida
- Family: Coelosphaeridae
- Genus: Lissodendoryx
- Species: L. collinsi

Binomial name
- Lissodendoryx collinsi Goodwin, Brewin & Brickle, 2012

Species of sponge

Lissodendoryx collinsi is a species of demosponge first found on the coast of South Georgia island, in the south-western Southern Ocean. The discovery of Lissodendoryx collinsi and 14 other new species resulted in increasing the previously reported low sponge endemicity off South Georgia.
