= Inflatella belli =

Scientific classification
- Kingdom: Animalia
- Phylum: Porifera
- Class: Demospongiae
- Order: Poecilosclerida
- Family: Coelosphaeridae
- Genus: Inflatella
- Species: I. belli

Binomial name
- Inflatella belli (Kirkpatrick, 1907)

Synonyms
- Inflatella fistulosa Hentschel, 1914; Joyeuxia belli Kirkpatrick, 1907

Species of sponge widespread in the Southern Hemisphere

Inflatella belli, or the gooseberry sponge, is a species of demosponge that appears to be restricted to the southern hemisphere, where it is widespread. It occurs from the coast of Namibia and the Indo-pacific, down to the Subantarctic and Antarctic regions.

== Description ==
The gooseberry sponge is a green to yellow-brown species which grows in a semi-spherical to ovoid form. The outside is tough and leathery and the inside soft and pulpy. The inner layer is darker than the outer layers. The surface is covered with long trumpet-shaped protrusions. It may grow to be 50 mm (2.0 in) wide.

=== Spicules ===
The oxeas (spicules pointed at both ends) are straight or slightly curved. One end is sharply pointed and the other more rounded.

=== Skeleton ===
The spicules grow together to from several overlapping layers in the cortex. The papillae are made of a dense layer of upright spicules. The spicules in the choanosome are arranged in an irregular network.

== Distribution and habitat ==
This deep water sponge is widespread across the southern hemisphere. It has been found off the coasts of Namibia and South Africa and in the Indo-pacific region (off New Zealand), as well as being a common species in the Antarctic and Subantarctic regions. Although it has been found as shallow as 18 m (59 ft), it is far more common at greater depths, where it grows on hard substrates.

== Ecology ==
This species may be parasitised by diatoms, which get taken up while the sponge is feeding. It is unclear why they get incorporated into the sponge, but it has been suggested that their siliceous shells may cause the sponge to mistake them for siliceous particles, which they use to build up their skeleton. In parasitised sponges, the carbohydrate concentration is inversely proportional to that of chlorophyll-a, suggesting that the diatoms are using the products of their host's metabolism as an energy source. This ultimately expands their niche as they are able to survive in habitats with insufficient light for photosynthesis, while living in a relatively sheltered environment.

== Bioactive compounds ==
As is the case with many sponge species, the gooseberry sponge contains several bioactive compounds which may be of pharmaceutical interest and importance. Thus far it has been found to inhibit the activity of β-amylase as well as being an effective antibacterial or antifungal against specific pathogenic strains. As an antibacterial, it was found to be effective against an Antarctic strain of Pseudomonas, a laboratory strain of E. coli, Staphylococcus saprophyticus and methicillin-resistant Staphylococcus pseudintermedius. As an antifungal, it was found to be particularly effective against Candida parapsilosis (an emerging pathogen responsible for catheterrelated infections and opportunistic nosocomial blood-born diseases in immunocompromised patients). It also reduced the growth of Debaryomyces hansenii, Exophiala dermatitidis, Fusarium dimerum, and Aureobasidum melanogenum. With the exception of Debaryomyces hansenii, which is found in Arctic seawater, these fungal cultures were all isolated from normal household sources, such as dishwashers and potable water.
