= Calyx podatypa =

Scientific classification
- Kingdom: Animalia
- Phylum: Porifera
- Class: Demospongiae
- Order: Haplosclerida
- Family: Phloeodictyidae
- Genus: Calyx
- Species: C. podatypa

Binomial name
- Calyx podatypa (de Laubenfels, 1934)

Synonyms
- List: Haliclona podatypa de Laubenfels, 1934; Pachypellina podatypa (De Laubenfels, 1934)

Species of sponge

Calyx podatypa is a species of sea sponge belonging to the family Phloeodictyidae. It is native to the Caribbean. The species was first described in 1934 by American spongiologist Max Walker de Laubenfels. It is commonly found in shallow reefs, among seagrass and on mangrove roots. It is described as being mostly hollow with growths that range from branched to lobate in shape and tubular projections. It has round openings between 1-5mm in size. The colour is "Brown-yellowish to greenish" on the outside and tan on the inside.

== Antimicrobial compounds ==
A number of biologically active compounds have been isolated from Calyx podatypa including Diketopiperazines and N-methylpyridinium salts with antimicrobial effects.
