= Lissodendoryx =

Scientific classification
- Kingdom: Animalia
- Phylum: Porifera
- Class: Demospongiae
- Order: Poecilosclerida
- Family: Coelosphaeridae
- Genus: Lissodendoryx; Topsent, 1892

Genus of sponges

Lissodendoryx is a genus of sponges belonging to the family Coelosphaeridae.

The genus has cosmopolitan distribution.

Species:

Subgenus Acanthodoryx

- Lissodendoryx (Acanthodoryx) fibrosa (Lévi, 1961)

Subgenus Anomodoryx

- Lissodendoryx (Anomodoryx) amphispinulata Rützler, Piantoni & Díaz, 2007
- Lissodendoryx (Anomodoryx) cavernosa (Topsent, 1892)
- Lissodendoryx (Anomodoryx) coralgardeniensis Samaai & Gibbons, 2005
- Lissodendoryx (Anomodoryx) dendyi (Whitelegge, 1901)
- Lissodendoryx (Anomodoryx) incrustans Cruz-Barraza, Carballo & Aguilar-Camacho, 2023
- Lissodendoryx (Anomodoryx) oxychaetum (Menegola, Santos, Moraes & Muricy, 2012)
- Lissodendoryx (Anomodoryx) recife (Boury-Esnault, 1973)
- Lissodendoryx (Anomodoryx) sigmata (de Laubenfels, 1949)
- Lissodendoryx (Anomodoryx) tylota (Boury-Esnault, 1973)
- Lissodendoryx (Anomodoryx) vulcanus Cavalcanti, Santos & Pinheiro, 2014

Subgenus Lissodendoryx

- Lissodendoryx (Lissodendoryx) albemarlensis Desqueyroux-Faúndez & van Soest, 1997
- Lissodendoryx (Lissodendoryx) amaknakensis (Lambe, 1895)
- Lissodendoryx (Lissodendoryx) areolata Lévi, 1963
- Lissodendoryx (Lissodendoryx) baculata Topsent, 1897
- Lissodendoryx (Lissodendoryx) balanophilus Annandale, 1914
- Lissodendoryx (Lissodendoryx) barkleyensis Ott, Reiswig, McDaniel & Harbo, 2019
- Lissodendoryx (Lissodendoryx) basispinosa Sarà, 1958
- Lissodendoryx (Lissodendoryx) behringi Koltun, 1958
- Lissodendoryx (Lissodendoryx) buchanani Topsent, 1913
- Lissodendoryx (Lissodendoryx) caduca (Schmidt, 1868)
- Lissodendoryx (Lissodendoryx) calypta de Laubenfels, 1954
- Lissodendoryx (Lissodendoryx) carolinensis Wilson, 1911
- Lissodendoryx (Lissodendoryx) catenata Lévi, 1993
- Lissodendoryx (Lissodendoryx) certa (Topsent, 1892)
- Lissodendoryx (Lissodendoryx) ciocalyptoides Burton, 1959
- Lissodendoryx (Lissodendoryx) colombiensis Zea & van Soest, 1986
- Lissodendoryx (Lissodendoryx) complicata (Hansen, 1885)
- Lissodendoryx (Lissodendoryx) cratera (Row, 1911)
- Lissodendoryx (Lissodendoryx) damirioides Burton, 1959
- Lissodendoryx (Lissodendoryx) digitata (Ridley & Dendy, 1886)
- Lissodendoryx (Lissodendoryx) fertilior Topsent, 1904
- Lissodendoryx (Lissodendoryx) firma (Lambe, 1895)
- Lissodendoryx (Lissodendoryx) flabellata Burton, 1929
- Lissodendoryx (Lissodendoryx) florida Koltun, 1955
- Lissodendoryx (Lissodendoryx) fragilis (Fristedt, 1885)
- Lissodendoryx (Lissodendoryx) fusca (Ridley & Dendy, 1886)
- Lissodendoryx (Lissodendoryx) grata (Thiele, 1903)
- Lissodendoryx (Lissodendoryx) grisea (Hansen, 1885)
- Lissodendoryx (Lissodendoryx) inaequalis (Baer, 1906)
- Lissodendoryx (Lissodendoryx) indistincta (Fristedt, 1887)
- Lissodendoryx (Lissodendoryx) infrequens (Carter, 1881)
- Lissodendoryx (Lissodendoryx) ingolei Payne, Samaai & Gibbons, 2025
- Lissodendoryx (Lissodendoryx) innominata Burton, 1929
- Lissodendoryx (Lissodendoryx) isodictyalis (Carter, 1882)
- Lissodendoryx (Lissodendoryx) ivanovi Koltun, 1958
- Lissodendoryx (Lissodendoryx) jacksoniana (Lendenfeld, 1888)
- Lissodendoryx (Lissodendoryx) kyma de Laubenfels, 1930
- Lissodendoryx (Lissodendoryx) laxa de Laubenfels, 1935
- Lissodendoryx (Lissodendoryx) littoralis Ott, Reiswig, McDaniel & Harbo, 2019
- Lissodendoryx (Lissodendoryx) lobosa Lundbeck, 1905
- Lissodendoryx (Lissodendoryx) lundbecki Topsent, 1913
- Lissodendoryx (Lissodendoryx) marplatensis Cuartas, 1992
- Lissodendoryx (Lissodendoryx) microchelifera Hofman & van Soest, 1995
- Lissodendoryx (Lissodendoryx) microraphida (Alcolado, 1984)
- Lissodendoryx (Lissodendoryx) minuta Burton, 1956
- Lissodendoryx (Lissodendoryx) monticularis Baer, 1906
- Lissodendoryx (Lissodendoryx) neospinulosa Deshmukh & Hernández, 2023
- Lissodendoryx (Lissodendoryx) noxiosa de Laubenfels, 1930
- Lissodendoryx (Lissodendoryx) oxeota Koltun, 1958
- Lissodendoryx (Lissodendoryx) papillosa Koltun, 1958
- Lissodendoryx (Lissodendoryx) paucispinata (Ridley & Dendy, 1886)
- Lissodendoryx (Lissodendoryx) paucispinosa Topsent, 1928
- Lissodendoryx (Lissodendoryx) polymorpha (Topsent, 1890)
- Lissodendoryx (Lissodendoryx) pygmaea (Burton, 1931)
- Lissodendoryx (Lissodendoryx) rara Hoshino, 1981
- Lissodendoryx (Lissodendoryx) rex de Laubenfels, 1930
- Lissodendoryx (Lissodendoryx) similis Thiele, 1899
- Lissodendoryx (Lissodendoryx) simplex Topsent, 1904
- Lissodendoryx (Lissodendoryx) sophia (Fristedt, 1887)
- Lissodendoryx (Lissodendoryx) stephensoni Burton, 1936
- Lissodendoryx (Lissodendoryx) stipitata (Arnesen, 1903)
- Lissodendoryx (Lissodendoryx) strongylata van Soest, 1984
- Lissodendoryx (Lissodendoryx) styloderma Hentschel, 1914
- Lissodendoryx (Lissodendoryx) stylosa Bertolino & Calcinai, 2024
- Lissodendoryx (Lissodendoryx) ternatensis (Thiele, 1903)
- Lissodendoryx (Lissodendoryx) timorensis Hofman & van Soest, 1995
- Lissodendoryx (Lissodendoryx) toxaraphida Ott, Reiswig, McDaniel & Harbo, 2019
- Lissodendoryx (Lissodendoryx) tubicola Burton, 1959
- Lissodendoryx (Lissodendoryx) tylostyla Li, 1986
- Lissodendoryx (Lissodendoryx) variisclera (Swartschewsky, 1905)
- Lissodendoryx (Lissodendoryx) vicina Lundbeck, 1905

Subgenus Ectyodoryx

- Lissodendoryx (Ectyodoryx) acanthostylota Rützler, Piantoni & Díaz, 2007
- Lissodendoryx (Ectyodoryx) anacantha (Hentschel, 1914)
- Lissodendoryx (Ectyodoryx) antarctica Hentschel, 1914
- Lissodendoryx (Ectyodoryx) arenaria Burton, 1936
- Lissodendoryx (Ectyodoryx) atlantica (Stephens, 1916)
- Lissodendoryx (Ectyodoryx) balanoides (Koltun, 1959)
- Lissodendoryx (Ectyodoryx) ballena Fernandez, Cárdenas, Bravo, Lôbo-Hajdu, Willenz & Hajdu, 2016
- Lissodendoryx (Ectyodoryx) bifacialis Lévi & Lévi, 1983
- Lissodendoryx (Ectyodoryx) calcinaiae Van Soest & Hooper, 2020
- Lissodendoryx (Ectyodoryx) collinsi Goodwin, Brewin & Brickle, 2012
- Lissodendoryx (Ectyodoryx) coloanensis Fernandez, Cárdenas, Bravo, Lôbo-Hajdu, Willenz & Hajdu, 2016
- Lissodendoryx (Ectyodoryx) coralliophila (Burton, 1959)
- Lissodendoryx (Ectyodoryx) corrugata Fernandez, Cárdenas, Bravo, Lôbo-Hajdu, Willenz & Hajdu, 2016
- Lissodendoryx (Ectyodoryx) crelloides (Brøndsted, 1924)
- Lissodendoryx (Ectyodoryx) derjugini (Breitfuss, 1912)
- Lissodendoryx (Ectyodoryx) diegoramirezensis Fernandez, Cárdenas, Bravo, Lôbo-Hajdu, Willenz & Hajdu, 2016
- Lissodendoryx (Ectyodoryx) diversichela Lundbeck, 1905
- Lissodendoryx (Ectyodoryx) foliata (Fristedt, 1887)
- Lissodendoryx (Ectyodoryx) frondosa (Ridley & Dendy, 1886)
- Lissodendoryx (Ectyodoryx) inferiolabiatae Costa & Bertolino, 2022
- Lissodendoryx (Ectyodoryx) jasonensis Goodwin, Jones, Neely & Brickle, 2011
- Lissodendoryx (Ectyodoryx) jenjonesae Picton & Goodwin, 2007
- Lissodendoryx (Ectyodoryx) lindgreni (Laubenfels, 1936)
- Lissodendoryx (Ectyodoryx) lissostyla (Thomas, 1970)
- Lissodendoryx (Ectyodoryx) loyningi (Burton, 1934)
- Lissodendoryx (Ectyodoryx) maculata (Hentschel, 1911)
- Lissodendoryx (Ectyodoryx) multiformis (Brøndsted, 1932)
- Lissodendoryx (Ectyodoryx) nobilis (Ridley & Dendy, 1886)
- Lissodendoryx (Ectyodoryx) olgae (Hentschel, 1929)
- Lissodendoryx (Ectyodoryx) oligacantha (Hentschel, 1929)
- Lissodendoryx (Ectyodoryx) patagonica (Ridley & Dendy, 1886)
- Lissodendoryx (Ectyodoryx) plumosa (Hentschel, 1914)
- Lissodendoryx (Ectyodoryx) ramilobosa (Topsent, 1916)
- Lissodendoryx (Ectyodoryx) rhaphidiophora (Burton, 1959)
- Lissodendoryx (Ectyodoryx) roosevelti (de Laubenfels, 1939)
- Lissodendoryx (Ectyodoryx) stephensi (Burton, 1930)

Subgenus Waldoschmittia

- Lissodendoryx (Waldoschmittia) almeidai Barros, Cavalcanti, Hajdu & Pinheiro, 2023
- Lissodendoryx (Waldoschmittia) hawaiiana (de Laubenfels, 1950)
- Lissodendoryx (Waldoschmittia) mediterranea (Sarà & Siribelli, 1960)
- Lissodendoryx (Waldoschmittia) schmidti (Ridley, 1884)
