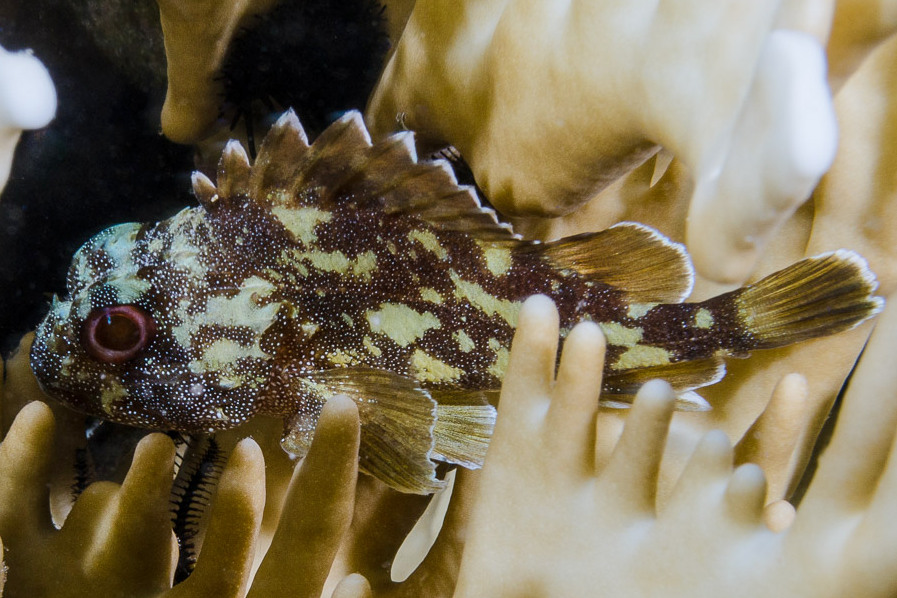

Conservation status
- Least Concern (IUCN 3.1)

Scientific classification
- Kingdom: Animalia
- Phylum: Chordata
- Class: Actinopterygii
- Division: Teleostei
- Order: Perciformes
- Family: Scorpaenidae
- Genus: Sebastapistes
- Species: S. cyanostigma

Binomial name
- Sebastapistes cyanostigma (Bleeker, 1856)

Synonyms
- Scorpaena cyanostigma Bleeker, 1856; Scorpaena albobrunnea Günther, 1874; Sebastapistes albobrunnea (Günther, 1874); Scorpaena kowiensis Smith, 1935; Sebastapistes kowiensis (Smith, 1935)

= Sebastapistes cyanostigma =

Species of fish

Sebastapistes cyanostigma, the yellowspotted scorpionfish, coral scorpionfish or pink and yellow scorpionfish, is a species of marine ray-finned fish belonging to the family Scorpaenidae, the scorpionfishes. It is found in the Indo-Pacific. It occasionally makes its way into the aquarium trade. It grows to 10 cm in length.

== Taxonomy ==
Sebastapistes cyanostigma was first formally described in 1856 as Scorpaena cyanostigma by the Dutch physician, herpetologist and ichthyologist Pieter Bleeker with the type locality given as Kajeli on Buru, one of the Molucca Islands in Indonesia. The specific name cyanostigma is a compound of cyano, which means "blue", and stigma, meaning "mark" or "spot", an allusion to the pearly or light-blue spots on the body.

== Description ==
Sebastapistes cyanostigma has 12 spines and 9 or 10 soft rays in the dorsal fin and 3 spines and 5 or 6 soft rays in the anal fin. The maximum published standard length of 10 cm (3.9 in). although 6.4 cm (2.5 in) is more typical for this small scorpionfish. The overall colour is pinkish to reddish with numerous very small whitish spots and large yellow blotches with yellowish fins.

== Distribution and habitat ==
Sebastapistes cyanostigma has a wide Indo-Pacific distribution, from the Red Sea and the eastern coast of Africa as far south as South Africa east through the coasts and islands of the Indian and Pacific Oceans as far east as Tonga, north to southern Japan and south to northern Australia. In Australian waters it is found at the offshore reefs of north Western Australia, Ashmore Reef in the Timor Sea, and the far north of the Great Barrier Reef and other reefs in the Coral Sea as far south as North Stradbroke Island in Queensland, as well as at Christmas Island and the Cocos (Keeling) Islands. It is found in shallow waters at depths between 2 and 30 m (6 ft 7 in and 98 ft 5 in) on reef crests with rich growths of coral in surge areas.

== Biology ==
Sebastapistes cyanostigma is a nocturnal ambush predator. In the day they hide mostly within the heads of corals in the genus Pocillopora, emerging at night to place themselves in a suitable site from which to ambush passing prey. They are frequently encountered in pairs or as small groups with the individual fish being separated by 10 to 20 cm (3.9 to 7.9 in). They feed on small fishes, crustaceans and zooplanktonic making short darts forward to capture prey and rarely leave the shelter of the reef to avoid predation. They are probably oviparous, like other closely related scorpionfishes, with the females releasing the internally fertilised egg which float near the surface. The observations of small groups in the Spring may be a mating behaviour. It van also be found around fire corals in the genera Millepora and Stylophora. The species has venomous fin spines. The prey is engulfed in the relatively large mouth.

== Utilisation ==
Sebastapistes cyanostigma is rare in the aquarium trade.
