= Calyx shackletoni =

Scientific classification
- Kingdom: Animalia
- Phylum: Porifera
- Class: Demospongiae
- Order: Haplosclerida
- Family: Phloeodictyidae
- Genus: Calyx
- Species: C. shackletoni

Binomial name
- Calyx shackletoni Goodwin, Brewin & Brickle, 2012

Species of sponge

Calyx shackletoni is a species of sea sponge first found on the coast of South Georgia island, in the south-western Southern Ocean.
