= Sebastapistes galactacma =

Scientific classification
- Kingdom: Animalia
- Phylum: Chordata
- Class: Actinopterygii
- Division: Teleostei
- Order: Perciformes
- Family: Scorpaenidae
- Genus: Sebastapistes
- Species: S. galactacma

Binomial name
- Sebastapistes galactacma Jenkins, 1903

Species of fish

Sebastapistes galactacma, commonly known as the milky scorpionfish, is a species of scorpionfish found in the tropical Pacific. The name Sebastapistes conveys a sense of caution and respect as it hints towards the venomous nature of the scorpionfish. The name of this genus stems from the Greek language. It is a compound word of the terms sebastes, which translates into "august" or "venerable", and apistia, which means "distrust".

== Description ==
The milky scorpionfish (Sebastapistes galactacma) is distinguishable by its reddish base color and numerous white dots densely distributed on its body. The first description of the fish was made by ichthyologist Oliver P. Jenkins, who described the resemblance of the scorpionfish's white dots to the stars in the Milky Way. This led Jenkins to name the species galactacma, which uses a variant of the Greek word "galactos," that translates to "milky," as a base for the species name.

Like other species of scorpionfish, S. galactacma is distinguishable by two spines connected to a lacrimal bone, a small bone structure that forms part of the fish's eye socket. Milky scorpionfish grow to be around 1in-3in and can have either cycloid or emarginate scales. It is worth noting that only members of this species in Micronesia have emarginate scales. Cycloid scales on the scorpionfish are smooth-edged and round/oval-shaped. In contrast, emarginate scales are slightly indented and notched.

== Distribution and habitat ==
Milky scorpionfish are found in Central Pacific waters and are commonly found in Hawaiʻi, Rapa Nui, Pohnpei, and Guam. This species is known to be a reef-dwelling fish that inhabits sections of the reef facing the open ocean. They are also described as benthic organisms, meaning they live on or near the seafloor, and occupy rubble areas and corals. The exact range of depth of milky scorpionfishes is not known because of their cryptobenthic nature. But based on the available data on this species, their estimated range of depth is between 4 m (13 ft) and 200 m (656 ft).

=== Hawaiian Population ===
Surveys of bays in Hawaiʻi have given insight into the possible population density of milky scorpionfish in the state. In Hawaiʻi, they tend to reside in rubble habitats and a small, branching coral called Pocillopora meandrina, commonly known as cauliflower coral. In these habitats, the milky scorpionfish shares its coral habitat with the closely related species Sebastapistes coniorta.
