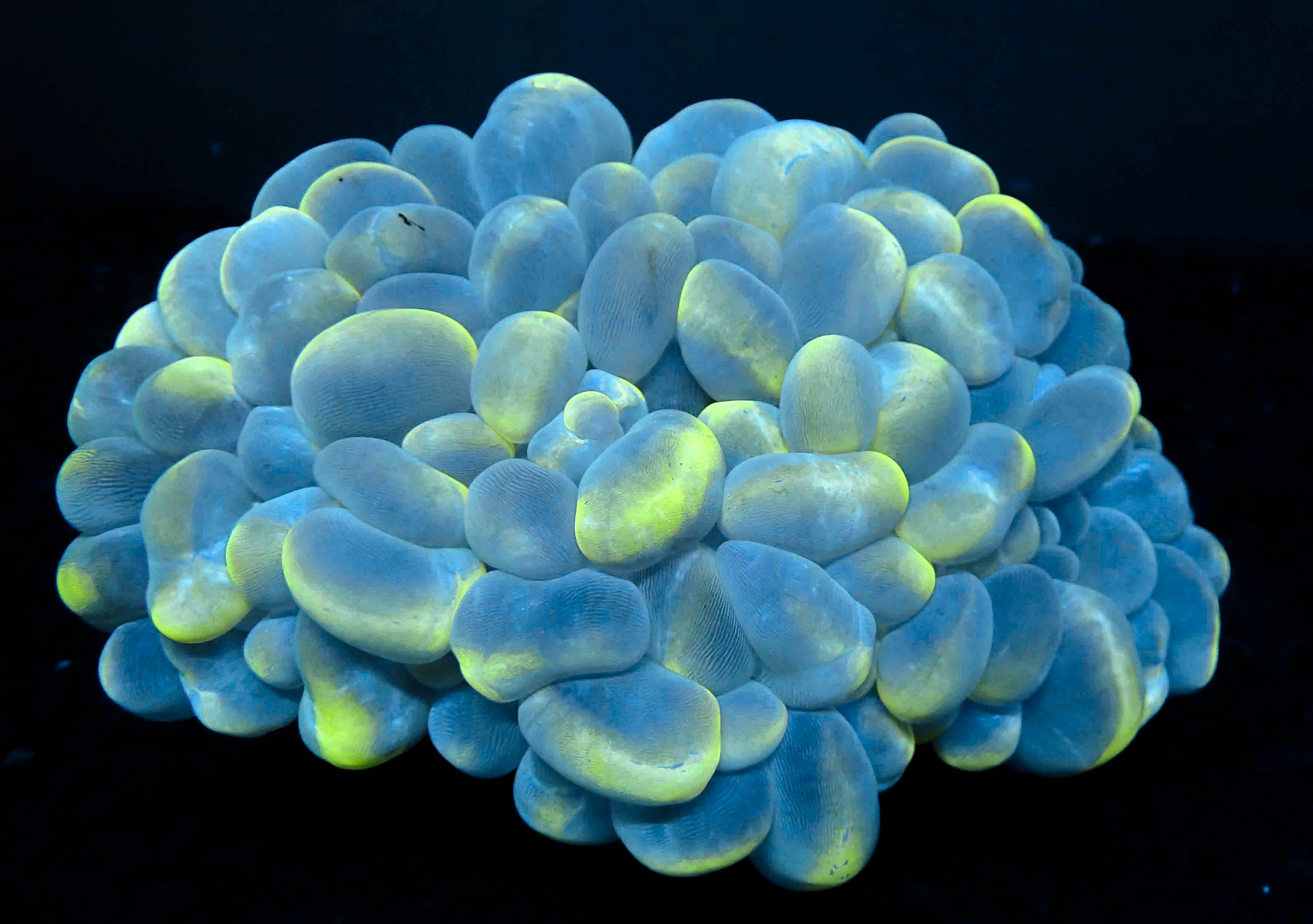

Conservation status
- Endangered (IUCN 3.1)

Scientific classification
- Kingdom: Animalia
- Phylum: Cnidaria
- Subphylum: Anthozoa
- Class: Hexacorallia
- Order: Scleractinia
- Family: Pocilloporidae
- Genus: Seriatopora
- Species: S. guttata

Binomial name
- Seriatopora guttata Veron, 2000

Synonyms
- Seriatopora guttatus Veron, 2000

= Seriatopora guttata =

Species of coral

Seriatopora guttata is a species of colonial stony coral in the family Pocilloporidae. It is native to the western Indo-Pacific region, its range extending from Madagascar and the Indian Ocean to the central Indo-Pacific, Australia, Indonesia and the south China Sea. It grows in shallow water on sheltered reef slopes, on vertical walls and under overhangs, at depths down to about 40 metres (130 ft). Although it is a common species, the International Union for Conservation of Nature has assessed its conservation status as being an Endangered species.
