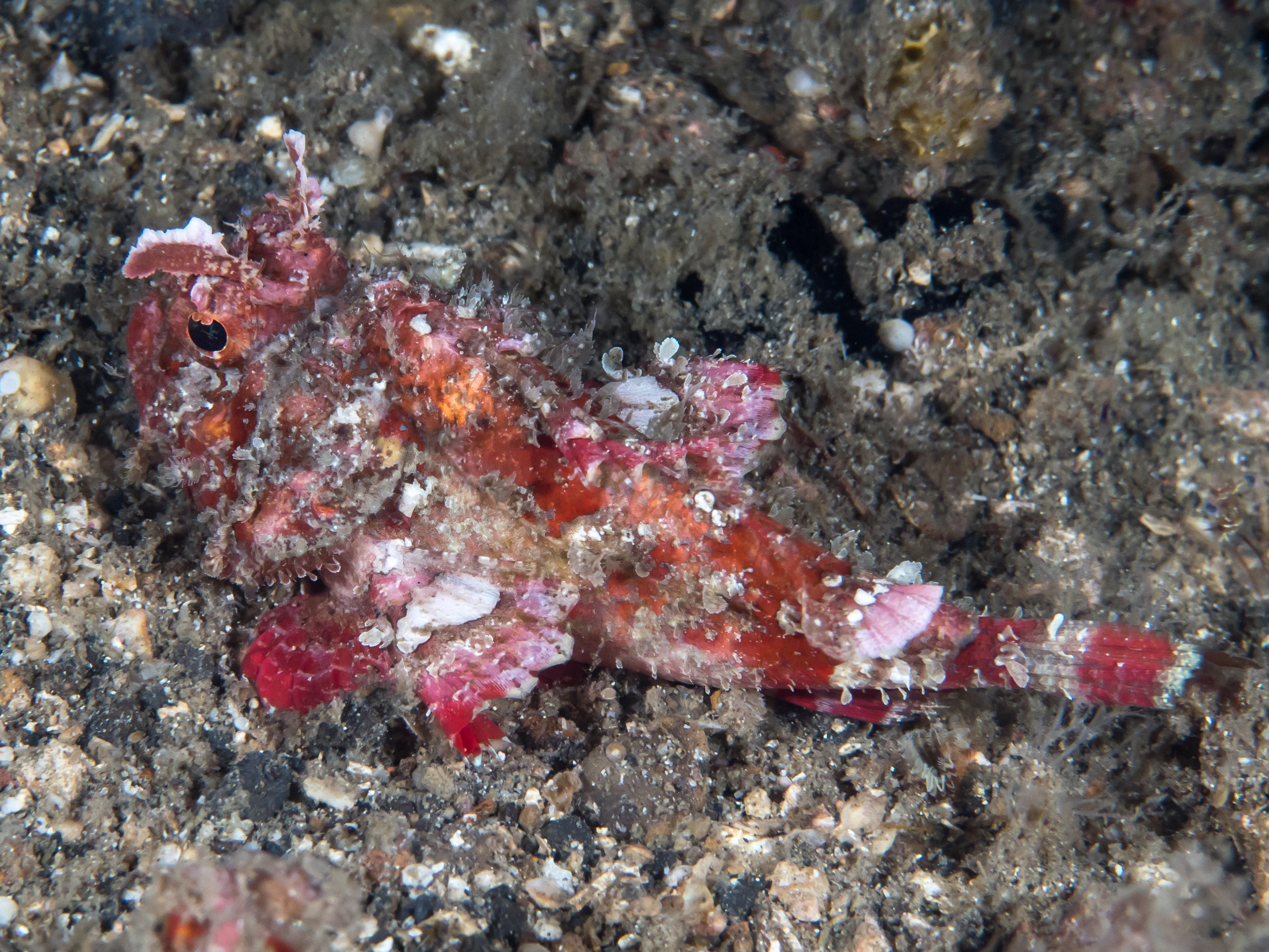

Scientific classification
- Kingdom: Animalia
- Phylum: Chordata
- Class: Actinopterygii
- Order: Perciformes
- Family: Scorpaenidae
- Genus: Sebastapistes
- Species: S. fowleri

Binomial name
- Sebastapistes fowleri (Pietschmann, 1934)

= Sebastapistes fowleri =

Marine fish species

Sebastapistes fowleri is a species of marine fish in the family Scorpaenidae. Sebastapistes fowleri (common names: dwarf scorpionfish, pygmy scorpionfish, Fowler’s scorpionfish) is one of the smallest species in the family Scorpaenidae. It is found throughout the tropical Indo-Pacific region.

== Description ==
Sebastapistes fowleri is one of the tiniest scorpionfishes, measuring about 2–3 cm in standard length in published records and photographs. It is typically orange to red with speckled white and black markings, giving it a mottled appearance that blends well with coral and rubble. The species has proportionally large eyes and a somewhat flattened body adapted for camouflage within reef structures. Like other members of Scorpaenidae, Sebastapistes fowleri possesses venomous fin spines used for defense, and it is a small reef predator that feeds on tiny fishes and invertebrates.

== Distribution and habitat ==
Sebastapistes fowleri is found in the Indo-Pacific, ranging from the western Indian Ocean (including Mauritius) to Okinawa, Hawai‘i, and the Pitcairn Islands. It typically inhabits coral reef environments at scuba-diving depths, especially areas with cauliflower coral or mixed sand-and-rubble substrates. Museum records and faunal surveys also document isolated southern range extensions into the Tasman Sea off eastern Australia.
