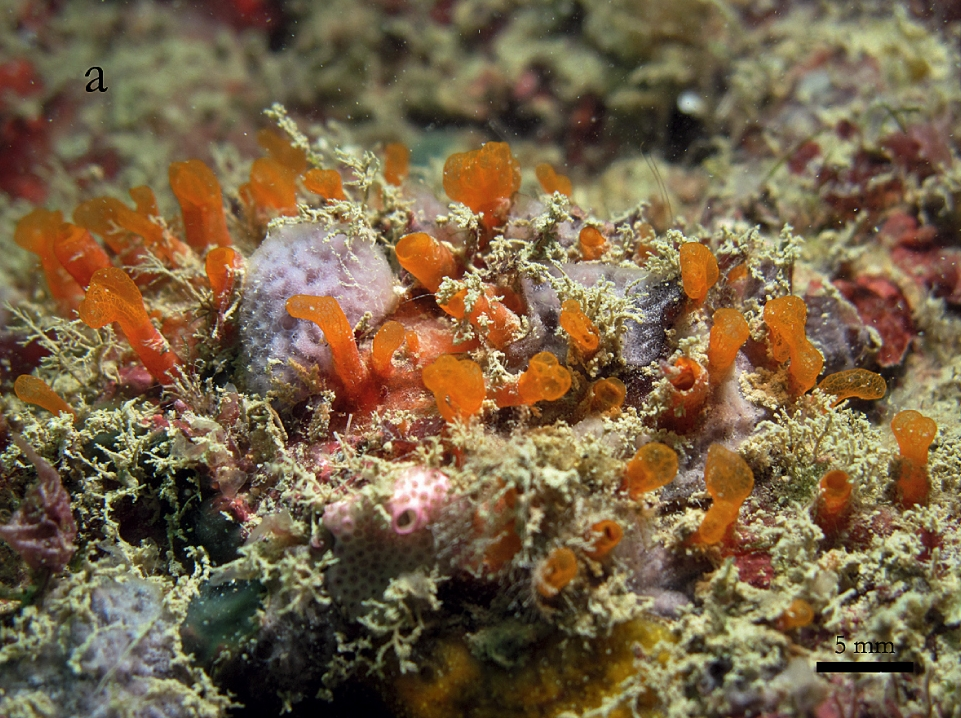
- Forcepia vansoesti

Scientific classification
- Domain: Eukaryota
- Kingdom: Animalia
- Phylum: Porifera
- Class: Demospongiae
- Order: Poecilosclerida
- Family: Coelosphaeridae
- Genus: Forcepia; Carter, 1874

= Forcepia =

Genus of sponges

Forcepia is a genus of sponges belonging to the family Coelosphaeridae.

The genus has cosmopolitan distribution.

== Species ==
Species from this genus are divided into two subgenera.

- Subgenus Forcepia:

- Forcepia agglutinans Burton, 1933
- Forcepia arenosa Hentschel, 1933
- Forcepia azorica Lundbeck, 1905
- Forcepia biceps (Carter, 1886)
- Forcepia colonensis Carter, 1874
- Forcepia crassanchorata Carter, 1885
- Forcepia dendyi van Soest & Hooper, 2020
- Forcepia elvini Lee, 2001
- Forcepia fabricans Schmidt, 1874
- Forcepia fistulosa van Soest, 2009
- Forcepia forcipis (Bowerbank, 1866)
- Forcepia foresti Lévi & Lévi, 1989
- Forcepia fragilis Stephens, 1917
- Forcepia grandisigmata van Soest, 1984
- Forcepia groenlandica Fristedt, 1887
- Forcepia hartmani Lee, 2001
- Forcepia hymena (de Laubenfels, 1930)
- Forcepia imperfecta Topsent, 1904
- Forcepia japonica Koltun, 1959
- Forcepia koltuni Lévi & Lévi, 1989
- Forcepia lissa (de Laubenfels, 1954)
- Forcepia lundbecki van Soest & Hooper, 2020
- Forcepia macrostylosa Lee, 2001
- Forcepia mertoni Hentschel, 1912
- Forcepia minima van Soest, 2009
- Forcepia psammophila (Cabioch, 1968)
- Forcepia solustylota Hoshino, 1977
- Forcepia stephensi Dendy, 1922
- Forcepia thielei Lundbeck, 1905
- Forcepia topsentii Lundbeck, 1905
- Forcepia toxafera Cárdenas & Rapp, 2015
- Forcepia trilabis (Boury-Esnault, 1973)
- Forcepia vansoesti Lim, de Voogd, & Tan, 2012
- Forcepia volsella Topsent, 1928

- Subgenus Leptolabis:

- Forcepia acanthostylosa Lee, 2001
- Forcepia apuliae (Sarà, 1969)
- Forcepia assimilis (Lundbeck, 1910)
- Forcepia australis (Lévi, 1963)
- Forcepia bilabifera (Burton, 1935)
- Forcepia brunnea (Topsent, 1904)
- Forcepia convergens (Topsent, 1928)
- Forcepia dentifera (Topsent, 1927)
- Forcepia forcipula (Topsent, 1904)
- Forcepia irritans (Thiele, 1905)
- Forcepia luciensis (Topsent, 1888)
- Forcepia megachela (Maldonado, 1992)
- Forcepia microlabis van Soest, 2009
- Forcepia pustula (Fristedt, 1887)
- Forcepia tenuissima (Hentschel, 1911)
- Forcepia uschakowi (Burton, 1935)
- Forcepia vermicola Lehnert & van Soest, 1996
