= Calyx (sponge) =

Scientific classification
- Kingdom: Animalia
- Phylum: Porifera
- Class: Demospongiae
- Order: Haplosclerida
- Family: Phloeodictyidae
- Genus: Calyx; Vosmaer, 1885

Synonyms
- Calyxabra De Laubenfels, 1949 (junior synonym); Lieberkuhnia Balsamo-Crivelli, 1863 (junior synonym); Vagocia Laubenfels, 1936 (junior synonym)

Genus of sponges

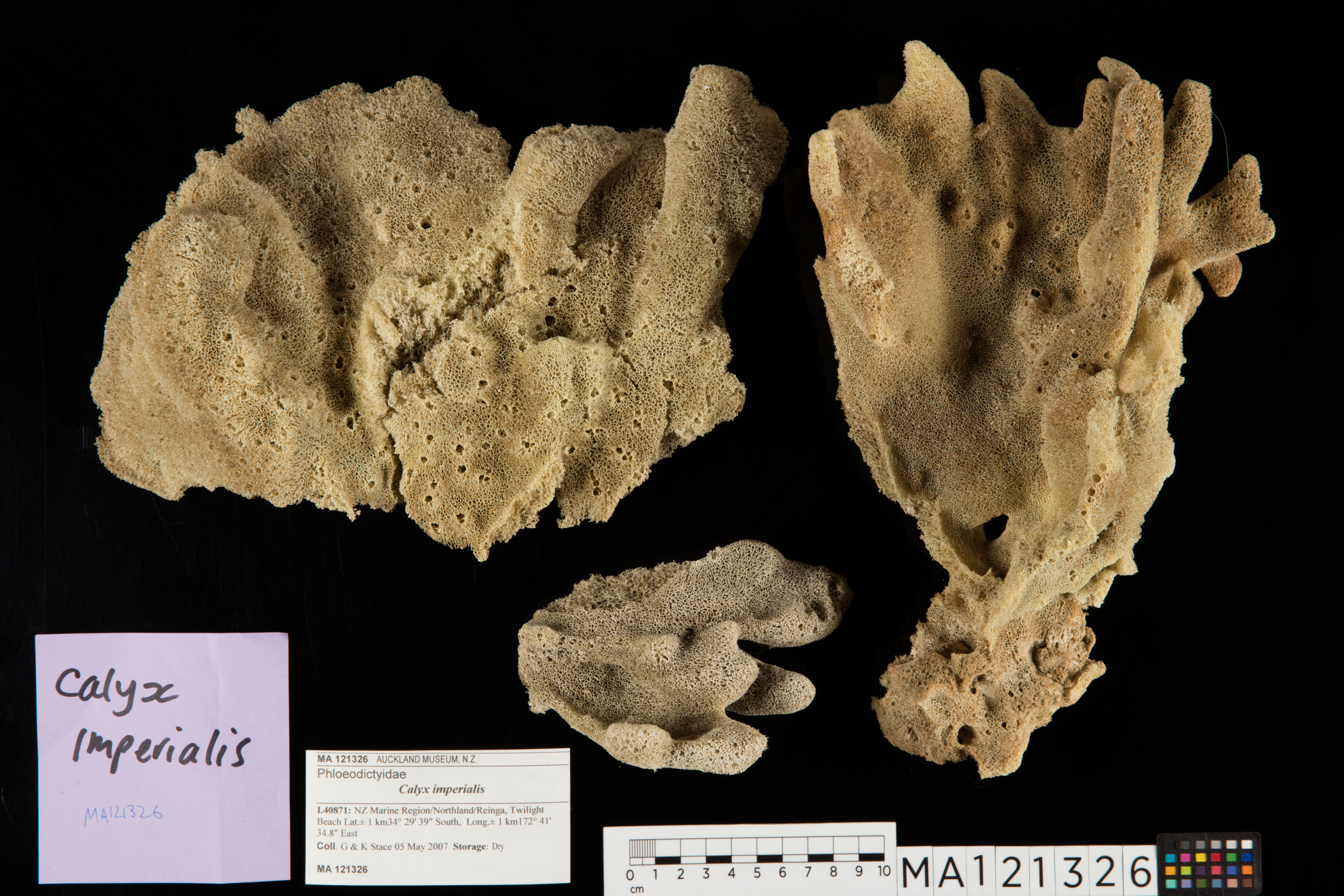
Specimen of Calyx imperialis found near Twilight Beach in Cape Reinga, New Zealand

Calyx is a genus of sea sponges of the family Phloeodictyidae.

== Species ==
Species accepted within Calyx:

- Calyx arcuarius (Topsent, 1913)
- Calyx clavata Burton, 1928
- Calyx imperialis (Dendy, 1924)
- Calyx infundibulum Pulitzer-Finali, 1993
- Calyx kerguelensis (Hentschel, 1914)
- Calyx magnoculata Van Soest, Meesters & Becking, 2014
- Calyx maya Gómez & Calderón-Gutiérrez, 2020
- Calyx nicaeensis (Risso, 1827)
- Calyx nyaliensis Pulitzer-Finali, 1993
- Calyx podatypa (Laubenfels, 1934)
- Calyx shackletoni Goodwin, Brewin & Brickle, 2012
- Calyx tufa (Ridley & Dendy, 1886)

Species brought into synonymy:

- Calyx nicaensis accepted as Calyx nicaeensis (Risso, 1827) (misspelling of species name)
- Calyx poa de Laubenfels, 1947 accepted as Halichondria poa (de Laubenfels, 1947) (genus transfer)
- Calyx santa (de Laubenfels, 1936) accepted as Neopetrosia carbonaria (Lamarck, 1814) (genus transfer and junior synonym)
- Calyx stipitatus Topsent, 1916 accepted as Calyx arcuarius (Topsent, 1913) (junior synonym)
