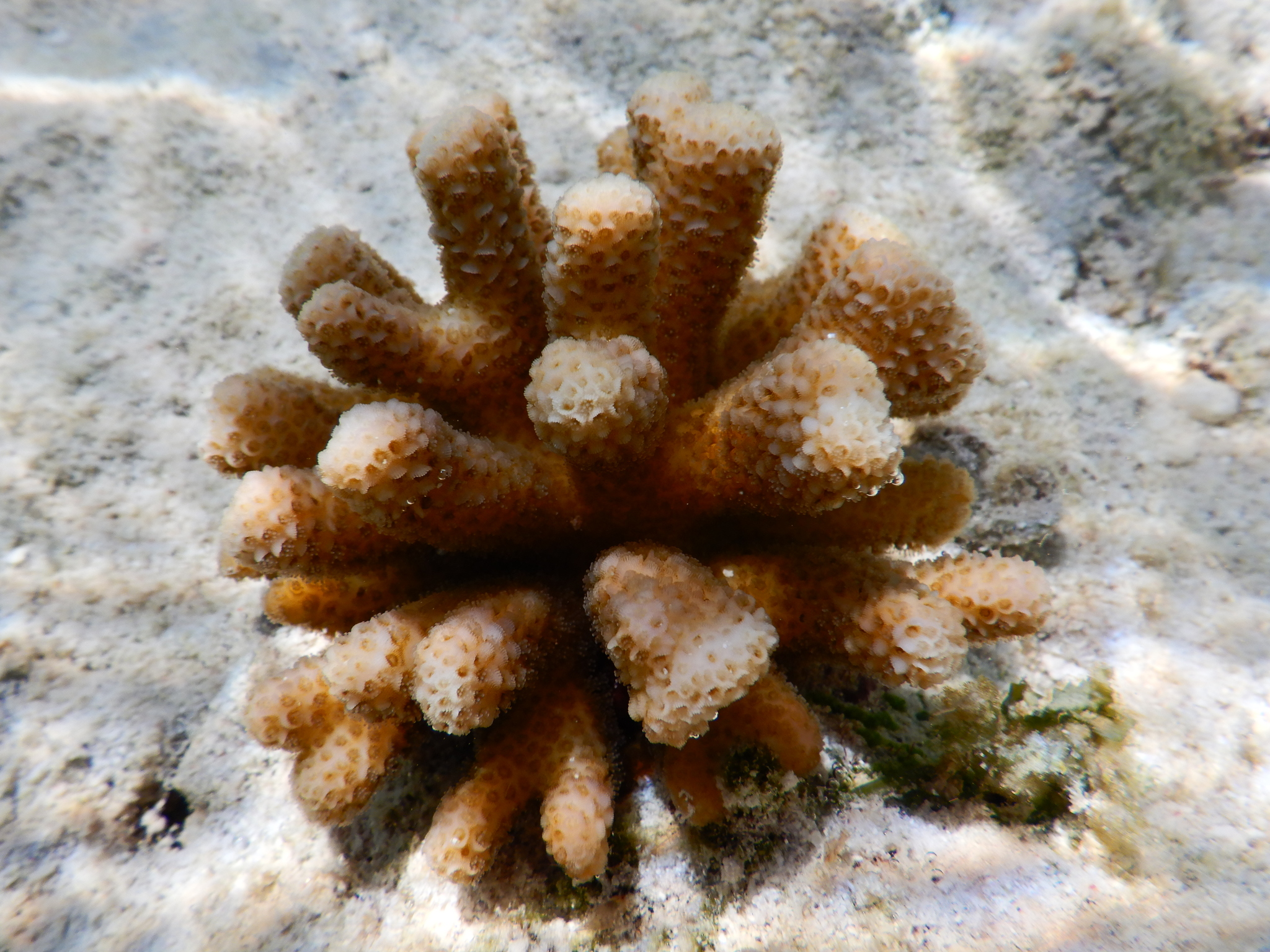

Conservation status
- Vulnerable (IUCN 3.1)

Scientific classification
- Kingdom: Animalia
- Phylum: Cnidaria
- Subphylum: Anthozoa
- Class: Hexacorallia
- Order: Scleractinia
- Family: Pocilloporidae
- Genus: Stylophora
- Species: S. madagascarensis

Binomial name
- Stylophora madagascarensis Veron, 2000

= Stylophora madagascarensis =

Species of coral

Stylophora madagascarensis is a species of stony coral in the family Pocilloporidae. It is native to the tropical western Indian Ocean where it is confined to the coasts of Madagascar, growing in shallow water.

== Description ==
Stylophora madagascarensis is a colonial species of coral forming clumps of slender, compact branches with blunt ends. The branches are up to five millimetres (0.20 in) in diameter. The corallites (stony cups in which the polyps sit) are crowded and circular, with those near the tips of the branches often being hooded. The corallites have six septa (stony plates forming the wall of the corallite) fused to a central, style-like columella. The coenosteum (the coral's stony skeleton) is covered with tiny spines. This is a zooxanthellate species of coral, the tissues of which harbour single-celled dinoflagellates living in symbiosis with the coral and providing it with nourishment. The polyps expand to feed at night and are retracted during the daytime. This coral is pale brown in colour, sometimes with pinkish bases to the branches.

== Distribution ==
This coral is endemic to the coasts of Madagascar. It grows in shallow water, both on moderately exposed reefs and in more sheltered lagoons, where it tends to have longer branches.

== Status ==
This species is common around the coasts of Madagascar but the International Union for Conservation of Nature has assessed its conservation status as "vulnerable". This is because the reefs around Madagascar are being degraded at such a rate that it is estimated that 45% of the habitat will be lost by 2050 (estimated to be three generations for corals). The chief threats faced by corals are associated with climate change, ocean acidification, increasing severity of storms and rising seawater temperatures, resulting in coral bleaching and an increased susceptibility of corals to disease. Its small total population size makes this coral more vulnerable to these threats than a more widespread species.
