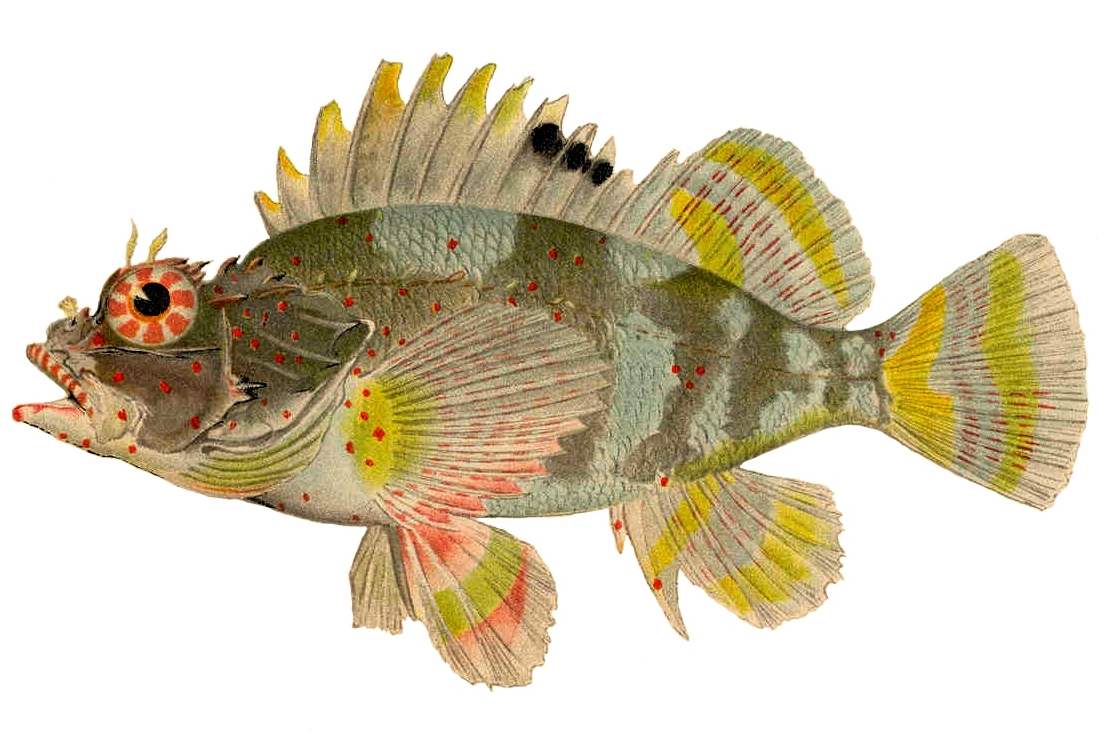

Conservation status
- Least Concern (IUCN 3.1)

Scientific classification
- Kingdom: Animalia
- Phylum: Chordata
- Class: Actinopterygii
- Division: Teleostei
- Order: Perciformes
- Family: Scorpaenidae
- Genus: Sebastapistes
- Species: S. ballieui

Binomial name
- Sebastapistes ballieui (Sauvage, 1875)

Synonyms
- Scorpaena ballieui Sauvage, 1875; Sebastapistes corallicola Jenkins, 1903

= Sebastapistes ballieui =

Species of fish

Sebastapistes ballieui, the spotfin scorpionfish, is a species of venomous marine ray-finned fish belonging to the family Scorpaenidae, the scorpionfishes. Sebastapistes ballieui is endemic to Hawaii.

== Etymology ==
The fish is named in honor of Pierre Étienne Théodore Ballieu (1828–1885), the French consul to the Sandwich Islands (Hawaiʻi). it was he who provided the Muséum national d'Histoire naturelle (Paris) with many Hawaiian specimens, including the type specimen of this one.

== Description ==
Sebastapistes ballieui has a rugged body with cranial spines bearing ridge thorns on its head, a feature typical of scorpionfishes. It has a recorded length of approximately 11.7 cm. The species possesses a venomous anatomy through the dorsal, anal, and pelvic fins, which functions as a defense mechanism against predators. The venom delivered through its dorsal spines can cause pain and swelling, serving as an effective strategy against potential predators.

It feeds primarily on small reef organisms, such as crustaceans and small fish functioning as a secondary consumer within the reef ecosystem. The species typically remains motionless on the seafloor while waiting to capture prey, relying on camouflage before striking at prey. The species is nocturnal, remaining hidden during the day and becoming more active at night when hunting for prey. Camouflage serves as both mechanism for protecting itself from predators and a strategy for ambush feeding. This strategy is common with other members of the family Scorpaenidae, which are ambush predators that rely on camouflage and sudden strike to capture prey. Furthermore, the fish exhibits cryptic coloration, often in shades of red, brown, and orange, allowing it to blend into the coral reef environment.

== Distribution and habitat ==
Sebastapistes ballieui is endemic to Hawaii, often on reef slopes and in areas with a unique complexity, specifically spur-and-groove formations. Scorpionfishes are benthic marine fishes that inhabits along rocky seafloor environments. In Kāneʻohe Bay, Oʻahu, it is commonly associated in rubble and coral substrates, enhancing its defense mechanism through camouflage against predators. The species is usually observed in shallow reef environments but may be found at moderate depths, depending on habitat availability. Its presence is strongly tied to the structure of the reef and the abundance of both habitat and prey.
