= Inflatella =

Scientific classification
- Kingdom: Animalia
- Phylum: Porifera
- Class: Demospongiae
- Order: Poecilosclerida
- Family: Coelosphaeridae
- Genus: Inflatella (Schmidt, 1875)

Synonyms
- Joyeuxia (Topsent, 1890)

Genus of sponges

Infantella is a genus of demosponges in the family Coelospharidae. The species in this genus differ from those in other genera through having a single kind of diactinal megascleres (single axis spicules with similar ends) and no mircoscleres. This genus contains 6 species.

== Species ==
The following species are recognised:

- Inflatella belli (Kirkpatrick, 1907), Gooseberry sponge
- Inflatella coelosphaeroides (Koltun, 1964)
- Inflatella globosa (Koltun, 1955)
- Inflatella pellicula (Schmidt, 1875)
- Inflatella tubulosa (Topsent, 1904)
- Inflatella viridis (Topsent, 1890)
