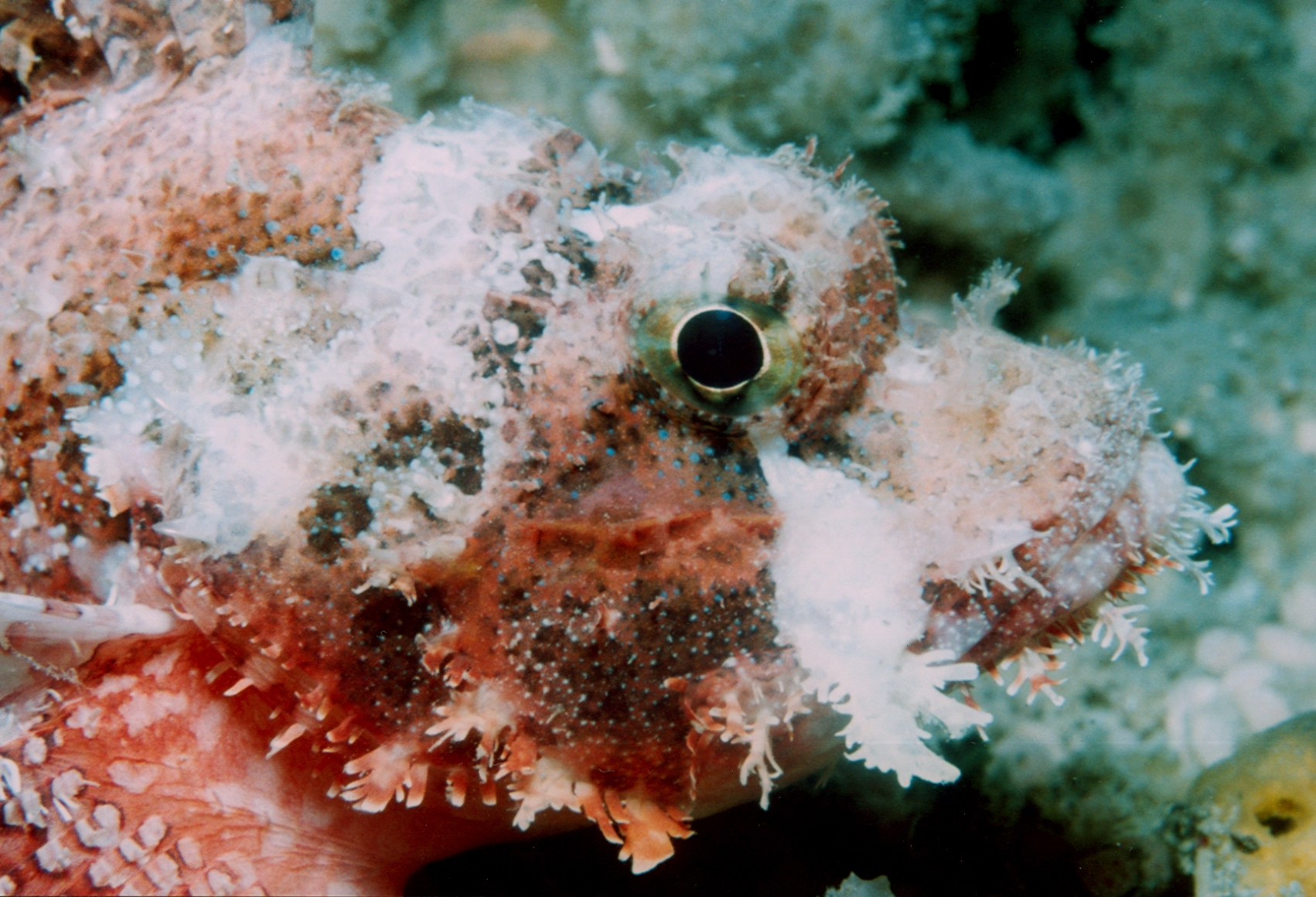
- Sebastapistes strongia

Scientific classification
- Kingdom: Animalia
- Phylum: Chordata
- Class: Actinopterygii
- Order: Perciformes
- Suborder: Scorpaenoidei
- Family: Scorpaenidae
- Subfamily: Scorpaeninae
- Genus: Sebastapistes; T. N. Gill, 1877

Type species
- Scorpaena strongia Cuvier, 1829

Synonyms
- Oligoscorpaena Fowler, 1939

= Sebastapistes =

Genus of fishes

Sebastapistes is a genus of marine ray-finned fish belonging to the family Scorpaenidae, the scorpionfishes. The fishes in this genus are found in the Indian and Pacific Ocean.

== Taxonomy ==
Sebastapistes was first described as a genus in 1877 by the American ichthyologist Theodore Gill, Gill included 3 species within the new genus and in 1898 David Starr Jordan and Barton Warren Evermann designated Scorpaena strongia which had been described by Georges Cuvier in 1829 with its type locality given as Kosrae in the Caroline Islands, as the type species. This genus is classified within the tribe Scorpaenini, in the subfamily Scorpaeninae of the family Scorpaenidae. The etymology of the genus name Sebastapistes was not explained by Gill, it may be that Sebast- is derived from Sebastichthys (a subgenus of Sebastes), which was previously a genus S. cyanostigma was classified in, or a reference to sebastin fishes in general; apistes is apistus which means "untrustworthy" or "perfidious", as these fishes are not a true rockfishes but are "intermediate between the Sebastoid and Scorpaenoid genera".

== Species ==
The 11 recognized species in this genus are:

- Sebastapistes ballieui (Sauvage, 1875) (Spotfin scorpionfish)
- Sebastapistes coniorta O. P. Jenkins, 1903 (Humpback nohu)
- Sebastapistes cyanostigma (Bleeker, 1856) (Yellowspotted scorpionfish)
- Sebastapistes fowleri (Pietschmann, 1934) (Pygmy scorpionfish)
- Sebastapistes galactacma O. P. Jenkins, 1903 (Galactacma scorpionfish)
- Sebastapistes mauritiana (Cuvier, 1829) (Spineblotch scorpionfish)

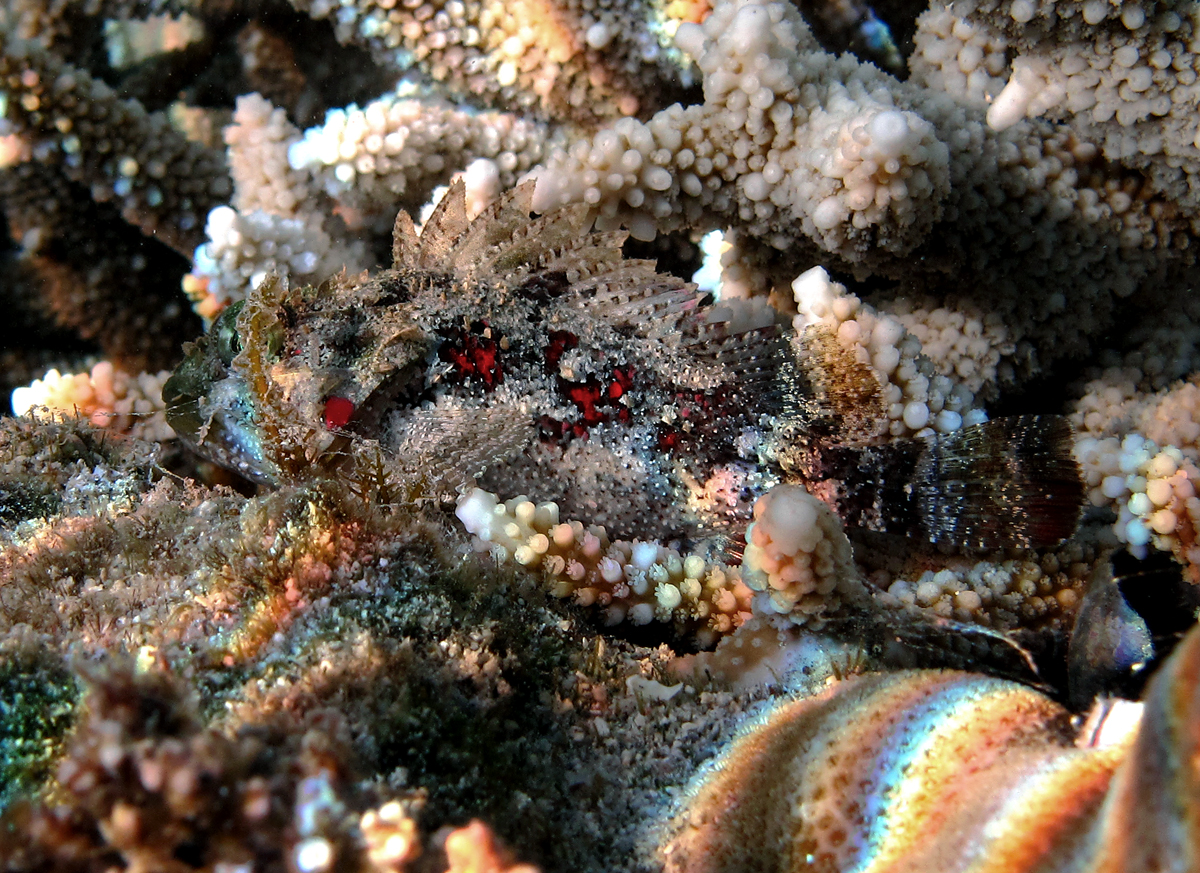
A spineblotch scorpionfish (Sebastapistes mauritiana).

- Sebastapistes nuchalis Günther, 1874
- Sebastapistes perplexa Motomura, Aizawa & Endo, 2014
- Sebastapistes strongia (G. Cuvier, 1829) (Barchin scorpionfish)
- Sebastapistes taeniophrys (Fowler, 1943)
- Sebastapistes tinkhami (Fowler, 1946) (Darkspotted scorpionfish)

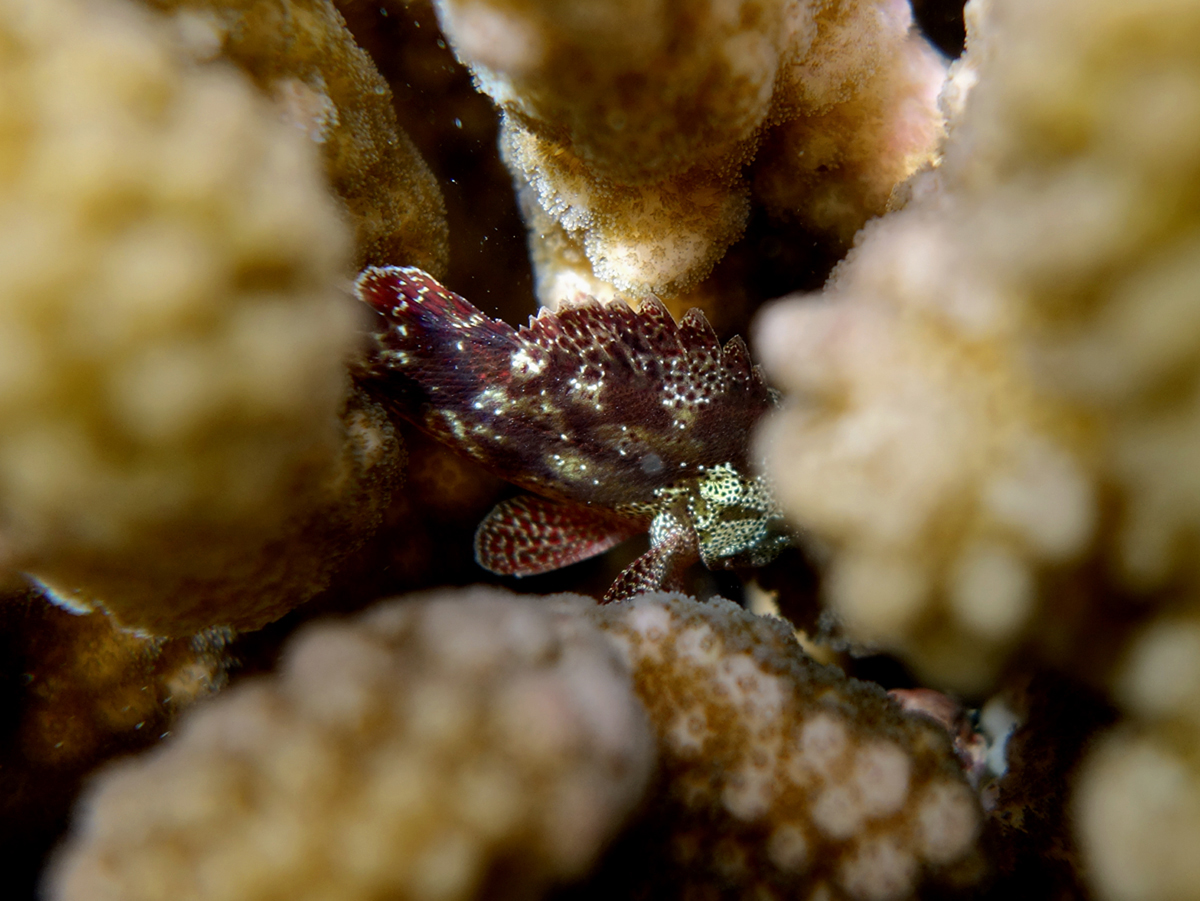
A darkspotted scorpionfish (Sebastapistes tinkhami).

Some authorities consider that S. nuchalis is a junior synonym of S. strongia and that Scorpaena pascuensis should be included within Sebastapistes.

== Characteristics ==
Sebastapistes scorpionfishes are characterised by there being 12 spines in the dorsal fin, having teeth on the palatine and byhaving the rear lacrimal spine being directed diagonally downwards. The pored scales in the lateral line continue on to the caudal peduncle and they do not have a deep occipital pit. There are species in the deepwater scorpionfish genus Neomerinthe which share these characteristics with this genus but have different patterns of spines and scales on their heads, differing meristics and by living in deep water. The size of these small scorpionfishes varies from a maximum published total length of 2.5 cm (0.98 in) in S. taeniophrys up to 11.7 cm (4.6 in) in S. ballieui.

== Distribution and habitat ==
Sebastapistes scorpionfishes are found in the Indian and Pacific Oceans from East Africa to Hawaii and Easter Island. They are mostly species of shallow, tropical coastal waters but two species S. strongia and S. perplexa extend to temperate waters off Japan.
