= Seriatopora stellata =

Conservation status
- Endangered (IUCN 3.1)

Scientific classification
- Kingdom: Animalia
- Phylum: Cnidaria
- Subphylum: Anthozoa
- Class: Hexacorallia
- Order: Scleractinia
- Family: Pocilloporidae
- Genus: Seriatopora
- Species: S. stellata

Binomial name
- Seriatopora stellata Quelch, 1886

Species of coral

Seriatopora stellata is a species of colonial stony coral in the family Pocilloporidae. It is native to the western Indo-Pacific region, its range extending from the central Indian Ocean to the central Indo-Pacific, northwestern Australia, Indonesia, Japan, the south China Sea and the oceanic island groups in the West Pacific. It grows in shallow water on sheltered reef slopes at depths down to about 20 metres (66 ft). It is a widespread but uncommon species and the International Union for Conservation of Nature has assessed its conservation status as being an endangered species.
