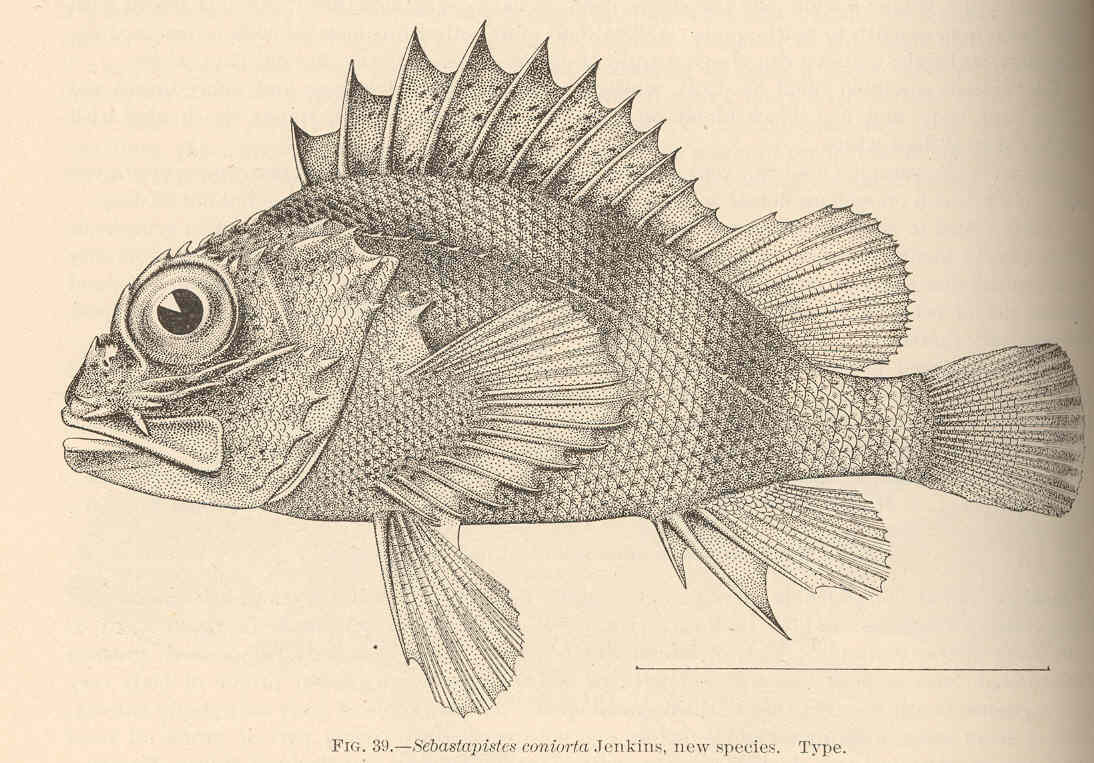

Conservation status
- Near Threatened (IUCN 3.1)

Scientific classification
- Kingdom: Animalia
- Phylum: Chordata
- Class: Actinopterygii
- Order: Perciformes
- Family: Scorpaenidae
- Genus: Sebastapistes
- Species: S. coniorta

Binomial name
- Sebastapistes coniorta O. P. Jenkins, 1903

= Sebastapistes coniorta =

Species of fish

Sebastapistes coniorta, commonly known as the humpback nohu or the speckled scorpionfish, is a species of scorpionfishes native to the Hawaiian Islands and Johnston Atoll.

== Description ==
Sebastapistes coniorta has 12 dorsal spines and nine dorsal soft rays, with three anal spines and five to six anal soft rays. Its body has a fusiform shape.

== Distribution and habitat ==
Sebastapistes coniorta is found in the tropical Eastern Central Pacific, such as the Hawaiian Islands and Johnston Island. It lives in reef-associated marine environments, often taking shelter among the branches of cauliflower coral during the day and feeding in and around corals at nighttime.
