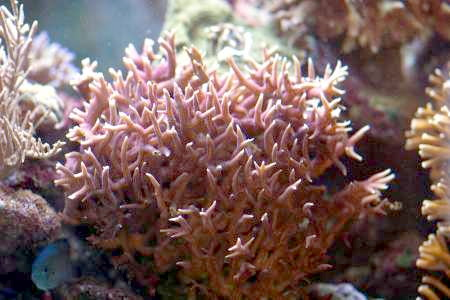
- Seriatopora hystrix, Type species

Scientific classification
- Kingdom: Animalia
- Phylum: Cnidaria
- Subphylum: Anthozoa
- Class: Hexacorallia
- Order: Scleractinia
- Family: Pocilloporidae
- Genus: Seriatopora; Lamarck, 1816

Species
- See text

= Seriatopora =

Genus of corals

Seriatopora is a genus of colonial stony corals in the family Pocilloporidae. They are commonly known as needle corals, birdsnest corals or finger corals. They are native to the Red Sea, the Indo-Pacific region and some parts of the Central Pacific Ocean.

== Characteristics ==
Members of this genus form small bushes with anastomising (linking) branches. The branch tips are sharply tapered and the growth forms are variable, depending on the level of light and the movement of water. The corallites are arranged in neat rows and the polyps only extend at night. The colour of these corals can be yellow, orange, pink, green or brown.

== Species ==
The following species are listed in the World Register of Marine Species (WoRMS):

- Seriatopora aculeata Quelch, 1886
- Seriatopora caliendrum Ehrenberg, 1834
- Seriatopora dendritica Veron, 2000
- Seriatopora guttata Veron, 2000
- Seriatopora hystrix Dana, 1846
- Seriatopora lineata (Linnaeus, 1758)
- Seriatopora octoptera Ehrenberg, 1834
- Seriatopora spinosa Milne Edwards, 1860
- Seriatopora stellata Quelch, 1886
