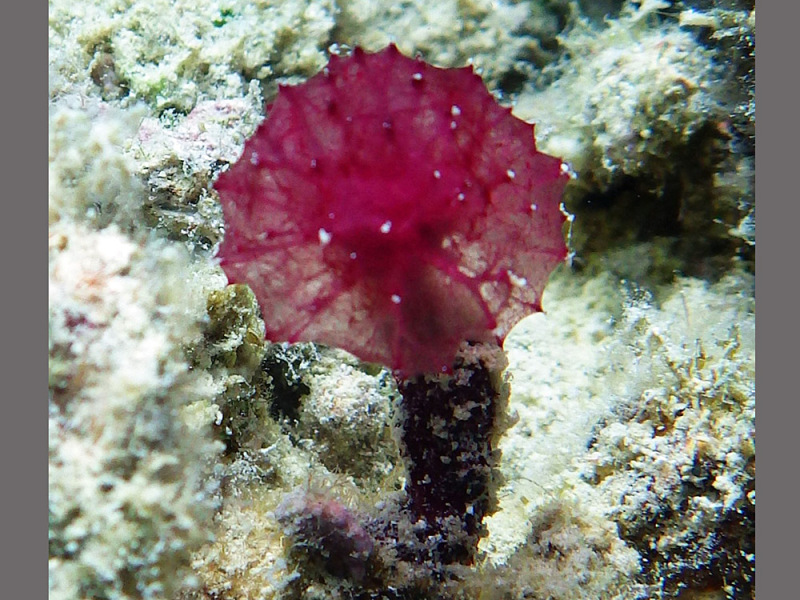
- Oceanapia sagittaria

Scientific classification
- Kingdom: Animalia
- Phylum: Porifera
- Class: Demospongiae
- Order: Haplosclerida
- Family: Phloeodictyidae
- Genus: Oceanapia; Norman, 1869

= Oceanapia =

Genus of sponges

Oceanapia is a genus of sponges belonging to the family Phloeodictyidae.

The genus has almost cosmopolitan distribution.

== Species ==
Species:

- Oceanapia aberrans (Dendy, 1924)
- Oceanapia abrolhosensis (Dendy & Frederick, 1924)
- Oceanapia aerea (Topsent, 1904)
- Oceanapia aliformis (Ridley, 1884)
- Oceanapia amboinensis Topsent, 1897
- Oceanapia arcifera Dendy, 1924
- Oceanapia arenosa Rao, 1941
- Oceanapia ascidia (Schmidt, 1870)
- Oceanapia atlantica Lévi, 1969
- Oceanapia azorensis Van Soest & Hooper, 2020
- Oceanapia bacillifera Wilson, 1904
- Oceanapia cagayanensis (Wilson, 1925)
- Oceanapia canalis (Ridley, 1884)
- Oceanapia cancap de Weerdt & van Soest, 1986
- Oceanapia carbonilla (de Laubenfels, 1954)
- Oceanapia carotta (Schmidt, 1870)
- Oceanapia cohaerens (Carter, 1886)
- Oceanapia constructa (Rützler, 1965)
- Oceanapia cordia Santos Neto, Nascimento, Cavalcanti & Pinheiro, 2018
- Oceanapia coriacea (Topsent, 1904)
- Oceanapia corticata (Whitelegge, 1901)
- Oceanapia crassispicula (Kieschnick, 1896)
- Oceanapia cribrirhina (Vacelet & Vasseur, 1971)
- Oceanapia decipiens (Sarà, 1958)
- Oceanapia desquefaundia Fromont, 1991
- Oceanapia dura (Vacelet & Vasseur, 1971)
- Oceanapia elastica (Keller, 1891)
- Oceanapia elongata (Topsent, 1892)
- Oceanapia enigmatica (Sarà, 1978)
- Oceanapia eumita (Kirkpatrick, 1903)
- Oceanapia eusiphonia (Ridley, 1884)
- Oceanapia exigua Pulitzer-Finali, 1993
- Oceanapia fibulata (Schmidt, 1880)
- Oceanapia fistulosa (Bowerbank, 1873)
- Oceanapia flava Ott, McDaniel & Humphrey, 2024
- Oceanapia fragilis Topsent, 1897
- Oceanapia fuliginosa (Carter, 1882)
- Oceanapia globosa Pulitzer-Finali, 1993
- Oceanapia guaiteca Hajdu, Desqueyroux-Faúndez, Carvalho, Lôbo-Hajdu & Willenz, 2013
- Oceanapia hechteli Santos Neto, Nascimento, Cavalcanti & Pinheiro, 2018
- Oceanapia hondurasensis (Carter, 1882)
- Oceanapia imperfecta Dendy, 1895
- Oceanapia incrustata (Dendy, 1922)
- Oceanapia integra (Topsent, 1897)
- Oceanapia irregularis (Lundbeck, 1902)
- Oceanapia isodictyiformis (Carter, 1882)
- Oceanapia macrotoxa (Hooper, 1984)
- Oceanapia magna Santos Neto, Nascimento, Cavalcanti & Pinheiro, 2018
- Oceanapia media (Thiele, 1899)
- Oceanapia microtoxa Desqueyroux-Faúndez & van Soest, 1997
- Oceanapia minor (Sarà, 1958)
- Oceanapia minuta (Vacelet, Vasseur & Lévi, 1976)
- Oceanapia mollis Dendy, 1895
- Oceanapia mucronata (Vacelet, Vasseur & Lévi, 1976)
- Oceanapia niduliformis (Carter, 1882)
- Oceanapia nodosa (George & Wilson, 1919)
- Oceanapia nodulosa (Topsent, 1928)
- Oceanapia oleracea (Schmidt, 1870)
- Oceanapia ooita (Hoshino, 1981)
- Oceanapia pacifica (Dickinson, 1945)
- Oceanapia papula Desqueyroux-Faúndez, 1987
- Oceanapia pedunculata (Ridley & Dendy, 1886)
- Oceanapia pellucida (Ridley, 1884)
- Oceanapia peltata (Schmidt, 1870)
- Oceanapia penicilliformis (van Soest & Sass, 1981)
- Oceanapia perforata (Sarà, 1960)
- Oceanapia perlucida (Desqueyroux-Faúndez, 1987)
- Oceanapia petrosia (Lendenfeld, 1888)
- Oceanapia phillipensis Dendy, 1895
- Oceanapia pinella (de Laubenfels, 1954)
- Oceanapia polysiphonia (Dendy, 1922)
- Oceanapia polytuba Ott, McDaniel & Humphrey, 2024
- Oceanapia porosa (Dendy, 1922)
- Oceanapia putridosa (Lamarck, 1815)
- Oceanapia ramsayi (Lendenfeld, 1888)
- Oceanapia renieroides Burton, 1934
- Oceanapia reticulata (Topsent, 1904)
- Oceanapia robusta (Bowerbank, 1866)
- Oceanapia sagittaria (Sollas, 1902)
- Oceanapia sessilis (Kirkpatrick, 1900)
- Oceanapia seychellensis (Dendy, 1922)
- Oceanapia spathulifera (Ridley, 1884)
- Oceanapia spinisphaera Hajdu, Desqueyroux-Faúndez, Carvalho, Lôbo-Hajdu & Willenz, 2013
- Oceanapia stalagmitica (Wiedenmayer, 1977)
- Oceanapia tenuis Desqueyroux-Faúndez, 1987
- Oceanapia topsenti Santos Neto, Nascimento, Cavalcanti & Pinheiro, 2018
- Oceanapia toxonisimilis (Hoshino, 1981)
- Oceanapia toxophila Dendy, 1922
- Oceanapia triangulata (Desqueyroux-Faúndez, 1987)
- Oceanapia tuber (Lundbeck, 1902)
- Oceanapia vacua (Sarà, 1961)
- Oceanapia vera (Lévi, 1993)
- Oceanapia zoologica (Dendy, 1905)
