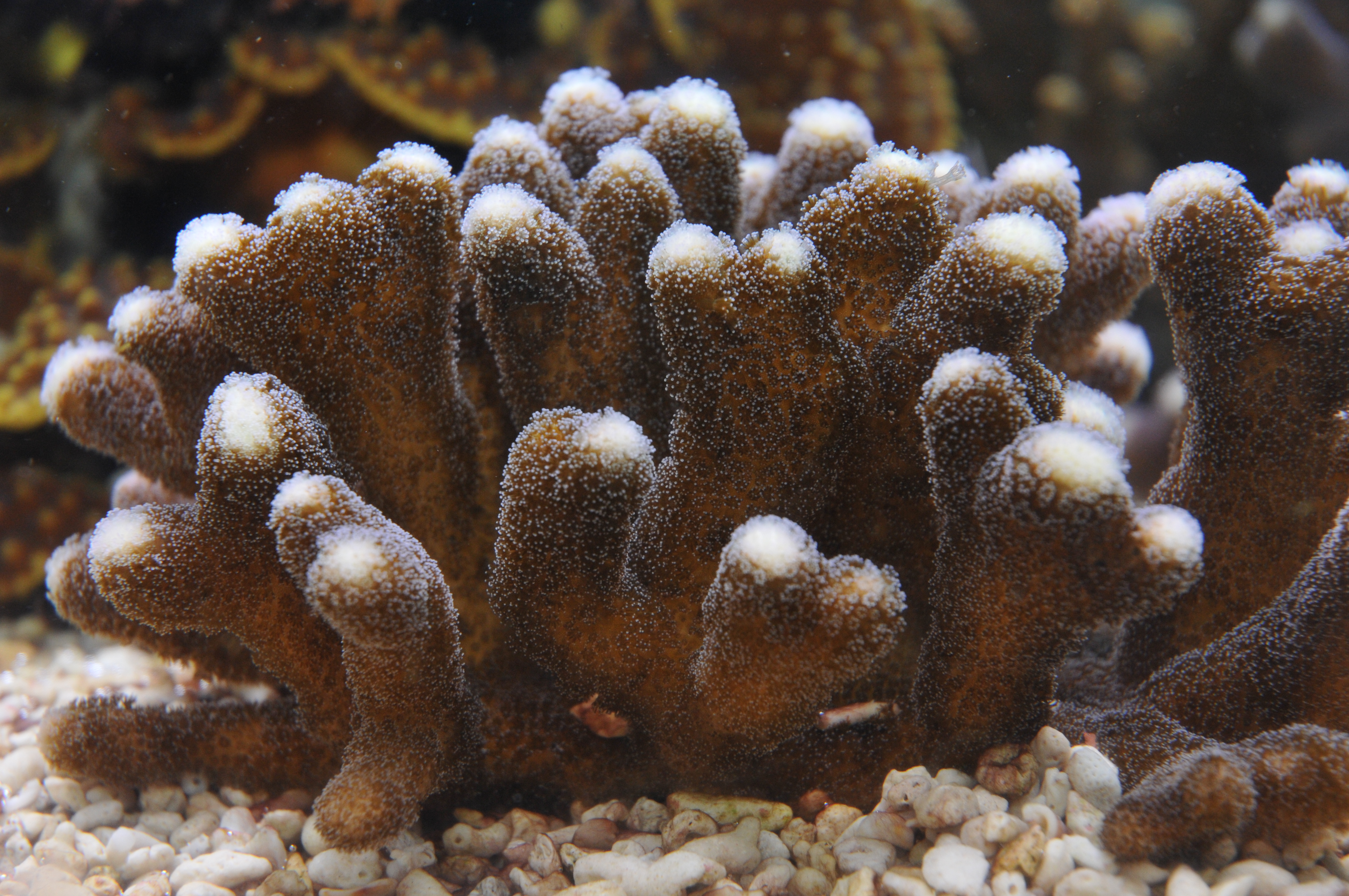

Conservation status
- Near Threatened (IUCN 3.1)

Scientific classification
- Kingdom: Animalia
- Phylum: Cnidaria
- Subphylum: Anthozoa
- Class: Hexacorallia
- Order: Scleractinia
- Family: Pocilloporidae
- Genus: Stylophora
- Species: S. pistillata

Binomial name
- Stylophora pistillata Esper, 1797

Synonyms
- List: Madrepora pistillaris Esper, 1797; Pocillopora andreossyi Audouin, 1826; Porites pistillata (Esper, 1797); Porites subdigitata Lamarck, 1816; Sideropora mordax Dana, 1846; Sideropora pistillata (Esper, 1797); Sideropora subdigitata (Lamarck, 1816); Stylophora cellulosa Quelch, 1886; Stylophora dendritica Nemenzo, 1964; Stylophora digitata (Pallas, 1766); Stylophora expanda Nemenzo, 1964; Stylophora mordax (Dana, 1846); Stylophora nana Nemenzo, 1964; Stylophora palmata de Blainville, 1830; Stylophora pistillaris (Esper, 1797); Stylophora prostrata Klunzinger, 1879; Stylophora septata Gardiner, 1898; Stylophora sinaitica Brüggemann, 1877; Stylophora stellata Verrill, 1864

= Stylophora pistillata =

Species of coral

Stylophora pistillata, commonly known as hood coral or smooth cauliflower coral, is a species of stony coral in the family Pocilloporidae. It is native to the Indo-Pacific region and is commonly used in scientific investigations.

== Description ==
Stylophora pistillata has broad, blunt-ended branches, and colonies become thicker and more submassive as they grow. The maximum diameter of a colony is about 30 cm (12 in). The corallites (stony cups from which the polyps emerge) are conical or hooded and are sunk beneath the general surface. The columella (central column of the corallite) is solid and prominent, and the septa (stony plates forming the corallite wall) may be fused to the columella. There are six primary septa and sometimes six secondary ones. Colonies can be cream, pink, bluish or green.

== Distribution ==
Stylophora pistillata is widely distributed in the tropical and subtropical Indo-Pacific region. Its range extends from Madagascar, East Africa, the Red Sea and the Persian Gulf, through the Indian Ocean to northern Australia, Indonesia, the Philippines, New Guinea, Japan and many island groups in the western and central Pacific Ocean. It is a reef-building species and favours exposed habitats with strong water movement. Its depth range is down to about 15 m (50 ft).

== Ecology ==
This coral provides a home to gall crabs, Trapezia crabs, boring clams, date mussels, barnacles, Christmas tree worms and damselfish. Some, such as the date mussels, are parasites that bore into the coral structure and weaken the coral skeleton. However, boring clams bring fresh, oxygenated water into the colony which benefits the coral.

== Status ==
The chief threats faced by corals in general are climate change, with its associated sea temperature rise and increase in violent storms, and habitat destruction, as well as an increase in ocean acidification and an increasing susceptibility to coral diseases. Stylophora pistillata is prone to coral bleaching, a condition in which corals force out the beneficial zooxanthellae from their tissues and become white and liable to die. However, this is a common species of coral with a wide distribution and may be more resilient than some less widespread coral species. It is collected for the reef aquarium trade, with about 10,000 pieces being exported in 2005. The International Union for Conservation of Nature has assessed its conservation status as being "near threatened".
