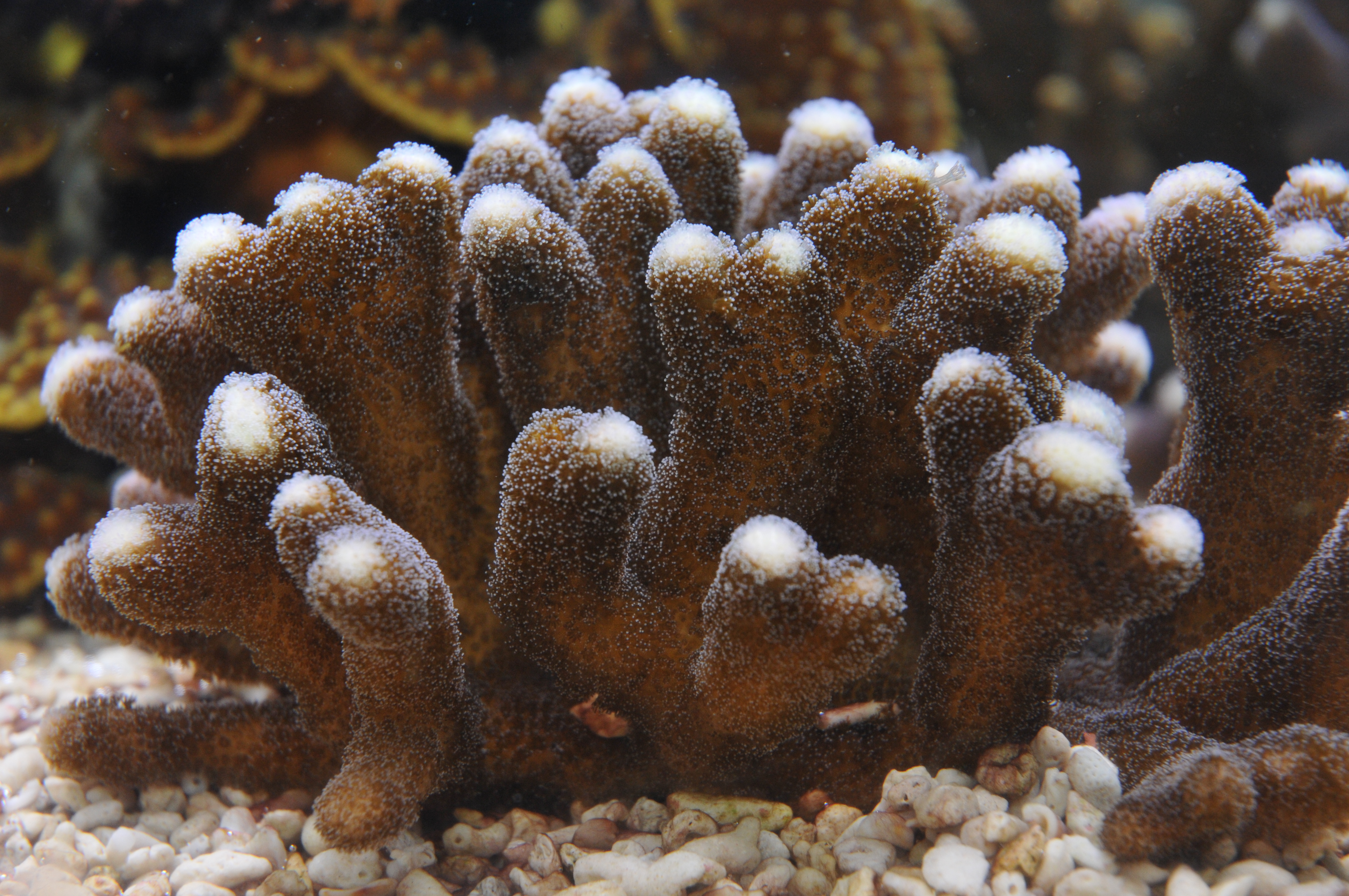
- Stylophora pistillata

Scientific classification
- Kingdom: Animalia
- Phylum: Cnidaria
- Subphylum: Anthozoa
- Class: Hexacorallia
- Order: Scleractinia
- Family: Pocilloporidae
- Genus: Stylophora; Schweigger, 1820

Species
- See text

Synonyms
- Sideropora Blainville, 1830

= Stylophora (coral) =

Genus of corals

Stylophora[Eg. Milka Stylo] is a genus of colonial stony corals in the family Pocilloporidae. They are commonly known as cat's paw corals or birdsnest corals. They are native to the Red Sea, the Indo-Pacific region and eastwards as far as the Pitcairn Islands.

== Characteristics ==
Members of this genus are branching corals. The finger-like branches vary in width and have blunt tips. The growth forms and colours are variable depending on many factors, including the level of light and the amount of water movement. The colour may be orange, pink, magenta, purple, green or brown.

== Species ==
The following species are listed in the World Register of Marine Species (WoRMS):

- †Stylophora confusa Duncan, 1880
- Stylophora danae Milne Edwards & Haime, 1850
- Stylophora erythraea Von Marenzeller, 1907
- Stylophora flabellata Quelch, 1886
- †Stylophora gigas Hoffmeister, 1945
- †Stylophora granulata Duncan & Wall, 1865
- Stylophora kuehlmanni Scheer & Pillai, 1983
- Stylophora lobata Gardiner, 1898
- Stylophora madagascarensis Veron, 2000
- Stylophora mamillata Scheer & Pillai, 1983
- †Stylophora minuta Duncan, 1868
- Stylophora pistillata Esper, 1797
- Stylophora subseriata (Ehrenberg, 1834)
- Stylophora wellsi Scheer, 1964
