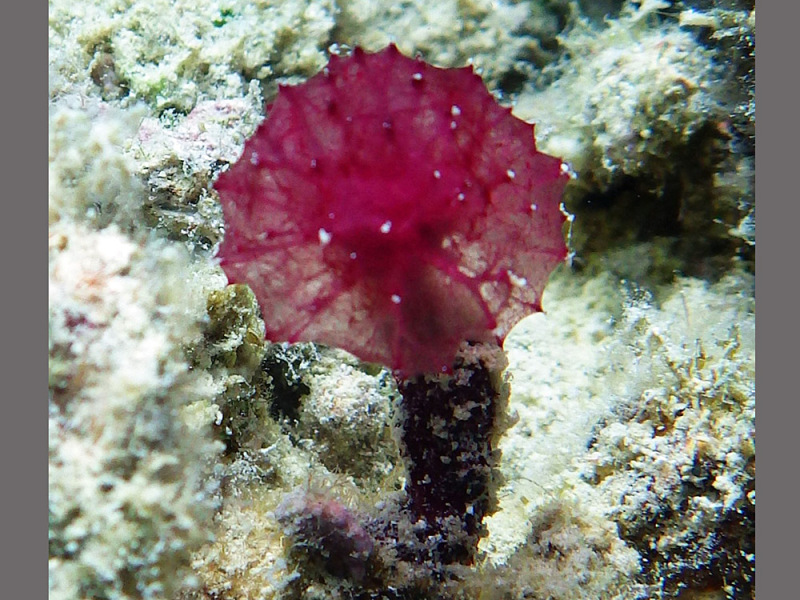

Scientific classification
- Kingdom: Animalia
- Phylum: Porifera
- Class: Demospongiae
- Order: Haplosclerida
- Family: Phloeodictyidae; Carter, 1882

Genera
- See text

Synonyms
- Akaidae Alander, 1942; Oceanapiidae van Soest, 1980

= Phloeodictyidae =

Family of sponges

The Phloeodictyidae are a family of sponges containing the following genera:

- Calyx Vosmaer, 1885
- Oceanapia Norman, 1869
- Pachypellina Burton, 1934
- Siphonodictyon Bergquist, 1965
- Tabulocalyx Pulitzer-Finali, 1993
