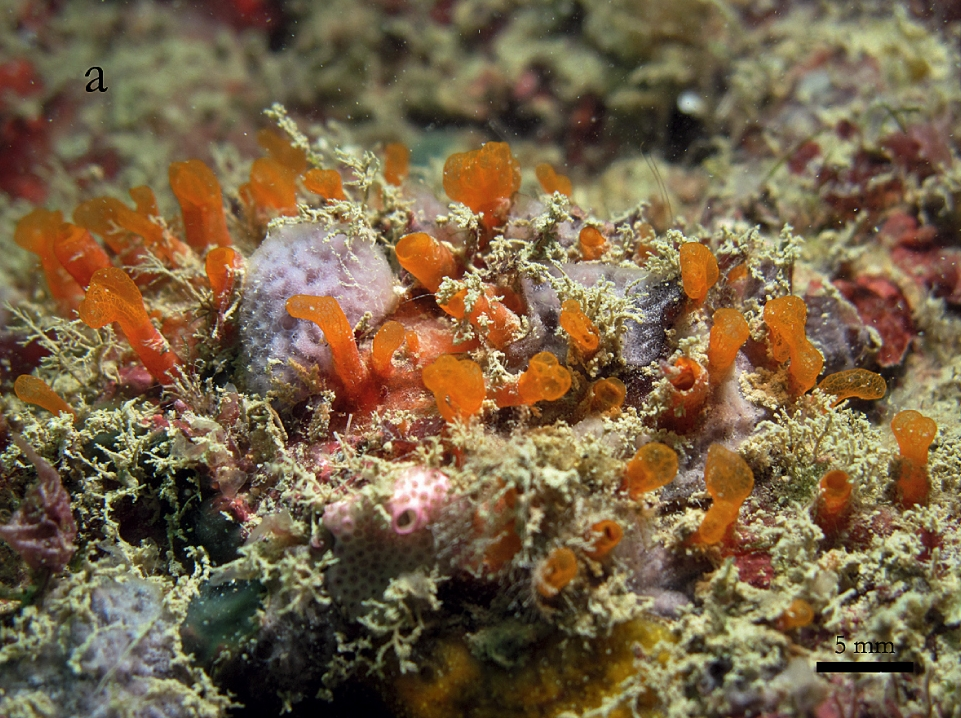
- Forcepia (Forcepia) vansoetsi

Scientific classification
- Kingdom: Animalia
- Phylum: Porifera
- Class: Demospongiae
- Order: Poecilosclerida
- Family: Coelosphaeridae (Dendy, 1992)

Genera
- See text.

= Coelosphaeridae =

Genus of sponges

Coelosphaeridae is a family of sponges belonging to the order Poecilosclerida. Species are found across the globe.

== Description ==
Originally it was believed that this family was restricted to hollow, bladder-like, spherical, club-shaped, tubular, and cushion-shaped growth forms. Other forms, however, were found to have similar spiculation so have since been included, while other genera such as Coelocarteria were removed due to their differing spiculation. This family now contains a diverse array of forms, including fistular (hollow), branching, massive and encrusting sponges. The surface is typically smooth in fistular forms. It is usually irregularly pitted in non-fistular forms, but areolated (colour ringed) pore-fields are absent.

The skeletal architecture is similar to that of the myxillid sponges. Both groups are made of a network of tracts that form an isodictyal skeleton. The usual brushes of tornotes assume a partially tangential position. In the bladder-like fistular forms, the skeleton making up the choanosome (inner part of the sponge) is absent or reduced to a few wispy bundles. In species belonging to the Forcepia (Leptolabis) subgenus, it is hymedesmioid. Like in other families of the order Poecilosclerida, sponges with very similar skeletons and spicules may differ only in the presence or absence of spined acanthostyles (spiny monoaxon spicules that are rounded at one end). These, however have low phylogenetic importance and are typically only used at the subgenus level in the larger genera.

The microscleres include sigmas (curved at both ends) and raphides (thin needles).

== Genera ==
While a total of 39 genera have been suggested to occur in this family, only the following are recognised:

- Celtodoryx (Pérez, Perrin, Carteron, Vacelet & Boury-Esnault, 2006)
- Chaetodoryx (Topsent, 1927)
- Coelosphaera (Thomson, 1873)
- Forcepia (Carter, 1874)
- Histodermella (Lundbeck, 1910)
- Inflatella (Schmidt, 1875)
- Lepidosphaera (Lévi & Lévi, 1979)
- Lissodendoryx (Topsent, 1982)
- Myxillodoryx (Aguilar-Camacho & Carballo, 2012)
