= Émile Topsent =

French zoologist

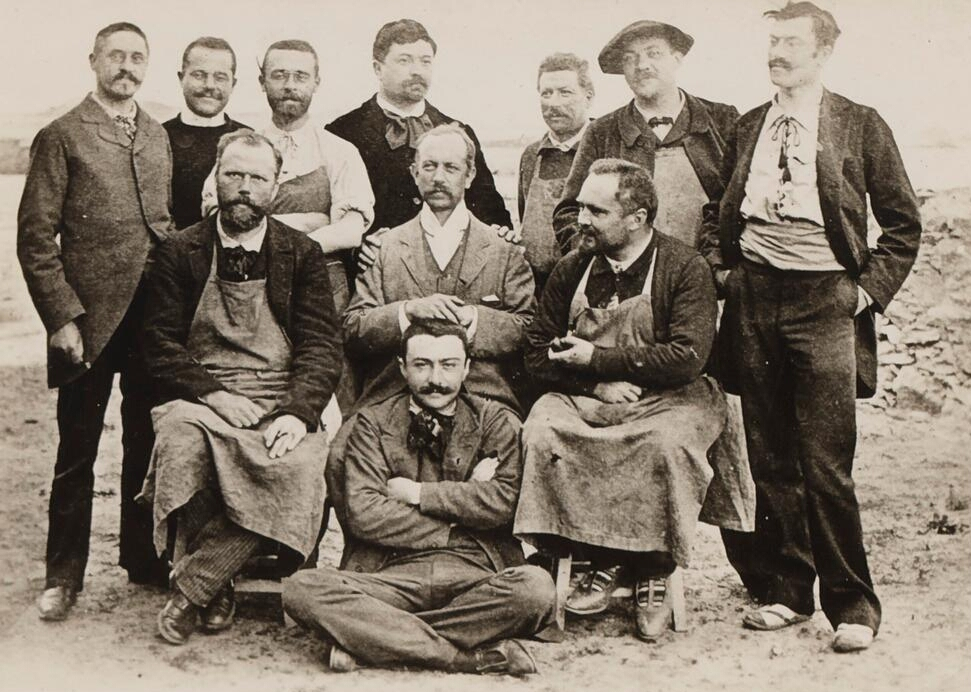
Workers at the Roscoff laboratory, 1896 (Topsent is at the top left)).

Émile-Eugène-Aldric Topsent (10 February 1862 – 22 September 1951) was a French zoologist known for his research of sponges. He was born in Le Havre.

During his career he worked in several laboratories and institutes in western France. From 1919 to 1927 he was curator at the zoological museum in Strasbourg. In 1920 he was appointed chair of the Société zoologique de France.

Topsent described the Atlantic and Mediterranean sponge collections of Prince Albert I of Monaco in three volumes (1892, 1927 & 1928). He named numerous taxa new to science, and his work is considered to be the basis for the modern classification system of Porifera. One of his descriptions involved the hexactinellid sponge Scolymastra joubini, a creature from Antarctic waters that is believed to have a lifespan of 10,000 years.

== Partial listing of publications ==
- Contribution à l'étude des clionides, 1888. (Contribution to the study of Clionaidae).
- Resultats des Campagnes Scientifiques Accomplies sur son Yacht par Albert Ier Prince Souvrain de Monaco, 1892. (Results of the scientific campaign accomplished by Prince Albert I of Monaco).
- Contribution à l'étude des spongiaires de l'Atlantique North, 1892. (Contribution to the study of sponges from the North Atlantic).
- Spongiaires des Açores, 1904. (Sponges of the Azores).
- Expédition Antarctique française 1903-1905, Dr. Jean Charcot commandée par le. Sciences naturelles, documents scientifiques. Spongiaires et coelentérés, 1908. (1903-1905 French Antarctic Expedition, led by Jean-Baptiste Charcot. Natural sciences, scientific documents. Sponges and coelenterata).
- Spongiaires Nationale De L'Expedition Antarctique Ecossaise, 1913. (Sponges from the Scottish National Antarctic Expedition).
- Spongiaires provenant campagnes des scientifiques de la Princesse Alice dans les mers du Nord, 1898-1899, 1906-1907, 1913. (Sponges from scientific cruises of the Princess Alice in the North Sea 1898–1899, 1906–1907).
- Étude de spongiaires du Golfe de Naples, 1925. (Study of sponges from the Gulf of Naples).
- Diagnoses of éponges nouvelles recueillies par le Prince Albert I of Monaco, 1927. (New diagnoses of sponges collected by Prince Albert I of Monaco).
- Spongiaires de l'Atlantique et de la Méditerranée des provenant Croisières du Prince Albert I of Monaco, 1928. (Sponges from the Atlantic and Mediterranean cruises of Prince Albert I of Monaco).
- Aperçu de la faune des Eponges Calcaires de la Méditerranée, 1934. (Overview on the fauna of calcareous sponges from the Mediterranean).
- Guide pour la connaissance d'éponges de la Méditerranée tableaux de corrections apportées aux mémoires d'O. Schmidt sur le sujet 1862, 1864, 1868, 1945. (Guide to the knowledge of sponges from the Mediterranean in regards to the work of Eduard Oscar Schmidt).
